= List of prehistoric mammals =

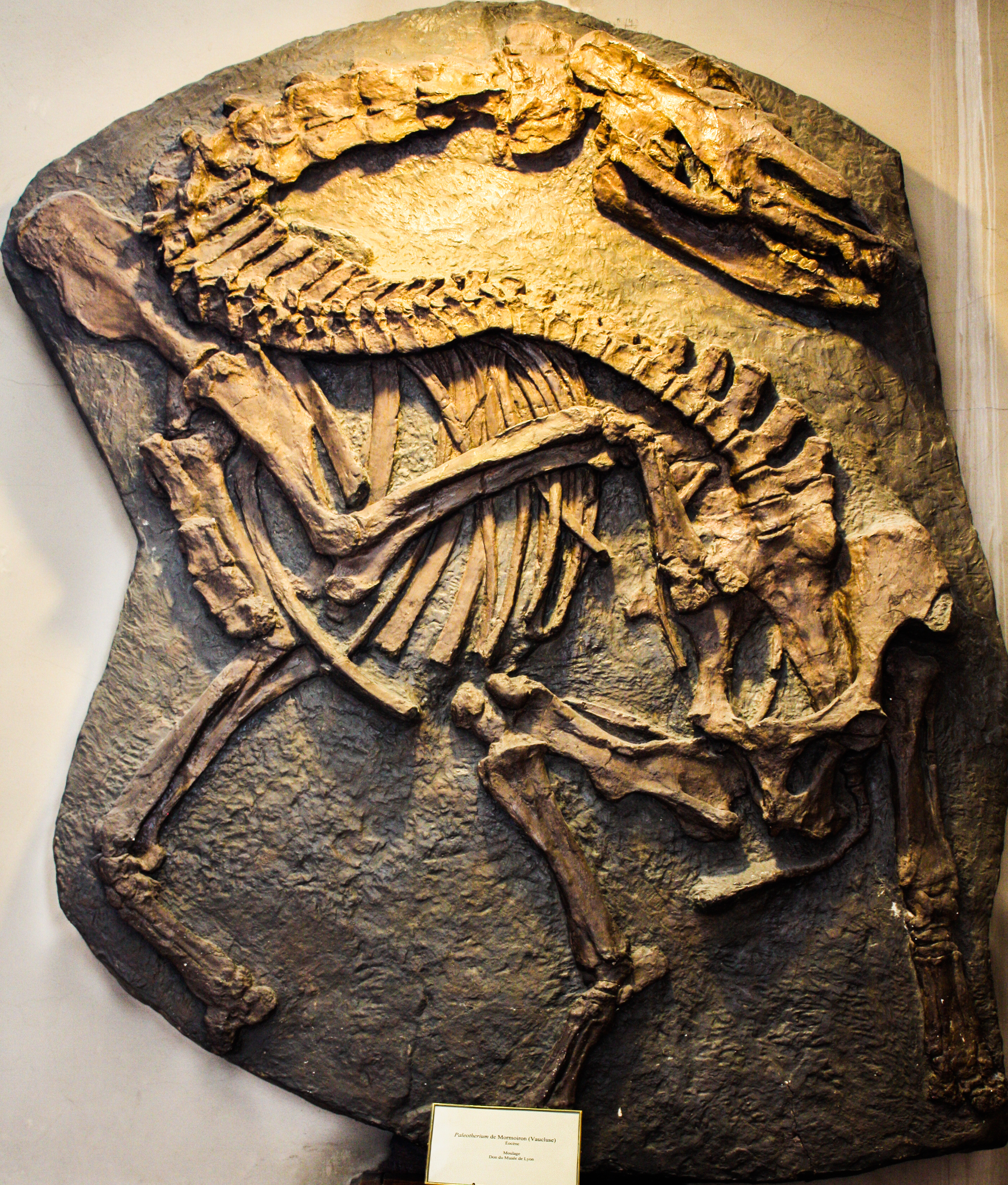
Cast skeleton of Palaeotherium from the National Museum of Natural History, France

This is an incomplete list of prehistoric mammals. It does not include extant mammals or recently extinct mammals. For extinct primate species, see: list of fossil primates.

== Mammaliaformes ==
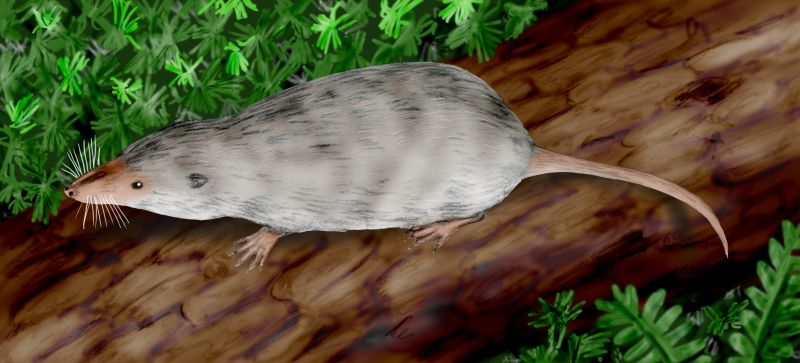
Adelobasileus

- Genus †Adelobasileus Lucas & Hunt 1990
- Genus †Bocaconodon Montellano, Hopson & Clark 2008
- Genus †Delsatia Sigogneau-Russell & Godefroit 1997
- Genus †Tricuspes von Huene 1933
- Genus †Hadrocodium Luo, Crompton & Sun 2001
- Genus †Fruitafossor Luo & Wible 2005

=== Order †Dinnetheria ===
- Family †Dinnetheriidae Averianov & Lopatin 2011
  - Genus †Dinnetherium Jenkins, Crompton & Downs 1983

=== Order †Sinoconodontiformes ===
- Family †Sinoconodontidae Mills 1971
  - Genus †Sinoconodon Patterson & Olson 1961

=== Order †Morganucodonta ===
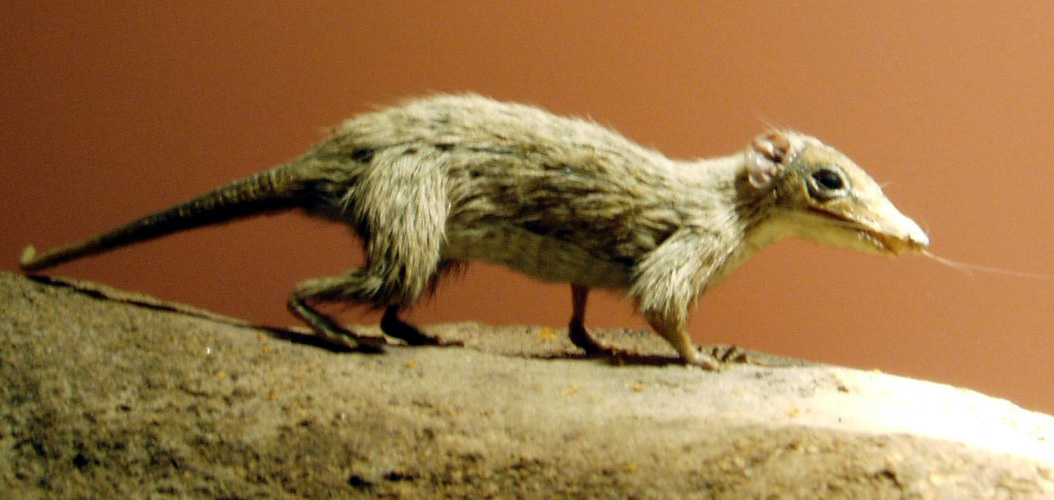
Megazostrodon

- Genus †Bridetherium Clemens 2011
- Genus †Hallautherium Clemens 1980
- Genus †Paceyodon Clemens 2011
- Genus †Purbeckodon Butler et al. 2012
- Genus †Rosierodon Debuysschere, Gherrbrant & Allain 2014
- Family †Megazostrodontidae Cow 1986 sensu Kielan-Jaworowska, Cifelli & Luo 2004
  - Genus †Wareolestes Freeman 1979
  - Genus †Brachyzostrodon Sigogneau-Russell 1983a
  - Genus †Megazostrodon Crompton & Jenkins 1968
- Family †Morganucodontidae Kühne 1958
  - Genus †Gondwanadon Datta & Das 1996
  - Genus †Holwellconodon Lucas & Hunt 1990
  - Genus †Indotherium Yadagiri 1984 non Kretzoi 1942
  - Genus †Indozostrodon Datta & Das 2001
  - Genus †Helvetiodon Clemens 1980
  - Genus †Erythrotherium Crompton 1964
  - Genus †Eozostrodon Parrington 1941
  - Genus †Morganucodon Kühne 1949

=== Order †Docodonta ===
Middle to Late Jurassic

- Family †Docodontidae
  - Genus †Agilodocodon Meng et al. 2015
  - Genus †Docofossor Luo et al. 2015
  - Genus †Gondtherium Prasad & Manhas 2007
  - Genus †Cyrtlatherium Freeman 1979 sensu Sigogneau-Russell 2001
  - Genus †Haldanodon Kühne & Krusat 1972 sensu Sigoneau-Russell 2003
  - Genus †Borealestes Waldman & Savage 1972
  - Genus †Dsugarodon Pfretzschner et al. 2005 [Acuodulodon Hu, Meng & Clark 2007]
  - Genus †Castorocauda Ji et al. 2006
  - Genus †Simpsonodon Kermack et al. 1987
  - Genus †Krusatodon Sigogneau-Russell 2003
  - Genus †Hutegotherium Averianov et al. 2010
  - Genus †Tashkumyrodon Martin & Averianov 2004
  - Genus †Tegotherium Tatarinov 1994
  - Genus †Sibirotherium Maschenko, Lopatin & Voronkevich 2002
  - Genus †Reigitherium Bonaparte 1990
  - Genus †Peraiocynodon Simpson 1928
  - Genus †Docodon Marsh 1881 [Dicrocynodon Marsh 1880; Diplocynodon Marsh 1880 non Pomel 1847; Ennacodon Marsh 1890; Enneodon Marsh 1887 non Prangner 1845; Dryolestes Marsh 1879]

=== Order †Kuehneotheria ===
- Family †Woustersiidae Sigogneau-Russell & Hahn 1995
  - Genus †Woutersia Sigogneau-Russell 1983b
- Family †Kuehneotheriidae Kermack, Kermack & Musset 1968
  - Genus †Kuehneotherium Kermack, Kermack & Musset 1968
  - Genus †Kuehneon Kretzoi 1960 (nomen vanum)

=== Order †Eutriconodonta ===
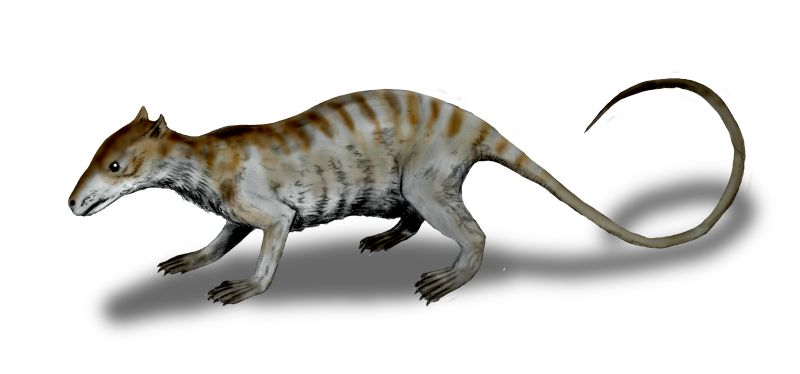
Jeholodens

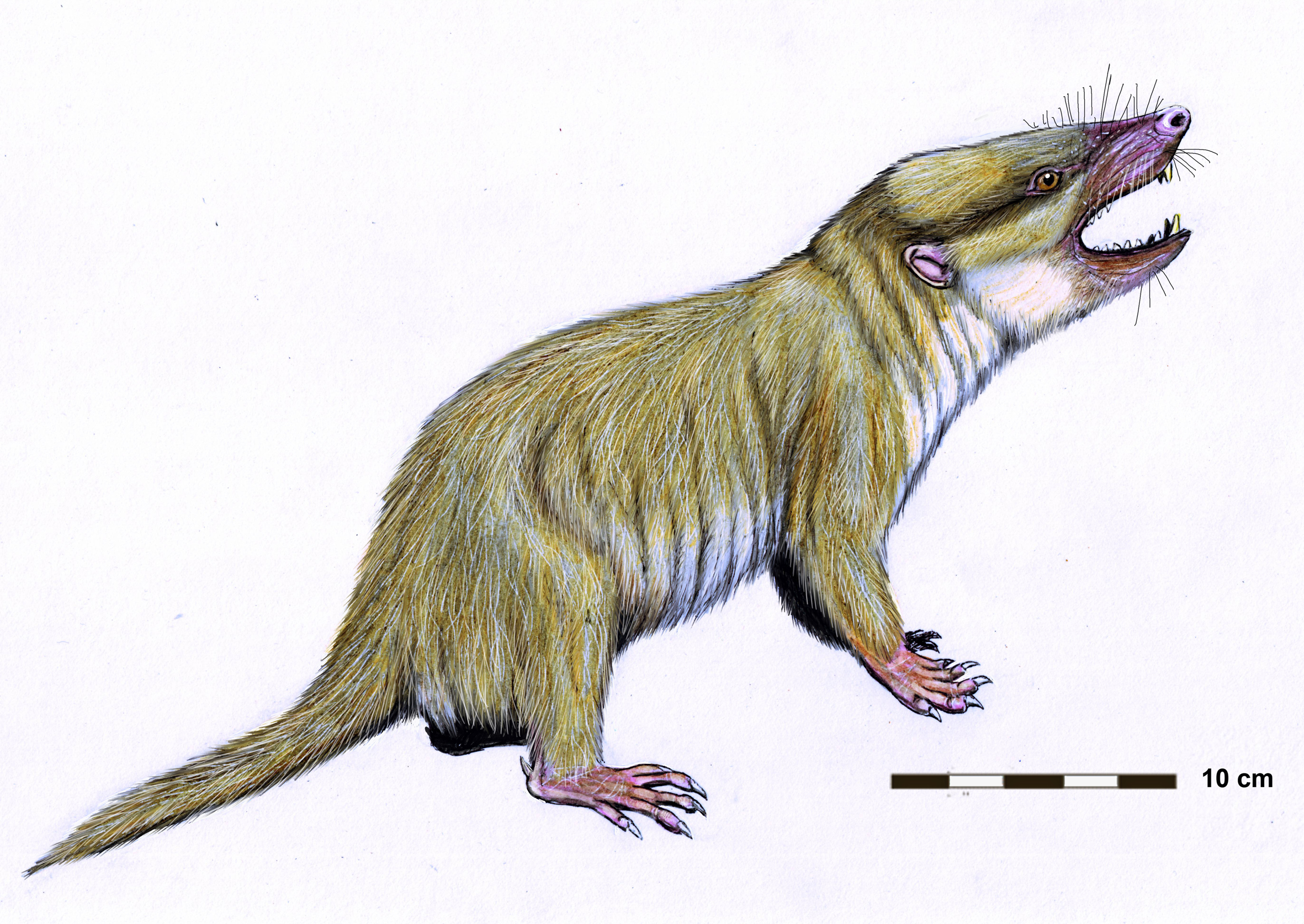
Gobiconodon

Early Jurassic–Late Cretaceous

- Genus ?†Dyskritodon Sigogneau-Russell 1995
- Family †Amphidontidae Simpson 1925
  - Genus †Acinacodus Lopatin, Maschenko & Averianov 2010
  - Genus †Amphidon Simpson 1925
  - Genus †Gobiotheriodon Trofimov 1997 [Gobiodon Trofimov 1980 non Bleeker 1856]
  - Genus †Manchurodon Yabe & Shikama 1938
  - Genus †Nakunodon Yadagiri 1985
  - Genus †Aploconodon Simpson 1925
  - Genus †Comodon Kretzoi & Kretzoi 2000 non Stein 1859 [Phascolodon Simpson 1925; Phascolotheridium Cifelli & Dykes 2001]
  - Genus †Hakusanodon Rougier, Isaji & Manabe 2007
  - Genus †Juchilestes Gao, Wilson, Luo, Maga, Meng & Wang 2009
- Family †Amphilestidae Osborn 1888 sensu Luo, Kielan-Jaworowska & Cifelli 2002 [Phascolotheriidae Osborn 1887]
  - Genus †Condorodon Gaetano & Rougier 2012
  - Genus †Kemchugia magna
  - Genus †Kryptotherium Sigogneau-Russell 2003
  - Genus †Liaotherium Zhou, Cheng & Wang 1991
  - Genus †Paikasigudodon Prasad & Manhas 2002 [Kotatherium yadagirii Prasad & Manhas 1997]
  - Genus †Amphilestes Owen 1871 [Amphitherium Owen 1845 non von Meyer non de Blainville 1838]
  - Genus †Phascolotherium Owen 1838 [Didelphys Broderip 1828; Thylacotherium Valenciennes 1838]
  - Genus †Tendagurodon Heinrich 1998
- Family Jeholodentidae Luo et al. 2007
  - Genus †Jeholodens Luo, Chen, Li & Chen 2007
  - Genus †Yanoconodon Ji, Luo & Ji 1999
- Family †Klameliidae Martin & Averianov 2007
  - Genus †Ferganodon Thomas & Averianov 2006
  - Genus †Klamelia Chow & Rich 1984
- Family †Gobiconodontidae Chow & Rich 1984 sensu Luo, Kielan-Jaworowska & Cifelli 2002
  - Genus †Huasteconodon Montellano, Hopson & Clark 2008
  - Genus †Meemannodon Meng et al. 2005
  - Genus †Spinolestes Martin et al. 2015
  - Genus †Hangjinia Godefroit & Guo 1999
  - Genus †Gobiconodon Trofimov 1978 sensu Kielen-Jaworowsky & Dashzeveg 1998 [Guchinodon Trofimov 1978; Guchinodon Trofomiv 1974 nomen nudum]
  - Genus †Repenomamus Li et al. 2001
- Clade †Volaticotheria Meng et al. 2006 emend. Meng et al. 2007
  - Genus †Volaticotherium Meng et al. 2006 emend. Meng et al. 2007
  - Genus †Ichthyoconodon Sigogneau-Russell 1995
  - Genus †Argentoconodon Rougier et al. 2007
  - Genus †Jugulator Cifelli & Madsen 1998
  - Genus †Triconolestes Engelmann & Callison 1998
- Family †Triconodontidae Marsh 1887
  - Genus †Victoriaconodon Montellano et al. 2008
  - Genus †Priacodon Marsh 1887 [Tinodon]
  - Subfamily †Triconodontinae Marsh 1887 non Hay 1902
    - Genus †Triconodon Owen 1859 [Triacanthodon Owen 1871]
    - Genus †Trioracodon Simpson 1928 non Owen 1871
  - Subfamily †Alticonodontinae Fox 1976
    - Genus †Meiconodon Kusuhashi et al. 2009
    - Genus †Arundelconodon Cifelli et al. 1999
    - Genus †Astroconodon Patterson 1951
    - Genus †Alticonodon Fox 1969
    - Genus †Corviconodon Cifelli, Wible & Jenkins 1998

=== Symmetrodonta incertae sedis ===
- Genus †Atlasodon Sigogneau-Russell 1991
- Genus †Kennetheredium Sigogneau-Russell 2003a
- Genus †Kotatherium Datta 1981
- Genus †Trishulotherium Yadagiri 1985

=== Basal Cladotheria ===
- Genus †Afriquiamus Sigogneau-Russell 1999
- Genus †Butlerigale Kühne 1968 [?Dryolestes leiriensis]
- Genus †Chunnelodon Ensom & Sigogneau-Russell 1998
- Genus †Guimarota Kuhne 1968

=== Basal Zatheria ===
- Genus †Minimus Sigogneau-Russell 1999
- Genus †Magnimus Sigogneau-Russell 1999
- Genus †Nanolestes Martin 2002
- Family †Arguimuridae Dashzeveg 1994 [Arguitheriidae Dashzeveg 1994]
  - Genus †Arguimus 1979 [Arguitherium Dashzeveg 1994]
- Family †Mozomuridae Li et al. 2005
  - Genus †Mozomus Li et al. 2005

== Subclass Yinotheria ==
=== Order †Shuotherida ===
- Family †Shuotheriidae Chow & Rich 1982
  - Genus †Itatodon Lopatin & Averianov 2005
  - Genus †Shuotherium Chow & Rich 1982
  - Genus †Paritatodon Martin & Averianov 2010
  - Genus †Pseudotribos Luo, Ji & Yuan 2007

=== Order †Ausktribosphenida ===
- Family †Ausktribosphenidae Rich et al. 1997
  - Genus †Bishops Rich et al. 2001
  - Genus †Ausktribosphenos Rich et al. 1997

=== Order †Henosferida ===
- Family †Henosferidae Rougier et al. 2007
  - Genus †Henosferus Rougier et al. 2007
  - Genus †Asfaltomylos Rauhut et al. 2002
  - Genus †Ambondro Flynn et al. 1999

=== Order Monotremata ===
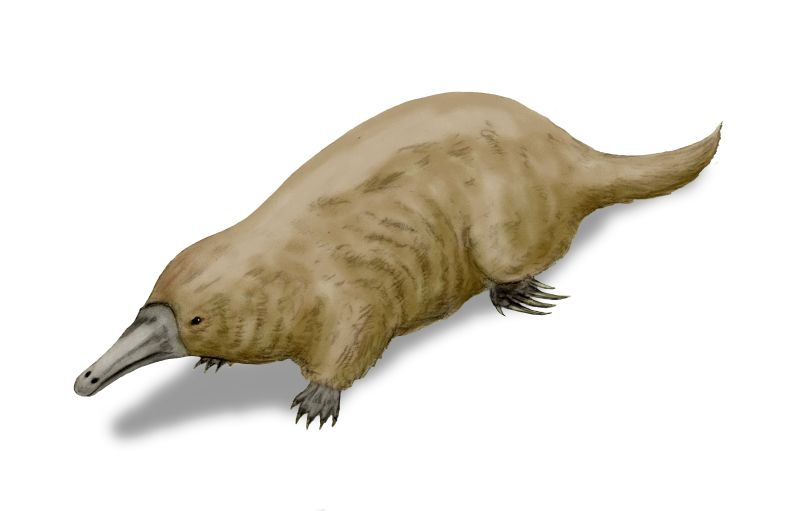
Steropodon

Middle Cretaceous–Recent

- Genus †Teinolophos Rich et al. 1999
- Genus †Kryoryctes Pridmore et al. 2005
- Family †Kollikodontidae Flannery et al. 1995
  - Genus †Kollikodon Flannery et al. 1995
- Family Ornithorhynchidae Gray 1825 [Steropodontidae Archer et al. 1985] (Platypuses)
  - Genus †Monotrematum Pascual et al. 1992
  - Genus †Steropodon Archer et al. 1985
  - Genus †Obdurodon Woodburne & Tedford 1975
- Family Tachyglossidae Gill 1872 [Echidnidae Burnett 1830] (echidnas, spiny anteaters)
  - Genus Zaglossus Gill 1877 [Proechidna Gervais 1877; Acanthoglossus Gervais 1877; Bruynia Dubois 1882; Bruijia Thomas 1883; Prozaglossus Kerbert 1913; Megalibgwilia Griffiths, Wells & Barrie 1991] (Extant genus with extinct species)

== Subclass Allotheria ==
=== Order †Haramiyida ===
- Genus †Kirtlingtonia Butler & Hooker 2005 [tooth-taxa]
- Genus †Millsodon Butler & Hooker 2005 [tooth-taxa]
- Family †Haramiyaviidae Butler 2000
  - Genus †Haramiyavia Jenkins et al. 1997
- Family †Eleutherodontidae Kermack et al. 1998 [Arboroharamiyidae Zheng et al. 2013; Euharamiyida Bi et al. 2014; Eleutherodontida Kermack et al. 1998]
  - Genus †Megaconus Zhou et al. 2013
  - Genus †Shenshou Bi et al. 2014
  - Genus †Arboroharamiya Zheng et al. 2013
  - Genus †Xianshou Bi et al. 2014
  - Genus †Sineleutherus Martin, Averianov & Pfretzschner 2010
- Family †Theroteinidae Sigogneau-Russell, Frank & Hammerle 1986
  - Genus †Theroteinus Sigogneau-Russell, Frank & Hammerle 1986
- Family †Thomasiidae Poche 1908 [Haramiyidae Simpson 1947 sensu Jenkins et al. 1997; Microlestidae Murry 1866; Microcleptidae Simpson 1928]
  - Genus †Eoraetia
  - Genus †Avashishta Anantharaman & al. 2006
  - Genus †Allostaffia Heinrich 2004 [Staffia Heinrich 1999 non Schubert 1911]
  - Genus †Thomasia Poche 1908 [Haramiya Simpson 1947; Hypnoprymnopsis Dawkins 1864; Microlestes Plieninger 1847 non Schmidt Goebel 1846; Microcleptes Simpson 1928 non Newman 1840; Plieningeria Krausse 1919; Stathmodon Henning 1911]

=== Order †Multituberculata ===
Late Jurassic–Eocene

- Genus †Argillomys Cifelli, Gordon & Lipka 2013
- Genus †Janumys erebos Eaton & Cifelli 2001
- Genus †Xyronomys Rigby 1980
- Family †Plagiaulacidae Gill 1872 sensu Kielan-Jaworowska & Hurum 2001 [Bolodontidae Osborn 1887]
- Family †Hahnotheriidae Butler & Hooker 2005
- Family †Kermackodontidae Butler & Hooker 2005
- Family †Albionbaataridae Kielan-Jaworowska & Ensom 1994
- Family †Eobaataridae Kielan-Jaworowska, Dashzeveg & Trofimov 1987
- Superfamily †Allodontoidea Marsh 1889
  - Genus †Glirodon Engelmann & Callison 2001
  - Family †Arginbaataridae Hahn & Hahn 1983 non Trofimov 1980
  - Family †Zofiabaataridae Bakker 1992
  - Family †Allodontidae Marsh 1889
- Superfamily †Paulchoffatioidea Hahn 1969 sensu Hahn & Hahn 2003
  - Genus †Mojo Hahn, LePage & Wouters 1987
  - Genus †Rugosodon Yuan et al. 2013
  - Family †Hahnodontidae Sigigneau-Russell 1991
  - Family †Pinheirodontidae Hahn & Hahn 1999
  - Family †Paulchoffatiidae Hahn 1969 sensu McKenna & Bell 1997
- Suborder †Gondwanatheria
  - Family †Ferugliotheriidae Bonaparte 1986
  - Family †Sudamericidae Scillato-Yané & Pascual 1984 [Gondwanatheridae Bonaparte 1986]
  - Family †Groeberiidae Patterson 1952 sensu Flynn & Wyss 1999
- Suborder †Cimolodonta
  - Genus †Ameribaatar Eaton & Cifelli 2001
  - Genus †Argentodites Kielan-Jaworowska et al. 2007
  - Genus †Bryceomys Eaton 1995
  - Genus †Bubodens Wilson 1987
  - Genus †Cedaromys Eaton & Cifelli 2001
  - Genus †Clemensodon Krause 1992 [Kimbetohia cambi, in partim]
  - Genus †Dakotamys Eaton 1995
  - Genus †Fractinus Higgins 2003
  - Genus †Halodon Marsh 1889
  - Genus †Uzbekbaatar Kielan-Jaworowska & Nesov 1992
  - Genus †Viridomys Fox 1971
  - Genus †Paracimexomys Archibald 1982 [Barbatodon Rãdulescu & Samson 1987]
  - Genus †Cimexomys Sloan & Van Valen 1965 sensu stricto?
  - Family †Corriebaataridae Rich et al. 2009
  - Family †Boffiidae Hahn & Hahn 1983 sensu Kielan-Jaworowska & Hurum 2001
  - Family †Cimolomyidae Marsh 1889 sensu Kielan-Jaworowska & Hurum 2001
  - Family †Kogaionidae Rãdulescu & Simpson 1996
  - Family †Eucosmodontidae Jepsen 1940
  - Family †Microcosmodontidae Holtzman & Wolberg 1977
  - Superfamily †Ptilodontoidea Cope 1887 sensu McKenna & Bell 1997 & Kielan-Jaworowska & Hurum 2001
    - Genus †Neoliotomus Jepsen 1930
    - Family †Cimolodontidae Marsh 1889 sensu Kielan-Jaworowska & Hurum 2001
    - Family †Ptilodontidae Cope 1887 sensu McKenna & Bell 1997
  - Superfamily †Taeniolabidoidea Granger & Simpson 1929 sensu Kielan-Jaworowska & Hurum 2001
    - Family †Taeniolabididae Granger & Simpson 1929
  - Superfamily †Djadochtatheroidea Kielan-Jaworowska & Hurum 1997 sensu Kielan-Jaworowska & Hurum 2001 Djadochtatheria Kielan-Jaworowska & Hurum 1997]
    - Genus †Bulganbaatar Kielan-Jaworowska 1974
    - Genus †Nemegtbaatar Kielan-Jaworowska 1974
    - Genus †Pentacosmodon Jepsen 1940
    - Family †Chulsanbaataridae Kielan-Jaworowska 1974
    - Family †Sloanbaataridae Kielan-Jaworowska 1974
    - Family †Djadochtatheriidae Kielan-Jaworowska & Hurum 1997

== Subclass Theria ==
=== Basal Theria ===
- Genus †Aethomylos Novacek 1976
- Genus †Anisorhizus Ameghino 1902 (notoungulate)
- Genus †Falepterus Clemens & Lillegraven 1986
- Genus †Paleomolops Cifelli 1994
- Genus †Tetraprothomo Ameghino 1902 non Ameghino 1884
- Genus †Tribotherium Sigogneau-Russell 1991
- Genus †Zygiocuspis Cifelli 1990
- Family †Endotheriidae Shikama 1947
  - Genus †Endotherium Shikama 1947
- Family †Kermackiidae Butler 1978
  - Genus †Kermackia Slaughter 1971 [Trinictitherium Butler 1978]
- Family †Plicatodontidae Ameghino 1904
  - Genus †Plicatodon Ameghino 1904
- Family †Potamotelsidae Nesov 1987
  - Genus †Potamotelses Fox 1972 non Nesov 1987
- Family †Russellmyidae Estravis 1990
  - Genus †Russellmys Estravis 1990

=== Infraclass †Pantotheria ===
- Genus †Tribactonodon Sigogneau-Russell, Hooker & Ensom 2001
- Genus †Paraungulatum Bonaparte 1999
- Genus †Argaliatherium Cifelli & Davis 2015
- Genus †Carinalestes Cifelli & Davis 2015
- Genus †Hypomylos Sigogneau-Russell 1992
- Family †Casamiqueliidae Bonaparte 1999
  - Genus †Casamiquelia Bonaparte 1990 [after Averianov 2002]
  - Genus †Rougiertherium Bonaparte 1999
  - Genus †Alamitherium Bonaparte 1999
- Family †Brandoniidae Bonaparte 1992
  - Genus †Brandonia Bonaparte 1992
- Family †Donodontidae Sigogneau-Russell 1991
  - Genus †Donodon Sigogneau-Russell 1991
- Family †Paurodontidae Marsh 1887 non Thorne 1941
  - Genus †Araeodon Simpson 1937
  - Genus †Archaeotrigon Simpson 1927
  - Genus †Brancatherulum Dietrich 1927
  - Genus †Comotherium Prothero 1981
  - Genus †Dorsetodon Ensom & Sigogneau-Russell 1998
  - Genus †Drescheratherium Krebs 1998
  - Genus †Euthlastus Simpson 1927
  - Genus †Foxraptor Bakker & Carpenter 1990
  - Genus †Henkelotherium Krebs 1991
  - Genus †Paurodon Marsh 1887
  - Genus †Tathiodon (Simpson 1927) Simpson 1927 [Tanaodon Simpson1927 non Kirk 1927; Pelicopsis Simpson 1927]
- Family †Vincelestidae Bonaparte 1986
  - Genus †Vincelestes Bonaparte 1986
- Family †Picopsidae Fox 1980
  - Genus †Picopsis Fox 1980
  - Genus †Tirotherium Montellano-Ballesteros & Fox 2015

==== Order †Spalacotheriida ====
- Genus †Gobiotheriodon Trofimov 1997 sensu Averianov 2002 [Gobiodon Trofimov 1980 non Bleeker 1856]
- Genus †Maotherium Rougier, Ji & Novacek 2003
- Family †Thereuodontidae Sigogneau-Russell 1998
  - Genus †Thereuodon Sigogneau-Russell 1987
- Family †Zhangheotheriidae Rougier, Ji & Novacek 2003
  - Genus †Zhangheotherium Hu et al. 1997
- Family †Tinodontidae Fox 1985
  - Subfamily †Bondesiinae Bonaparte 1990
    - Genus †Bondesius Bonaparte 1990 [?archaeonycterid microbat; dryolestid milk teeth (Averianov 2002)]
  - Subfamily †Tinodontinae
    - Genus †Mictodon Fox 1984
    - Genus †Yermakia Lopatin et al. 2005 [?Ungulatomorpha]
    - Genus †Tinodon Marsh 1879 [Menacodon Marsh 1887; Eurylambda Simpson 1929a]
- Family †Barbereniidae Bonaparte 1990
  - Genus †Quirogatherium Bonaparte 1990 [? dryolestid milk teeth (Averianov 2002)]
  - Genus †Barberenia Bonaparte 1990 [? dryolestid milk teeth (Averianov 2002)]
- Family †Spalacotheriidae Marsh 1887 [Peratheridae Osborn 1887]
  - Genus †Infernolestes Cifelli, Davis & Sames 2014
  - Genus †Microderson Sigogneau-Russell 1991 [? stem-group zatherian (Averianov 2002)]
  - Genus †Shalbaatar Nesov 1997
  - Genus †Yaverlestes Sweetman 2008
  - Subfamily †Spalacotheriinae Marsh 1887
    - Genus †Spalacotherium Owen 1854 [Peralestes Owen 1871]
  - Subfamily †Spalacolestinae Cifelli & Madsen 1999
    - Genus †Aliaga Cuenca-Bescós et al. 2014
    - Genus †Symmetrolestes Tsubamoto et al. 2004
    - Genus †Akidolestes Li & Luo 2006
    - Genus †Heishanlestes Hu, Fox, Wang & Li 2005
    - Genus †Spalacotheroides Patterson 1955
    - Genus †Spalacotheridium Cifelli 1990c
    - Genus †Spalacolestes Cifelli 1999
    - Genus †Symmetrodontoides Fox 1979 [?Dryolestidans Bonaparte 1999]

==== Order †Meridiolestida ====
- Genus †Leonardus Bonaparte 1990
- Genus †Cronopio Rougier, Apesteguia & Gaetano 2011
- Family †Necrolestidae Ameghino 1894
  - Genus †Necrolestes Ameghino 1894 sensu Rougier et al. 2012
- Superfamily †Mesungulatoidea
  - Family †Reigitheriidae Bonaparte 1990
    - Genus †Reigitherium Bonaparte 1990
  - Family †Peligotheriidae Bonaparte, Van Valen & Kramartz 1993
    - Genus †Peligrotherium Bonaparte, Van Valen & Kramartz 1993
  - Family †Mesungulatidae Bonaparte 1986 sensu Rougier et al. 2009
    - Genus †Coloniatherium Rougier et al. 2009
    - Genus †Mesungulatum Bonaparte & Soria 1985
- Family †Austrotriconodontidae Bonaparte 1992
  - Genus †Austrotriconodon Bonaparte 1986b

==== Order †Dryolestida ====
- Family †Dryolestidae Marsh 1879
  - Genus †Anthracolestes Averianov, Martin & Lopatin 2014
  - Genus †Guimarotodus Martin 1999
  - Genus †Krebsotherium Martin 1999
  - Genus †Phascolestes Owen 1871
  - Genus †Lakotalestes Cifelli, Davis & Sames 2014
  - Genus †Laolestes Simpson 1927
  - Genus †Melanodon Simpson 1927 [Malthacolestes Simpson 1927]
  - Genus †Amblotherium Owen 1871 [Stylodon Owen 1866 non Beck 1837; Achyrodon Owen 1871; Odontostylus Trouessant 1898; Trouessartia Cossman 1899 non Canestrini & Kramer 1899; Trouessartiella Cossman 1899; Stylacodon Marsh 1879; Laodon Marsh 1887; Kepolestes Simpson 1927]
  - Genus †Dryolestes Marsh 1878 [Asthenodon Marsh 1887; Herpetairus Simpson 1927; Laolestes Simpson 1927]
  - Genus †Portopinheirodon Martin 1999
  - Genus †Peraspalax Owen 1871 [Amblotherium Lydekker 1887]
  - Genus †Kurtodon Osborn 1887 [Athrodon Osborn 1887 non Sauvage 1880; Odontocyrtus Trouessart 1905]
  - Genus †Crusafontia Henkel & Krebs 1969
  - Genus †Groeberitherium Bonaparte 1986

==== Order †Amphitheriida ====
- Family †Amphitheriidae Owen 1846
  - Genus †Amphibetulimus Lopatin & Averianov 2007
  - Genus †Amphitherium de Blainville 1838 non Owen 1845 non von Meyer [Amphigonus Agassiz 1838; Amphitylus Osborn 1888; Botheratiotherium de Blainville 1838; Heterotherium de Blainville 1838 non Fischer de Waldheim 1822; Thylacotherium Valenciennes 1838]

==== Order †Peramurida ====
- Family †Peramuridae Kretzoi 1946
  - Genus †Kiyatherium Maschenko, Lopatin & Voronkevich 2002
  - Genus †Tendagurutherium Heinrich 1998
  - Genus †Peramuroides Davis 2012
  - Genus †Kuriogenys Davis 2012
  - Genus †Peramus Owen 1871 [Leptocladus Owen 1871]
  - Genus †Palaeoxonodon Freeman 1976
  - Genus †Abelodon Brunet et al. 1991
  - Genus †Pocamus Canudo & Cuenca-Bescós 1996

==== Order †Aegialodontia ====
- Family †Aegialodontidae Kermack 1967
  - Genus †Aegialodon Kermack, Lees & Mussett 1965
  - Genus †Kielantherium Dashzeveg 1975

==== Order †Pappotherida ====
- Family †Pappotheriidae Slaughter 1965
  - Genus †Paraisurus (Shark Species) non Glikman 1957
  - Genus †Pappotherium Slaughter 1965
  - Genus †Slaughteria (Junior Synonym of Pappotherium) Butler 1978

=== Infraclass Metatheria ===
Late Cretaceous–Recent

==== Metatheria incertae sedis ====
- Genus †Sinodelphys Luo et al. 2003
- Genus †Anchistodelphys Cifelli 1990
- Genus †Arcantiodelphys Vullo, Gherbrant Muizon & Neraudeau 2009
- Genus †Dakotadens Eaton 1993
- Genus †Camptomus Marsh 1889
- Genus †Iqualadelphis Fox 1987
- Family †Adinodontidae Hershkovitz 1995
  - Genus †Adinodon Hershkovitz 1995
- Genus †Varalphadon Johanson 1996
- Genus †Bistius Clemens & Lillegraven 1986
- Genus †Turgidodon Cifelli 1990
- Genus †Swaindelphys Johanson 1996
- Genus †Esteslestes Novacek et al. 1991
- Genus †Copedelphys Korth 1994
- Genus †Itaboraidelphys Marshall & de Muizon 1984
- Genus †Marmosopsis Couto 1962
- Genus †Mizquedelphys Marshall & de Muizon 1988
- Genus †Otolicnus Illiger 1811
- Genus †Pauladelphys Goin et al. 1999
- Genus †Pucadelphys Marshall & de Muizon 1988
- Genus †Andinodelphys Marshall & de Muizon 1988
- Genus †Szalinia de Muizon & Cifelli 2001
- Genus †Djarthia Godthelp, Wroe & Archer 1999
- Family †Jaskhadelphysidae Marshall & de Muizon 1988
  - Genus †Jaskhadelphys Marshall & de Muizon 1988
- Family †Herpetotheriidae Trouessant 1879
  - Genus †Herpetotherium Cope 1873
  - Genus †Amphiperatherium Filhol 1879 [Oxygomphius von Meyer 1846 nomen oblitum; Microtarsioides Weigelt 1933; Ceciliolemur Weigelt 1933; Ceciliolemuridae Weigelt 1933]
  - Genus †Asiadidelphis Gabunia, Shevyreva & Gabunia 1990
  - Genus †Garadelphys [Garatherium Crochet 1984]
  - Genus †Golerdelphys Williamson & Lofgren 2014
  - Genus †Entomacodon Marsh 1872 [Centracodon Marsh 1872]
  - Genus †Maastrichtidelphys Martin et al. 2005
  - Genus †Nortedelphys Case, Goin & Woodburne 2005
  - Genus †Rumiodon Goin & Candela 2004
- Family †Hondadelphidae Marshall, Case & Woodburne 1990
  - Genus †Hondadelphys Marshall 1976

==== Basal Metatheria ====
- Genus †Aenigmadelphys Cifelli & Johanson 1994
- Genus †Archaeonothos Beck 2015
- Genus †Duquettichnus Sarjeant & Thulborn 1986 {Marsupialipida} [trace fossils]
- Genus †Ghamidtherium Sánches-Villagra et al. 2007
- Genus †Kasserinotherium Crochet 1989
- Genus †Palangania Goin et al. 1998
- Genus †Perrodelphys Goin et al. 1999
- Family †Numbigilgidae Beck et al. 2008
  - Genus †Numbigilga Beck et al. 2008

==== Ameridelphia incertae sedis ====
- Genus †Adelodelphys Cifelli 2004
- Genus †Apistodon Davis 2007
- Genus †Cocatherium Goin et al. 2006
- Genus †Iugomortiferum Cifelli 1990b
- Genus †Marambiotherium Goin et al. 1999
- Genus †Pascualdelphys fierroensis
- Genus †Progarzonia Ameghino 1904
- Genus †Protalphadon Cifelli 1990
- Genus †Sinbadelphys Cifelli 2004

==== Order †Protodelphia ====
- Family †Holoclemensiidae Alpin & Archer 1987
  - Genus †Holoclemensia Slaughter 1968 [Clemensia Slaughter 1968 non Packard 1864; Comanchea Jacobs, Winkler & Murry 1989]

==== Order †Deltatheroida ====
- Genus †Atokatheridium Kielan-Jaworowska & Cifelli 2001
- Genus †Khuduklestes Nesov, Sigogneau-Russell & Russell 1994
- Family †Deltatheridiidae Gregory & Simpson 1926 [Nanocuridae Fox, Scott & Bryant 2007; Sulestinae Nessov 1985]
  - Genus †Hydotherium Gregory & Simpson 1926
  - Genus †Lotheridium Bi et al. 2015
  - Genus †Nanocuris Fox, Scott & Bryant 2007
  - Genus †Prodeltitheridium Trofimov 1984
  - Genus †Oklatheridium Davis, Cifelli & Kielan-Jaworowska 2008
  - Genus †Oxlestes Nesov 1982
  - Genus †Deltatheridium Gregory & Simpson 1926
  - Genus †Sulestes Nesov 1985 [Deltatherus Nesov 1997; Marsasia Nesov 1997]
  - Genus †Tsagandelta Rougier, Davis & Novacek 2015
  - Genus †Deltatheroides Gregory & Simpson 1926

==== Order †Asiadelphia ====
- Family †Asiatheriidae Trofimov & Szalay 1994 [Asiadelphidae Trofimov & Szalay 1994]
  - Genus †Kokopellia Cifelli 1993
  - Genus †Asiatherium Trofimov & Szalay 1994 [Asiatherium Trofimov & Cuny 1993 (nomen nudum)]

==== Order †Alphadontia ====
- Family †Alphadontidae Marshall, Case & Woodburne 1990
  - Genus †Eoalphadon Eaton 2009
  - Genus †Albertatherium Fox 1971
  - Genus †Alphadon Simpson 1927
- Family †Pediomyidae Simpson 1927 [Aquiladelphidae Davis 2007]
  - Genus †Monodelphopsis de Paula Couto 1952 [? microbiotheriid (Marshall et al. 1990)]
  - Genus †Protolambda Osborn 1898 [Synconodon Osborn 1898]
  - Genus †Leptalestes Davis 2007
  - Genus †Aquiladelphis Fox 1971
  - Genus †Pediomys Marsh 1889
- Family †Stagodontidae Marsh 1889 sensu McKenna & Bell 1997
  - Genus †Boreodon Lambe 1902 (nomen dubium)
  - Genus †Pariadens Cifelli & Eaton 1987
  - Genus †Delphodon Simpson 1927
  - Genus †Eodelphis Matthew 1916
  - Genus †Didelphodon Marsh 1889 [Diaphorodon Archer 1869; Stagodon Marsh 1889; Thlaeodon Cope 1892; Ectoconodon Osborn 1898; Didelphops Marsh 1889]

==== Order †Simpsonitheria ====
- Genus †Hondonadia Goin & Candela 1998
- Superfamily †Caroloameghinioidea Ameghino 1901 sensu Marshall 1987
  - Genus †Hatcheritherium Case, Goin & Woodburne 2005
  - Family †Chulpasiidae Sigé et al. 2009
    - Genus †Chulpasia Crochet & Sigé 1993
  - Family †Glasbiidae Clemens 1966 sensu Archer 1984
    - Genus †Glasbius Clemens 1966
  - Family †Caroloameghiidae Ameghino 1901
    - Genus †Procaroloameghinia Marshall 1982
    - Genus †Robertbutleria Marshall 1987
    - Genus †Caroloameghinia Ameghino 1901
- Superfamily †Argyrolagoidea Ameghino 1904 sensu Simpson 1970
  - Family †Gashterniidae Marshall 1987
    - Genus †Gashternia Simpson 1935
  - Family †Argyrolagidae Ameghino 1904 [Microtragulidae Reig 1955]
    - Genus †Proargyrolagus Wolff 1984
    - Genus †Hondalagus Villarroel & Marshall 1988
    - Genus †Argyrolagus Ameghino 1904 [Microtragulus Ameghino 1904 McKenna & Bell 1997]
    - Genus †Microtragulus Ameghino 1904 [Argyrolagus Ameghino 1904 sensu McKenna & Bell 1997]

==== Order †Peradectia ====
- Family †Peradectidae Crochet 1979
  - Genus †Armintodelphys Krishtalka & Stucky 1983
  - Genus †Indodelphis Bajpai et al. 2005
  - Genus †Mimoperadectes Bown & Rose 1979
  - Genus †Nanodelphys McGrew 1937 Didelphidectes Hough 1961
  - Genus †Alloeodectes Russell 1984
  - Genus †Sinoperadectes Storch & Qui 2002
  - Genus †Siamoperadectes Ducrocq et al. 1992
  - Genus †Peradectes Matthew & Granger 1921 [Thylacodon Matthew & Granger 1921]

==== Order †Sparassodonta ====
- Genus †Dukecynus Goin 1997
- Genus †Pseudonotictis Marschall 1981
- Genus †Sallacyon Villarroel & Marshall 1982 [Andinogale Hoffstetter & Petter 1983]
- Family †Mayulestidae de Muizon 1994
  - Genus †Mayulestes de Muizon 1994
  - Genus †Allqokirus Marshall & de Muizon 1988
- Family †Proborhyaenidae Ameghino 1897 [Arminiheringiidae Ameghino 1902]
  - Genus †Arminiheringia Ameghino 1902 [Dilestes Ameghino 1902]
  - Genus †Callistoe Babot, Powell & Muizon 2002
  - Genus †Paraborhyaena Hoffstetter & Petter 1983
  - Genus †Proborhyaena Ameghino 1897
- Family †Prothylacinidae Ameghino 1894
  - Genus †Pseudothylacinus Ameghino 1902
  - Genus †Prothylacynus Ameghino 1891 [Prothylacocyon Winge 1923; Napodonictis Ameghino 1894]
  - Genus †Lycopsis Cabrera 1927
  - Genus †Stylocynus Mercerat 1917
  - Genus †Pseudolycopsis Marshall 1976
- Family †Thylacosmilidae Riggs 1933 sensu Marshall 1976
  - Genus †Achlysictis Ameghino 1891
  - Genus †Anachlysictis Goin 1997
  - Genus †Patagosmilus Forasiepi & Carlini 2010
  - Genus †Hyaenodontops Ameghino 1908 [?Thylacosmilus Riggs 1933]
  - Genus †Notosmilus Kraglievich 1960 [?Thylacosmilus Riggs 1933]
  - Genus †Thylacosmilus Riggs 1933 [?Notosmilus Kraglievich 1960; ?Hyaenodontops Ameghino 1908; Achlysictis Ameghino 1891; Acrohyaenodon Ameghino 1904]
- Family †Hathliacynidae Ameghino 1894 [Cladictidae Winge 1923; Cladosictidae Cabreta 1927; Cladosictinae Cabrera 1927; Acyonidae Ameghino 1889; Amphiproviverridae Ameghino 1894]
  - Genus †Patene Simpson 1935 [Ischyrodelphis de Paula Couto 1952]
  - Genus †Palaeocladosictis de Paula Couto 1961
  - Genus †Procladosictis Ameghino 1902
  - Genus †Contrerascynus Mones 2014 [Simpsonia Contreras 1990 non]
  - Genus †Pseudocladosictis Ameghino 1902
  - Genus †Notogale Loomis 1914
  - Genus †Cladosictis Ameghino 1887 [Amphithereutes Ameghino 1935; Agustylus Ameghino 1887; Hathliacynus Ameghino 1887; Ictioborus Ameghino 1891; Anatherium Ameghino 1887; Acyon Ameghino 1887]
  - Genus †Sipalocyon Ameghino 1887 [Thylacodictis Mercerat 1891; Amphiproviverra Ameghino 1891; Protoproviverra Ameghino 1891 non Lemoine 1891; Perathereutes Ameghino 1891]
  - Genus †Chasicostylus Reig 1957
  - Genus †Notictis Ameghino 1889
  - Genus †Notocynus Mercerat 1891
  - Genus †Borhyaenidium Pascual & Bocchino 1963 [Pascual & Ringuelet 1963]
- Family †Borhyaenidae Ameghino 1894 [Sparassodontidae Roger 1896; Conodonictidae Ameghino 1935] ()
  - Genus †Nemolestes Ameghino 1902
  - Genus †Argyrolestes Ameghino 1902
  - Genus †Angelocabrerus Simpson 1970
  - Genus †Australohyaena Forasiepi, Babot & Zimicz 2014
  - Genus †Fredszalaya Shockey & Anaya 2008
  - Genus †Pharsophorus Ameghino 1897 [Plesiofelis Roth 1903]
  - Genus †Borhyaena Ameghino 1887 [Arctodictis Mercerat 1891; Conodonictis Ameghino 1891; Dynamictis Ameghino 1891; Pseudoborhyaena Ameghino 1902]
  - Genus †Acrocyon Ameghino 1887
  - Genus †Eutemnodus Bravard 1858 [Eutemnodus Burmeister 1885; Apera Ameghino 1886 non Adanson 1763; Entemnodus Trouessant 1885]
  - Genus †Parahyaenodon Ameghino 1904

==== Order Didelphimorphia ====
- Family †Derorhynchidae Marshall 1987
  - Genus †Minusculodelphis de Paula Couto 1962
  - Genus †Derorhynchus de Paula Couto 1952
- Family †Sparassocynidae Reig 1958 sensu Archer 1984
  - Genus †Sparassocynus Mercerat 1898 [Perazoyphium Cebrera 1928]
- Family Didelphidae Gray 1821 (American opossums)
  - Genus †Incadelphys Marshall & de Muizon 1988
  - Genus †Coona Simpson 1938
  - Genus †Sairadelphys Oliveira et al. 2011
  - Subfamily †Eobrasiliinae Marshall 1987
    - Genus †Tiulordia Marshall & de Muizon 1988
    - Genus †Eobrasilia Simpson 1947
    - Genus †Gaylordia de Paula Couto 1952 [Xenodelphis de Paula Couto 1962]
    - Genus †Didelphopsis de Paula Couto 1952
  - Subfamily Didelphinae Grey 1821
    - Tribe Didelphini Grey 1821
      - Genus †Hyperdidelphys Ameghino 1904 [Paradidelphys Ameghino 1904; Cladodidelphys Ameghino 1904]
      - Genus †Thylophorops Reig 1952
    - Tribe Marmosini Hershkovitz 1992 [Monodelphinae Talice, de Mosera & Machado 1960 nomen nudum sensu Hershkovitz; Monodelphini Talice, de Mosera & Machado 1960 nomen nudum sensu McKenna & Bell 1997]
      - Subtribe †Zygolestina Marshall 1982
        - Genus †Zygolestes Ameghino 1898
      - Subtribe Monodelphina Talice, de Mosera & Machado 1960 [Marmosidae Hershkovitz 1992; Lestodelphyinae Hershkovitz 1992]
        - Genus †Thylatheridium Reig 1952

==== Order Paucituberculata ====
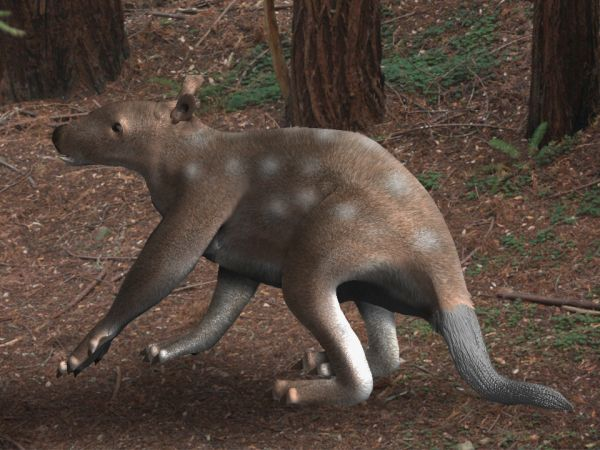
Ekaltadeta

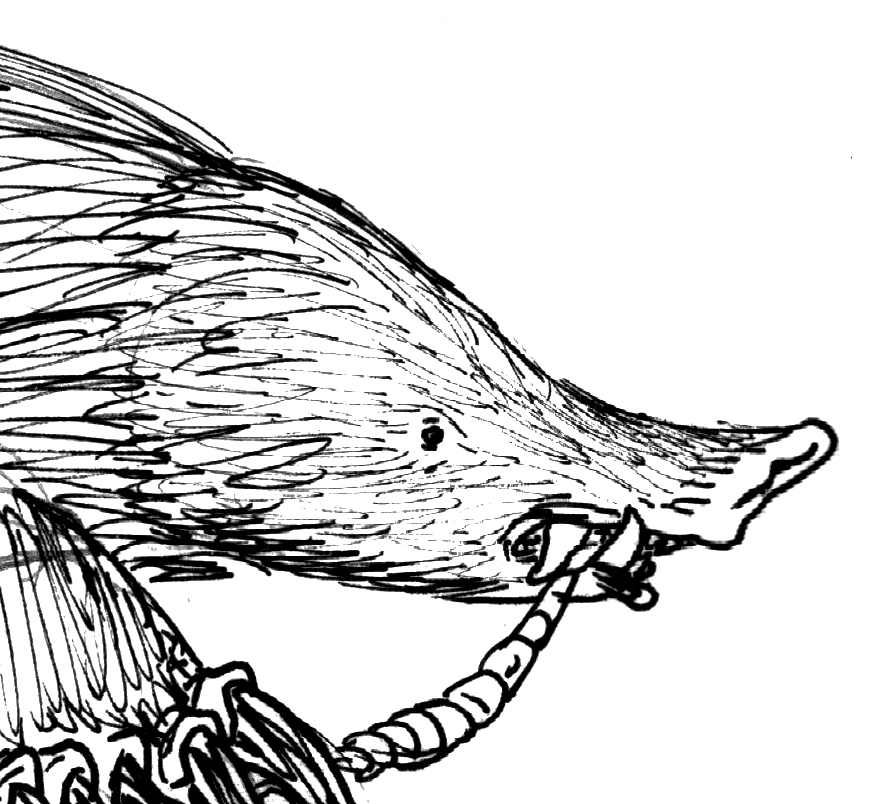
Necrolestes

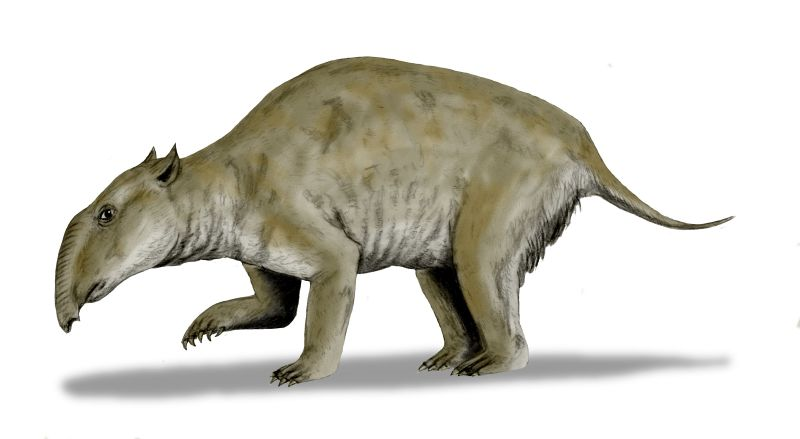
Palorchestes

- Genus †Bardalestes Goin et al. 2009 [Dracolestes Goin et al. 2009 nomen nudum
- Genus †Evolestes Goin et al. 2007
- Superfamily Caenolestoidea Trouessant 1898 sensu Osborn 1910 [Palaeothentoidea Goin et al. 2009]
  - Genus †Riolestes Goin et al. 2009
  - Genus †Carolopaulacoutoia McKenna & Bell 1997 [Sternbergia de Paula Couto 1970 non Jordan & Gilbert 1925]
  - Family †Palaeothentidae Sinclair 1906 [Epanorthidae Ameghino 1889; Decastidae Ameghino 1893 ]
    - Genus †Antawallathentes Rincón et al. 2015
    - Genus †Hondathentes Dumont & Bown 1997 [Hondathentes Dumont & Bown 1993 nomen nudum ]
    - Genus †Sasawatsu Goin & Candela 2004
    - Subfamily †Acdestinae Bown & Fleagle 1993
      - Genus †Acdestoides Bown & Fleagle 1993
      - Genus †Acdestodon Bown & Fleagle 1993
      - Genus †Trelewthentes Bown & Fleagle 1993
      - Genus †Acdestis Ameghino 1887 [Dipilus Ameghino 1890; Decastis Ameghino 1891; Callomenus Ameghino 1891]
    - Subfamily †Palaeothentinae Sinclair 1906
      - Genus †Palaeothentes Ameghino 1887 [Epanorthus Ameghino 1889; Essoprion Ameghino 1891; Halmadromus Ameghino 1891; Halmaselus Ameghino 1891; Metriodromus Ameghino 1894; Metaepanorthus Ameghino 1894; Paraepanorthus Ameghino 1894; Prepanorthus Ameghino 1894; Cladoclinus Ameghino 1894; Palaepanorthus Ameghino 1902]
      - Genus †Titanothentes Rae, Bown & Fleagle 1996
      - Genus †Pilchenia Ameghino 1903
      - Genus †Carlothentes Bown & Fleagle 1993
      - Genus †Propalaeothentes Bown & Fleagle 1993
  - Family †Abderitidae Ameghino 1889
    - Genus †Pitheculites Ameghino 1902 [Eomannodon Ameghino 1902b; Micrabderites Simpson 1932]
    - Genus †Abderites Ameghino 1887 [Homunculites Ameghino 1902; Homunculites Ameghino 1901 nomen nudum]
  - Family Caenolestidae Trouessant 1898 Garzoniidae Ameghino 1890] (Shrew Opossums)
    - Genus †Fieratherium Forasiepi et al. 2013
    - Genus †Perulestes Goin & Candela 2004
    - Subfamily †Pichipilinae Marshall 1980 sensu McKenna & Bell 1997
      - Genus †Pichipilus Ameghino 1890
      - Genus †Phonocdromus Ameghino 1894
      - Genus †Pliolestes Reig 1955
    - Subfamily Caenolestinae Trouessant 1898
      - Genus †Pseudhalmarhiphus Ameghino 1903
      - Genus †Stilotherium Ameghino 1887 [Garzonia Ameghino 1891; Halmatorhiphus Winge 1923; Parhalmarhiphus Ameghino 1894; Halmarhiphus Ameghino 1891]

==== Order †Polydolopimorphia ====
- Family †Protodidelphidae Marshall 1987
  - Genus †Carolocoutoia Goin, Oliveira & Candela 1998
  - Genus †Bobbschaefferia de Paula Couto 1970 [Schaefferia Paula Couto 1952 non Absolon 1900 non Houbert 1918; Depaulacoutonia Kretzoi & Kretzoi 2000]
  - Genus †Zeusdelphys Marshall 1982
  - Genus †Periprotodidelphis Oliveira & Goin 2011
  - Genus †Protodidelphis de Paula Couto 1952 [Robertbutleria Marshall 1987]
  - Genus †Guggenheimia de Paula Couto 1952
  - Genus †Reigia Pascual 1983
- Superfamily †Polydolopoidea Ameghino 1897 sensu Clemens & Marshall 1976
  - Genus †Rosendolops Goin & Candela 1996
  - Genus †Ectocentrocristus Rigby & Wolberg 1987 sensu Case, Goin & Woodburne 2005
  - Family †Sillustaniidae Crochet & Sigé 1996
    - Genus †Sillustania Crochet & Sigé 1996
  - Family †Bonapartheriidae Pascual 1980 [Epidolopinae Pascual & Bond 1981 non Marshall 1982]
    - Genus †Epidolops de Paula Couto 1952 sensu Goin & al 2003
    - Genus †Bonapartherium Pascual 1980
  - Family †Prepidolopidae Pascual 1980
    - Genus †Prepidolops Pascual 1980
    - Genus †Wamradolops Goin & Candela 2004
    - Genus †Incadolops Goin & Candela 2004
  - Family †Polydolopidae Ameghino 1897 [Promysopidae Ameghino 1902]
    - Genus †Roberthoffstetteria Marshall, de Muizon & Sigé 1983 sensu Goin & al 2003
    - Subfamily Parabderitinae Marshall 1980 sensu McKenna & Bell 1997
      - Genus †Parabderites Ameghino 1902 [Tideus Ameghino 1890 non Koch 1837; Mannodon Ameghino 1893]
    - Subfamily Polydolopinae Ameghino 1897 sensu Pascual & Bond 1981
      - Genus †Polydolops Ameghino 1897 [Pliodolops Ameghino 1902; Orthodolops Ameghino 1903; Anissodolops Ameghino 1903; Archaeodolops Ameghino 1903; Antarctodolops Woodburne & Zinsmeister 1984]
      - Genus †Amphidolops Ameghino 1902 [Anadolops Ameghino 1903; Seumadia Simpson 1935]
      - Genus †Eudolops Ameghino 1902 [Promysops Ameghino 1902; Propolymastodon Ameghin 1903]
      - Genus †Pseudolops Ameghino 1902
      - Genus †Eurydolops Case, Woodburne & Chaney 1988

==== Order †Yalkaparidontia ====
- Family †Yalkaparidontidae Archer, Hand & Godthelp 1988
  - Genus †Yalkaparidon Archer, Hand & Godthelp 1988 [Thingodonta; Yalkaperidon (sic)]

==== Order Notoryctemorphia ====
- Family Notoryctidae Ogilby 1892 (marsupial moles)
  - Genus †Naraboryctes Archer et al. 2010

==== Order Dasyuromorphia ====
- Genus †Mayigriphus Wroe 1997b
- Genus †Joculosium Wroe 1999b
- Family Thylacinidae Bonaparte 1838 (marsupial wolves)
  - Genus †Maximucinus Wroe 2001
  - Genus †Muribacinus Wroe 1996
  - Genus †Mutpuracinus Murray & Megirian 2000
  - Genus †Badjcinus Muirhead & Wroe 1998
  - Genus †Nimbacinus Muirhead & Archer 1990
  - Genus †Ngamalacinus Muirhead 1997
  - Genus †Wabulacinus Muirhead 1997
  - Genus †Tyarrpecinus Murray & Megirian 2000
  - Genus †Thylacinus Temminck 1827 [Paracyon Gray 1842; Paracyon Gray 1827 nomen nudum; Peracyon Gray 1825 nomen nudum; Peralopex Gloger 1841; Lycaon (sic) Wagler 1830 non Brookes 1827]
- Family Dasyuridae Goldfuss 1820 (marsupial mice and allies)
  - Genus †Archerium Wroe & Mackness 2000
  - Genus †Ganbulanyi Wroe 1998
  - Genus †Glaucodon Stirton 1957
  - Subfamily †Barinyainae Wroe 1999
    - Genus †Barinya Wroe 1999
  - Subfamily Dasyurinae Goldfuss 1820
    - Tribe Dasyurini Goldfuss 1820 [Phascolosoricinae Archer 1982; Parantechini Archer 1982]
      - Genus †Wakamatha Archer & Rich 1979
      - Genus †Dasylurinja Archer 1982 [McKenna & Bell 1997]
      - Genus †Ankotarinja Archer 1976 [Archer 1982]
      - Genus †Keeuna Archer 1976

==== Order Peramelemorphia ====
- Genus †Crash Travouillon et al. 2014
- Genus †Kutjamarcoot Chamberlain et al. 2016
- Genus †Thylacotinga Archer, Godthelp & Hand 1993
- Superfamily †Yaraloidea Muirhead 2000
  - Family †Yaralidae Muirhead 2000
    - Genus †Yarala Muirhead & Filan 1995
- Superfamily Perameloidea Gray 1825 sensu Waterhouse 1838
  - Genus †Galadi Travouillon et al. 2010
  - Genus †Bulungu Gurovichet al. 2013
  - Genus †Madju Travouillon et al. 2015
  - Family Thylacomyidae Archer & Kirsch 1977 (rabbit-eared bandicoots/bilbies)
    - Genus †Ischnodon Stirton 1955
    - Genus †Liyamayi Travouillon et al. 2014
  - Family Peramelidae Gray 1825 (Australian bandicoots)
  - Family †Chaeropodidae Gill 1872 (pig-footed bandicoots)
    - Genus †Chaeropus Ogilby 1838
  - Family Peroryctidae Archer et al. 1989 (New Guinean bandicoots)

==== Order Microbiotheria ====
- Family Woodburnodontidae Goin et al. 2007
  - Genus †Woodburnodon Goin et al. 2007
- Family Microbiotheriidae Ameghino 1887 [Clenialitidae Ameghino1909; Mirandatheriinae Szalay 1994] (Monito del Monte)
  - Genus †Khasia Marshall & de Muizon 1988
  - Genus †Mirandatherium Paula Couto 1952 [Mirandaia Paula Couto 1952 non Travassos 1937]
  - Genus †Microbiotherium Ameghino 1887 [Stylognathus Ameghino 1891; Eodidelphys Ameghino 1891; Prodidelphys Ameghino 1891; Hadrorhynchus Ameghino 1891; Proteodidelphys Ameghino 1898; Oligobiotherium Ameghino 1902; Clenia Ameghino 1904; Clenialites Ameghino 1906; Microbiotheridion Ringuelet 1953]
  - Genus †Eomicrobiotherium Marshall 1982
  - Genus †Ideodelphys Ameghino 1902 [Ideodidelphys Schlosser 1923]
  - Genus †Kirutherium Goin & Candela 2004
  - Genus †Pachybiotherium Ameghino 1902
  - Genus †Pitheculus Ameghino 1894

==== Order Diprotodontia ====
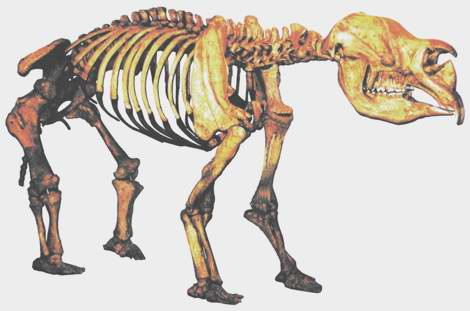
Diprotodon

- Genus †Brachalletes de Vis 1883
- Genus †Koalemus de Vis 1889
- Genus †Sthenomerus de Vis 1883
- Genus †Nimbadon Hand et al. 1993
- Family †Palorchestidae Tate 1948
  - Genus †Propalorchestes Murray 1986
  - Genus †Ngapakaldia Stirton 1967
  - Genus †Palorchestes Owen 1874 [Palorchestes Owen 1873 nomen nudum]
  - Genus †Pitikantia Stirton 1967
- Family †Wynyardiidae Osgood 1921
  - Genus †Wynyardia Spencer 1901
  - Genus †Muramura Pledge 1987
  - Genus †Namilamadeta Rich & Archer 1979 [Wombaroo]
- Family †Thylacoleonidae Gill 1872 (marsupial lions)
  - Genus †Priscileo Rauscher 1987
  - Genus †Thylacoleo Owen 1848 [Thylacoleon Winge 1893; Schizodon Stutchbury 1853 non Agassiz 1829 non Waterhouse 1842; Plectodon Krefft 1870; Prochaeris De Vis 1886; Thylacopardus Owen 1888]
  - Genus †Wakaleo Clemens & Plane 1974
- Suborder Vombatiformes
  - Superfamily Phascolarctoidea Woodburne 1984
    - Family Phascolarctidae Owen 1839 [Koalidae Burnett 1830]
      - Genus †Cundokoala Pledge 1992b
      - Genus †Nimiokoala Black & Archer 1997
      - Genus †Perikoala Stirton 1957
      - Genus †Madakoala Woodburne et al. 1987
      - Genus †Litokoala Stirton, Tedford & Woodburne 1967
      - Genus †Koobor Archer 1976
  - Superfamily Vombatoidea Burnett 1830
    - Family †Ilariidae Tedford & Woodburne 1987
      - Genus †Kuterintja Pledge 1987
      - Genus †Ilaria Tedford & Woodburne 1987
    - Family Vombatidae Burnett 1830 [Phascolomidae Gray 1821; Phascolomyidae Owen 1839] (wombats)
      - Genus †Nimbavombatus Brewer et al. 2015
      - Genus †Phascolonus Owen 1827 [Sceparnodon Ramsay 1881 non Ramsay 1880] (giant wombat)
      - Genus †Ramsayia Tate 1951
      - Genus †Rhizophascolonus Stirton, Tedford & Woodburne 1967
      - Genus †Sedophascolomys Louys 2015
      - Genus †Warendja Hope & Wilkinson 1982
    - Family †Diprotodontidae Gill 1872 [Nototheriidae Lydekker 1887]
      - Genus †Bematherium Tedford 1967
      - Genus †Pyramios Woodburne 1967
      - Genus †Nototherium Owen 1845
      - Genus †Meniscolophus Stirton 1955
      - Genus †Euryzygoma Longman 1921
      - Genus †Diprotodon Owen 1838 [Diarcodon Stephenson 1963]
      - Genus †Euowenia de Vis 1891 [Owenia de Vis 1888 non Presch 1847 non Delle Chiaje 1841]
      - Genus †Stenomerus de Vis 1907
- Suborder Phalangeriformes Szalay 1982
  - Family Burramyidae Broom 1898 (pygmy possum)
  - Family Phalangeridae Thomas 1888 (cuscuses and allies)
  - Family †Pilkipildridae Archer, Tedford & Rich 1987
    - Genus †Djilgaringa Archer, Tedford & Rich 1987
    - Genus †Pilkipildra Archer, Tedford & Rich 1987
  - Family †Ektopodontidae Stirton, Tedford & Woodburne 1967
    - Genus †Chunia Woodburne & Clemens 1986
    - Genus †Darcius Rich 1986
    - Genus †Ektopodon Stirton, Tedford & Woodburne 1967
  - Family †Miralinidae Woodburn, Pledge & Archer 1987
    - Subfamily †Durudawirinae Crosby & Archer 2000
      - Genus †Durudawirini Crosby & Archer 2000
    - Subfamily †Miralininae Woodburn, Pledge & Archer 1987 sensu Crosby & Archer 2000
      - Genus †Barguru Schwartz 2006
      - Genus †Miralina Woodburn, Pledge & Archer 1987
- Suborder Macropodiformes
  - Superfamily Petauroidea
    - Family Pseudocheiridae
      - Genus †Paljara Woodburne, Tedford & Archer 1987
      - Genus †Pildra Woodburne, Tedford & Archer 1987
      - Genus †Marlu Woodburne, Tedford & Archer 1987
      - Genus †Pseudokoala Turnbull & Lundelius 1970
  - Superfamily Macropodoidea Szalay 1987
    - Genus †Ekaltadeta Archer & Flannery 1985
    - Genus †Galanarla Flannery, Archer & Plane 1983
    - Genus †Nowidgee Cooke 1997
    - Genus †Purtia Case 1984
    - Genus †Wakiewakie Woodburne 1984
    - Family †Palaeopotoroinae Flannery & Rich 1986
      - Genus †Palaeopotorous Flannery & Rich 1986
    - Family †Balbaridae Flannery, Archer & Plane 1983 sensu Kear et al. 2007
      - Genus †Nambaroo Kear et al. 2007
      - Genus †Wururoo Cooke 1997
      - Genus †Ganawamaya Cooke 1992
      - Genus †Balbaroo Flannery, Archer & Plane 1983
    - Family Hypsiprymnodontidae Collett 1887 sensu Kear et al. 2007 [Pleopodidae Owen 1878] (musky rat kangaroo)
      - Genus †Jackmahoneya Ride 1993
      - Genus †Propleopus Longman 1924 [Triclis de Vis 1888 non Loew 1851]
    - Family Potoroidae Gray 1821 [Bettongiinae Bensley 1903; Propleopodidae Archer & Flannery 1985] (rat kangaroos)
      - Genus †Gumardee Flannery, Archer & Plane 1983
      - Genus †Milliyowi Flannery et al. 1992
      - Genus †Dorcopsoides Woodburne 1967
      - Genus †Kurrabi Flannery & Archer 1984
      - Genus †Watutia Flannery & Hoch 1989
    - Family Macropodidae Gray 1821 sensu Kear et al. 2007 [Halmaturidae Bonaparte 1831; Kangaroidae Gray 1858] (kangaroos and allies)
      - Genus †Ganguroo Kean, Archer & Flannery 2001
      - Genus †Wabularoo Archer 1979
      - Subfamily †Bulungamayinae Flannery, Archer & Plane 1983
        - Genus †Bulungamaya Flannery, Archer & Plane 1983
        - Genus †Cookeroo Butler et al. 2016
      - Subfamily †Sthenurinae Glauert 1926
        - Tribe Hadronomini
          - Genus †Hadronomas Woodburne 1967
        - Tribe Sthenurini Szalay 1994
          - Genus †Eosthenurus
          - Genus †Sthenurus Owen 1874a
          - Genus †Metasthenurus Prideaux 2004
          - Genus †Archaeosimos Prideaux 2004
          - Genus †Simosthenurus Tedford 1966
          - Genus †Procoptodon Owen 1874b [Pachysiagon Owen 1874; Pachysiagon Owen 1873 nomen nudum; Simosthenurus Tedford 1966]
      - Subfamily Macropodinae Gray 1821 [Protemnodontinae De Vis 1883]
        - Genus †Prionotemnus Stirton 1955
        - Genus †Congruus McNamara 1994
        - Genus †Synaptodon de Vis 1889 [Synaptodus Lydekker 1890]
        - Genus †Fissuridon Bartholomai 1973
        - Tribe Lagostrophini
          - Genus †Protemnodon Owen 1873
          - Genus †Troposodon Bartholomai 1967
        - Tribe Macropodini Gray 1821 [Halmaturini Goldfuss 1820]
          - Genus †Baringa Flannery & Hahn 1984
          - Genus †Bohra Flannery & Szalay 1982

=== Infraclass Eutheria ===
==== Basal Eutheria ====
- Genus †Beleutinus Bazhanov 1972 [nomen dubium] [?zalambdalestid or deltatheroid?]
- Genus †Cretasorex Nesov & Gureyev 1981 [nomen dubium]
- Genus †Eodesmatodon Zheng & Chi 1978
- Genus †Eutrochodon Roth 1903
- Genus †Heliosus Sudre 1979
- Genus †Horolodectes Scott, Webb & Fox 2006
- Genus †Hyotheridium Gregory & Simpson 1926
- Genus †Idiogenomys Ostrander 1983
- Genus †Neodesmostylus Khomenko 1928
- Genus †Obtususdon Xu 1977
- Genus †Prozalambdalestes
- Genus †Sazlestes Nesov 1997
- Genus †Telacodon Marsh 1892 [? Leptictida]
- Genus †Tingamarra Godthelp et al. 1992
- Genus †Wanotherium Tang & Yan 1976
- Genus †Veratalpa Ameghino 1905 [?rodent, is based on an astragalus (Hutchison 1974)]

==== Eutheria incertae sedis ====
- Genus †Acristatherium Hu et al. 2009
- Genus †Juramaia Luo et al. 2011
- Genus †Eomaia Ji et al. 2002
- Genus †Prokennalestes Kielan-Jaworowska & Dashzeveg 1989
- Genus †Murtoilestes Averianov & Skutschas 2001
- Genus †Bobolestes Nesov 1985 [Otlestes Nesov 1985]
- Genus †Montanalestes Cifelli 2000
- Genus †Eozhelestes Nesov 1997
- Genus †Paranyctoides Fox 1979 sensu Averianov & Archibald 2013 [Sailestes Nesov 1982]
- Genus †Bulaklestes Nesov 1985
- Genus †Uchkudukodon Archibald & Averianov 2006
- Genus †Daulestes Trofimov & Nesov 1979
- Genus †Maelestes
- Family †Kulbeckiidae Nesov 1993
  - Genus †Kulbeckia Nesov 1993
- Family †Ocepeiidae Gheerbrant et al. 2014
  - Genus †Ocepeia Gheerbrant & Sudre 2001
- Family †Zalambdalestidae Gregory & Simpson 1926
  - Genus †Anchilestes Qiu & Li 1977 [?Esthonychidae]
  - Genus †Zhangolestes Zan et al. 2006
  - Genus †Alymlestes Averianov & Nesov 1995
  - Genus †Barunlestes Kielan-Jaworowska 1975
  - Genus †Zalambdalestes Gregory & Simpson 1926

==== Basal Ungulatomorpha ====
- Genus †Borisodon Archibald & Averianov 2011
- Genus †Mistralestes Tabuce et al. 2013
- Genus †Sheikhdzheilia Averianov & Archibald 2005
- Genus †Sorlestes Nesov 1985
- Family †Lainodontinae Gheerbrant & Astibia 2012
  - Genus †Valentinella Tabuce, Vianey-Liaud & Garcia 2004
  - Genus †Labes Buscalioni et al. 1992
  - Genus †Lainodon Gheerbrant & Astibia 1994

==== Order †Asioryctitheria ====
- Genus †Sasayamamylos Kusuhashi et al. 2013
- Family †Kennalestidae Kielan-Jaworowska 1981
  - Genus †Kennalestes Kielan-Jaworowska 1969
- Family †Asioryctitheriidae Szalay 1977 (nomen nudum) [Asioryctidae Kielan-Jaworowska 1981]
  - Genus †Ukhaatherium Novacek et al. 1997
  - Genus †Asioryctes Kielan-Jaworowska 1975

==== Order †Didelphodonta ====
- Genus †Ilerdoryctes Marandat 1989
- Genus †Naranius Russell & Dashzeveg 1986
- Genus †Paleotomus Van Valen 1967 [Niphredil Van Valen 1978] [?palaeoryctid; Pantolestidae]
- Genus †Puercolestes Reynolds 1936
- Genus †Suratilestes Bajpai et al. 2005
- Genus †Tinerhodon Gheerbrant 1995 [?Hyaenodontidae]
- Family †Didelphodontidae Matthew 1918 [?palaeoryctid]
  - Genus †Didelphodus Cope 1882b [Didelphyodus Winge 1923; Phenacops Matthew 1909]
  - Genus †Avunculus Van Valen 1966
  - Genus †Acmeodon Matthew & Granger 1921
  - Genus †Gelastops Simpson 1935d [Emperodon Simpson 1935d]
- Family †Cimolestidae Marsh 1889
  - Genus †Alveugena Eberle 1999
  - Genus †Maelestes Wible et al. 2007
  - Genus †Betonnia Williamson, Weil & Standhardt 2011
  - Genus †Chacopterygus Williamson, Weil & Standhardt 2011
  - Genus †Altacreodus Fox 2015
  - Genus †Ambilestes Fox 2015
  - Genus †Scollardius Fox 2015
  - Genus †Gallolestes Lillegraven 1976 [zhelestid?; Leptictida?]
  - Genus †Procerberus Sloan & Van Valen 1965
  - Genus †Telacodon Marsh 1892
  - Genus †Cimolestes Marsh 1889 [Nyssodon Simpson 1927; Puercolestes Reynolds 1936]

==== Order †Ptolemaiida ====
- Family †Kelbidae Cote et al. 2007
  - Genus †Kelba Savage 1965 [Kenyalutra Schmidt-Kittler 1987; Ndamathaia Jacobs et al. 1987 sensu Morales et al. 2000]
- Family †Ptolemaiidae Osborn 1908
  - Genus †Qarunavus Simons & Gingerich 1974
  - Genus †Cleopatrodon Bown & Simons 1987
  - Genus †Ptolemaia Osborn 1908 non McCutcheon & Wilson 1961

==== Order †Bibymalagasia ====
- Family †Plesiorycteropodidae Patterson 1975 (?-1000 AD)
  - Genus †Plesiorycteropus Filhol 1895 [Myoryctes Forsyth Major 1908 non Ebert 1863; Majoria Thomas 1915 non]

==== Order Tubulidentata ====
- Family Orycteropodidae (Gray 1821) Bonaparte 1850 (Aardvarks Eocene?–Recent)
  - Genus †Scotaeops Ameghino 1887
  - Genus †Palaeorycteropus Filhol 1893
  - Genus †Archaeorycteropus Ameghino 1905
  - Genus †Myorycteropus MacInnes 1956
  - Genus †Leptorycteropus Patterson 1975
  - Genus †Amphiorycteropus Lehmann 2009

==== Order Macroscelidea ====
- Family Macroscelididae Bonaparte 1838 (elephant shrews)
  - Genus †Brevirhynchocyon Senut & Georgalis 2014 [Brachyrhynchocyon Senut 2008 non Scott & Jepsen 1936] (elephant shrew)
  - Subfamily †Herodotiinae Simons, Holroyd & Bown 1991
    - Genus †Nementchatherium Tabuce et al. 2001
    - Genus †Chambius Hartenberger 1986
    - Genus †Herodotius Simons, Holroyd & Bown 1991
  - Subfamily †Metoldobotinae Simons, Holroyd & Bown 1991
    - Genus †Metoldobotes Schlosser 1910
  - Subfamily Rhynchocyoninae Gill 1872
    - Genus †Miorhynchocyon Butler 1984
  - Subfamily †Mylomygalinae Patterson 1965
    - Genus †Mylomygale Broom & Schepers 1948
  - Subfamily †Myohyracinae Andrews 1914
    - Genus †Myohyrax Andrews 1914
    - Genus †Protypotheroides Stromer 1922
  - Subfamily Macroscelidinae Bonaparte 1838 [Macroscelinae]
    - Genus †Miosengi Grossman & Holroyd 2009
    - Genus †Pronasilio Butler 1984
    - Genus †Palaeothentoides Stromer 1932
    - Genus †Hiwegicyon Butler 1984

==== Order Afrosoricida ====
- Family †Todralestidae Gheerbrant 1994 [?Pantolestinae]
  - Genus †Todralestes Gheerbrant 1991
- Family †Adapisoriculidae Van Valen 1967
  - Genus †Adapisoriculus Lemoine 1885 [Nycticonodon Quinet 1964]
  - Genus †Bustylus Gheerbrant & Russell 1991
  - Genus †Proremiculus De Bast, Sigé & Smith 2012
  - Genus †Remiculus Russell 1964 [?Nyctitheriinae]
- Suborder Tenrecomorpha Butler 1972 sensu Seiffert 2010
  - Genus †Garatherium Crochet 1984
  - Family †
    - Genus †Afrodon Gheerbrant 1988
    - Genus †Dilambdogale Seiffert 2010
    - Genus †Widanelfarasia Seiffert & Simons 2000
  - Family †Protenrecinae Butler 1969
    - Genus †Protenrec Butler & Hopwood 1957
    - Genus †Erythrozootes Butler & Hopwood 1957
  - Superfamily Chrysochloroidea Broom 1915
    - Family Chrysochloridae Gray 1825 (golden moles and relatives)
      - Genus †Eochrysochloris Seiffert et al. 2007
      - Subfamily †Prochrysochlorinae Butler 1984
        - Genus †Prochrysochloris Butler & Hopwood 1957
      - Subfamily Chrysochlorinae [Amblysominae Simonetta 1957; Eremitalpinae Simonetta 1957]
        - Genus †Proamblysomus Broom 1941
  - Superfamily Tenrecoidea Simpson 1931 [Zalambdodonta] (tenrecs and relatives)
    - Genus †Qatranilestes Seiffert 2010
    - Family Tenrecidae Gray 1821 [Centetidae] (tenrecs, Madagascar hedgehogs)
      - Subfamily Geogalinae Trouessart 1881 (large-eared tenrecs)
        - Genus †Parageogale Butler 1984 [Butleriella Poduschka & Poduschka 1985]
      - Subfamily †Protenrecinae Butler 1969
        - Genus †Protenrec Butler & Hopwood 1957
        - Genus †Erythrozootes Butler & Hopwood 1957

==== Order Hyracoidea ====
Oligocene–Recent

- Genus †Dimaitherium Barrow, Seiffert & Simons 2010
- Genus †Hengduanshanhyrax Chen 2003
- Genus †Namahyrax Pickford et al. 2008
- Genus †Rukwalorax Stevens, O'Connor & Roberts 2009
- Family Procaviidae Thomas 1892 [Hyracidae Gray 1821] (hyraxes)
  - Genus †Prohyrax Stromer 1926
  - Genus †Gigantohyrax Kitching 1965
- Family †Pliohyracidae Osborn 1899
  - Genus †Brachyhyrax Pickford 2004
  - Genus †Seggeurius Crochet 1986
  - Genus †Microhyrax Sudre 1979
  - Subfamily †Geniohyinae Andrews 1906 non Matsumoto 1926
    - Genus †Geniohyus Andrews 1904a
  - Subfamily †Pliohyracinae Osborn 1899 non Matsumoto 1926
    - Genus †Sogdohyrax Dubrovo 1978
    - Genus †Kvabebihyrax Gabunia & Vekua 1966
    - Genus †Parapliohyrax Lavocat 1961
    - Genus †Pliohyrax Osborn 1899 [Leptodon Gaudry 1860 non Sundevall 1835; Neoschizotherium Viret 1947]
    - Genus †Postschizotherium von Koenigswald 1932
  - Subfamily †Saghatheriinae Andrews 1906 [Titanohyracinae Matsumoto 1926]
    - Genus †Meroehyrax Whitworth 1954
    - Genus †Bunohyrax Schlosser 1910
    - Genus †Pachyhyrax Schlosser 1910
    - Genus †Thyrohyrax Meyer 1973
    - Genus †Megalohyrax Andrews 1903 non Schlosser 1911 [Mixohyrax Schlosser 1910]
    - Genus †Selenohyrax Rasmussen & Simons 1988
    - Genus †Saghatherium Andrews & Beadnell 1902
    - Genus †Afrohyrax Pickford 2004
    - Genus †Antilohyrax Rasmussen & Simons 2000
    - Genus †Titanohyrax Matsumoto 1922 [Megalohyrax Schlosser 1911 non Andrews 1903]

==== Order Sirenia ====
Eocene–Recent

- Genus †Priscosiren Velez-Juarbe & Domning 2014
- Genus †Sirenotherium Paula Couto 1967
- Genus †Anisosiren Kordos 1979
- Genus †Indosiren von Koenigswald 1952
- Genus †Miodugong Deraniyagala 1969
- Genus †Paralitherium Kordos 1977
- Genus †Sirenavus Kretzoi 1941
- Family †Archaeosirenidae Abel 1914
  - Genus †Eosiren Andrews 1902 [Archaeosiren Abel 1913]
- Family †Prorastomidae Cope 1889
  - Genus †Pezosiren Domning 2001
  - Genus †Prorastomus Owen 1855
- Family †Protosirenidae Sickenberg 1934
  - Genus †Ashokia Bajpai et al. 2009
  - Genus †Protosiren Abel 1907
- Family †Eotheroididae Kretzoi 1941
  - Genus †Eotheroides Trouessart 1905 [Eotherium Owen 1875 non Leidy 1853; Masrisiren Kretzoi 1941]
- Family †Prototheriidae Kretzoi 1941
  - Genus †Prototherium de Zigno 1887 [Mesosiren Abel 1906; Paraliosiren Abel 1906]
- Family †Halitheriidae Gill 1872
  - Genus †Halitherium Kaup 1855 [Pugmeodon Kaup 1838]
- Family Trichechidae Gill 1871 [Manatidae Gray 1821] (manatees)
  - Subfamily Miosireninae Abel 1919
    - Genus †Prohalicore Flot 1887
    - Genus †Anomotherium Siegfried 1965
    - Genus †Miosiren Dollo 1889
  - Subfamily Trichechinae Gill 1872 [Halicorea Brandt 1846; Halicoreae Brandt 1833; Manatida Brandt 1868; Manatidae; Manatoidea Gill 1872; Trichechoidea Gill 1872]
    - Genus †Potamosiren Reinhart 1951
    - Genus †Ribodon Ameghino 1883
- Family Dugongidae (Gray 1821) Simpson 1932 [Halicoridae Gray 1825] (sea cows)
  - Genus †Caribosiren Reinhard 1959
  - Subfamily Metaxytheriinae Kretzoi 1941 [Halinassinae Reinhart 1959]
    - Genus †Metaxytherium de Christol 1840 [Cheirotherium Bruno 1839 non Kaup 1835; Felsinotherium Capellini 1872; Fucotherium Kaup 1840; Halianassa von Meyer 1838; Halysiren Kretzoi 1941; Haplosiren Kretzoi 1951; Hesperosiren Simpson 1932; Pontotherium Kaup 1840]
  - Subfamily Hydrodamalinae (Palmer 1895) sensu Simpson 1932 Rytinidae Girard 1852] (North Pacific sea cows)
    - Genus †Dusisiren Domning 1978
    - Genus †Hydrodamalis Retzius 1794 [Dystomus Fischer von Waldheim 1813; Haligyna Billberg 1827; Manati Steller 1774; Nepus Fischer von Waldheim 1814; Rhytina Berthold 1827; Sirene Link 1794; Stellerus Desmarest 1822]
  - Subfamily Dugonginae (Gray 1821) Simpson 1932 [Halicorinae Abel 1913; Rhytiodinae Abel 1914; Rytiodontinae Kretzoi 1941; Thelriopiinae Pilleri 1987] (dugongs)
    - Genus †Callistosiren Velez-Juarbe & Domning 2015
    - Genus †Nanosiren Domning & Aguilera 2008
    - Genus †Domningia Thewissen & Bajpai 2009
    - Genus †Kutchisiren Bajpai et al. 2010
    - Genus †Crenatosiren Domning 1991
    - Genus †Bharatisiren Bajpai & Domning 1997
    - Genus †Corystosiren Domning 1990
    - Genus †Rytiodus Lartet 1866
    - Genus †Dioplotherium Cope 1883
    - Genus †Xenosiren Domning 1989

==== Order †Embrithopoda ====
Eocene-Oligocene

- Genus †Namatherium Pickford et al. 2008
- Genus †Radinskya McKenna et al. 1989
- Genus †Heptoconodon Zdansky 1930 [?Lunania Chow 1957 non Hooker]
- Family †Arsinoitheriidae Andrews 1904
  - Genus †Arsinoitherium Beadnell 1902
- Family †Palaeoamasiidae Şen & Heintz 1979
  - Genus †Hypsamasia Maas, Thewissen & Kappelman 1998
  - Genus †Palaeoamasia Ozansoy 1966 [Palaeoamasia Sen & Heintz 1979 nomen dubious]
  - Genus †Crivadiatherium Radulesco, Iliesco & Iliesco 1976 [nomen dubious]

==== Order †Desmostylia ====
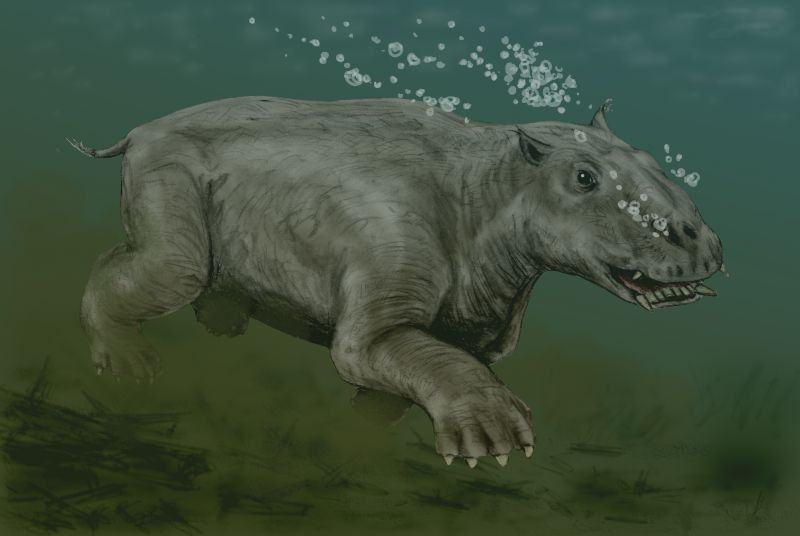
Paleoparadoxia

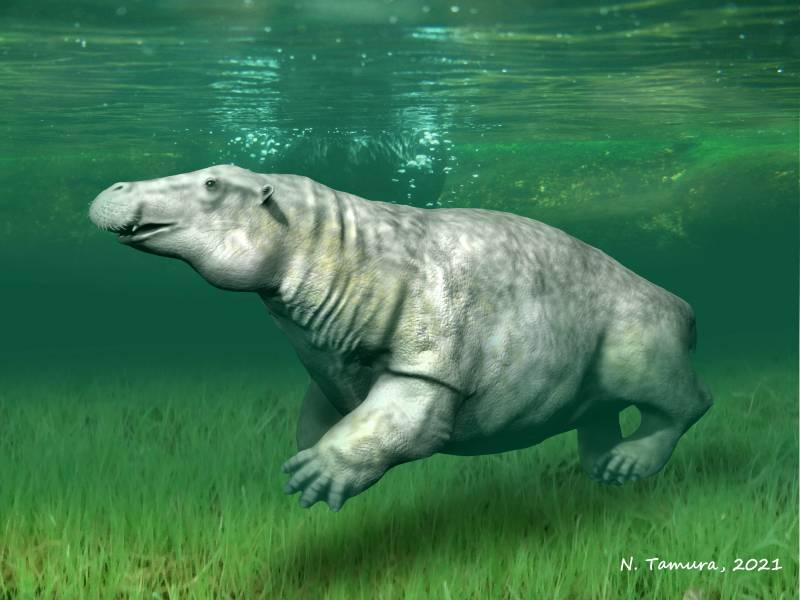
Desmostylus

- Family †Desmostylidae Osborn 1905 [Cornwallidae Shikama 1957; Paleoparadoxiidae Reinhart 1953] (Miocene–Pliocene)
  - Genus †Ounalashkastylus Chiba et al. 2015
  - Genus †Seuku Beatty & Cockburn 2015
  - Genus †Jamilcotatus Aranda-Manteca & Barnes 1998 [nomen nudum]
  - Genus †Vanderhoofius Reinhart 1959
  - Genus †Ashoroa Inuzuka 2000
  - Subfamily Behemotopsinae Inuzuka 1987
    - Genus †Behemotops Domning, Ray & McKenna 1986
  - Subfamily Cornwalliinae Shikama 1957
    - Genus †Cornwallius Hay 1923
  - Subfamily Desmostylinae
    - Genus †Desmostylus Marsh 1888 [Desmostylella Nagao 1937; Kronokotherium Pronina 1957]
  - Subfamily Paleoparadoxiinae (Reinhart 1959) Barnes 2013
    - Genus †Archaeoparadoxia Barnes 2013
    - Genus †Paleoparadoxia Reinhart 1959
    - Genus †Neoparadoxia Barnes 2013

==== Order Proboscidea ====
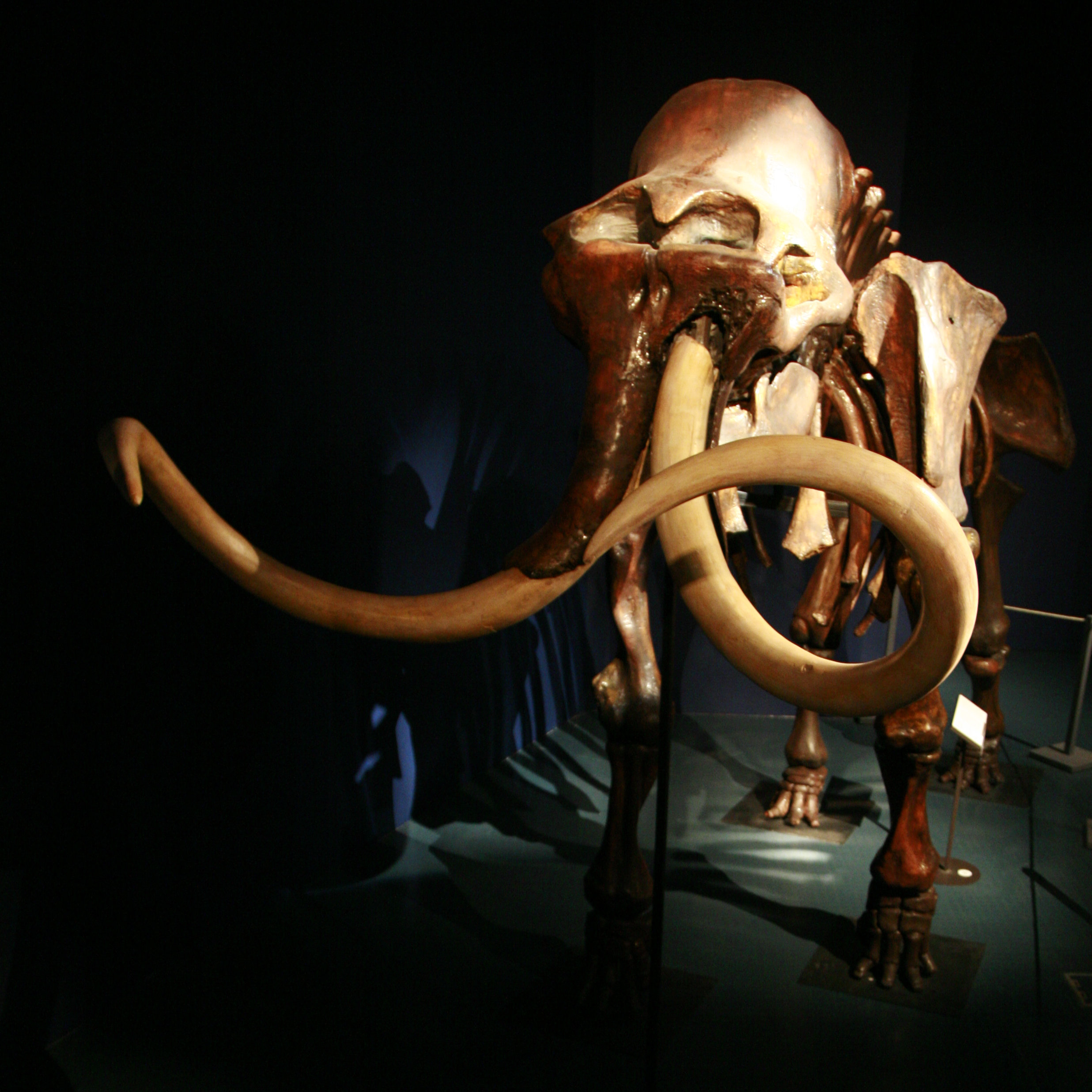
Woolly mammoth

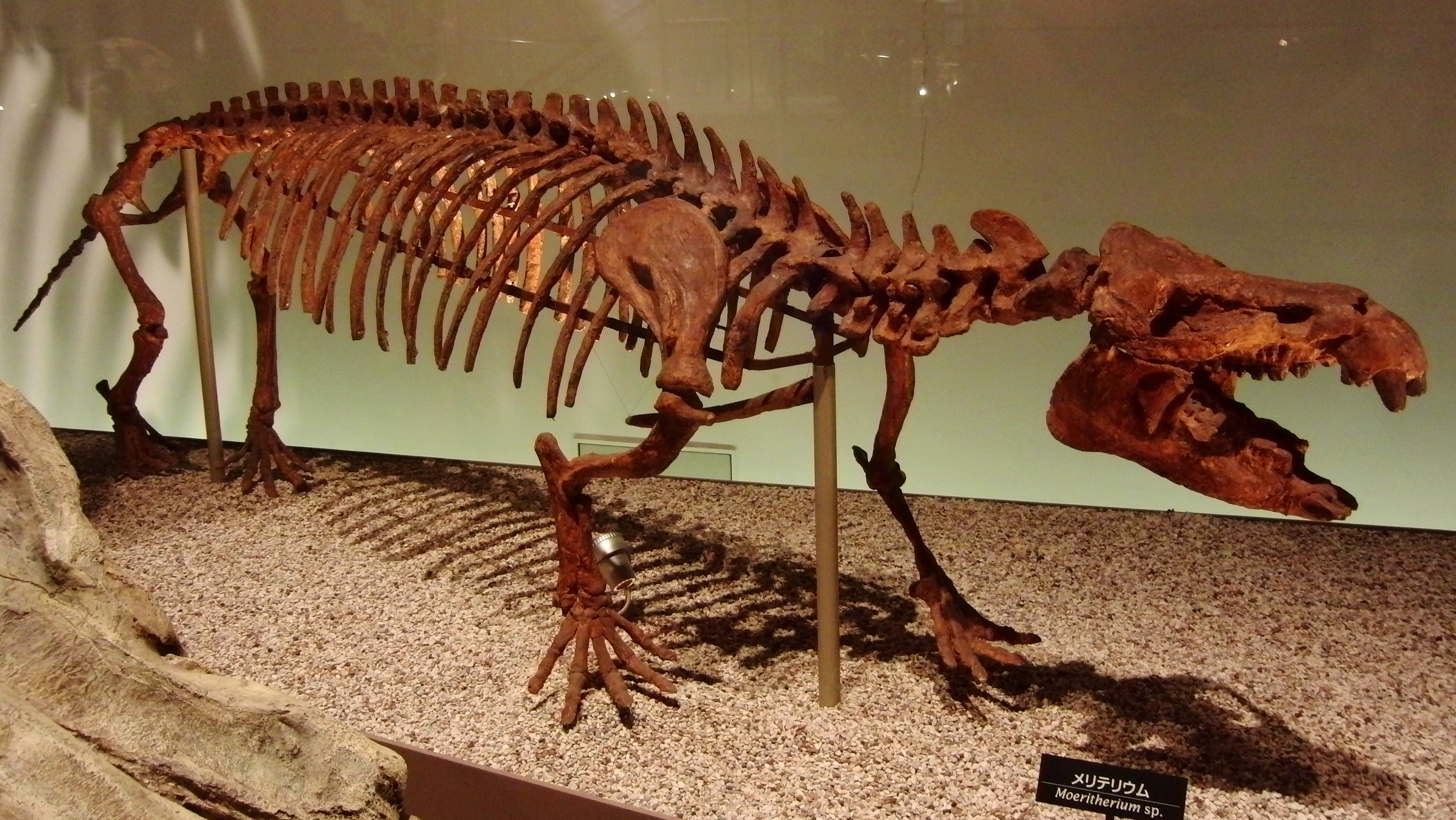
Moeritherium

Eocene–Holocene

- Genus †Daouitherium Gheerbrant & Sudre 2002
- Genus †Phosphatherium Gheerbrant, Sudre & Cappetta 1996
- Genus †Arcanotherium Delmer 2009
- Family †Moeritheriidae Andrews 1906
  - Genus †Moeritherium Andrews 1901
- Suborder †Barytherioidea Andrews 1906
  - Family †Numidotheriidae Shoshani & Tassy 1992
    - Genus †Numidotherium Jaeger 1986
  - Family †Barytheriidae Andrews 1906
    - Genus †Barytherium Andrews 1901 [Bradytherium Andrews 1901 non Grandidier 1901]
- Family †Deinotheriidae Bonaparte 1845 sensu Sanders, Kappelman & Rasmussen 2004
  - Subfamily †Chilgatheriinae Sanders, Kappelman & Rasmussen 2004
    - Genus †Chilgatherium Sanders, Kappelman & Rasmussen 2004
  - Subfamily †Deinotheriinae Bonaparte 1845 (Sanders, Kappelman & Rasmussen 2004 nom. transl. pro Deinotheriidae Bonaparte 1845)
    - Genus †Prodeinotherium Ehik 1930
    - Genus †Deinotherium Kaup 1829
- Suborder Elephantiformes Tassy 1988
  - Genus †Eritreum Shoshani et al. 2006
  - Family †Palaeomastodontidae Andrews 1906
    - Genus †Palaeomastodon Andrews 1901
  - Family †Phiomiidae Kalandadze & Rautian 1992
    - Genus †Phiomia Andrews & Beadnell 1902
  - Family †Hemimastodontidae McKenna et al. 1997
    - Genus †Hemimastodon Pilgrim 1912
  - Infraorder †Mammuthida Tassy & Shoshani 1997
    - Family †Mammutidae Hay 1922 non Cabrera 1929
      - Subfamily †Eozygodontinae McKenna, Bell & Shoshani 1997
        - Genus †Eozygodon Tassy & Pickford 1983
      - Subfamily †Mammutinae Hay 1922 [Mastodontinae Bonaparte 1845; Zyglophodontinae Osborn 1923]
        - Genus †Losodokodon Rasmussen & Gutiérrez 2009
        - Genus †Zygolophodon Vacek 1877 [Turicius Osborn 1926; Mastolophodon Chakravarti 1957]
        - Genus †Miomastodon Osborn, 1922
        - Genus †Mammut Blumenbach 1799 [Harpagmotherium Fischer De Waldheim 1808; Mastodon Rafinesque 1814; Mastotherium Fischer De Waldheim 1809; Mastodontum de Blainville 1817; Tetracaulodon Godman 1830; Missourium Koch 1840; Leviathan Koch 1841; Pliomastodon Osborn 1926]
  - Infraorder Elephantida Tassy & Shoshani 1997
    - Genus †"Konobelodon" atticus (Wagner 1857) Konidaris et al. 2014
    - Genus †"Bunolophodon" grandidens
    - Genus †Morrillia Osborn 1924
    - Genus †Paratetralophodon Tassy 1983
    - Family †Choerolophodontinae Gaziry 1976
      - Genus †Afrochoerodon Pickford 2001
      - Genus †Choerolophodon Schlessinger 1917[Synconolophus Osborn 1929]
    - Family †Amebelodontidae Barbour 1927 [Platybelodontinae Borissiak 1928; Protanancinae McKenna, Bell & Shoshani 1997]
      - Genus †Afromastodon Pickford 2003
      - Genus †Progomphotherium Pickford 2003
      - Genus †Archaeobelodon Tassy 1984
      - Genus †Serbelodon Frick 1933
      - Genus †Protanancus Arambourg 1945
      - Genus †Amebelodon Barbour 1927
      - Genus †Konobelodon Lambert 1990
      - Genus †Platybelodon Borissiak 1928 [Torynobelodon Barbour 1929; Selenolophodon Chang & Zhai 1978]
    - Family †Gomphotheriidae Hay 1922 sensu stricto [Trilophodontinae Simpson 1931; Longirostrinae Osborn 1918; Serridentinae Osborn 1921]
      - Genus †Gomphotherium Burmeister 1837 [Trilophodon Falconer & Cautley 1846; Bunolophodon Vacek 1877; Tetrabelodon Cope 1884; Megabelodon Barbour 1914; Genomastodon Barbour 1917; Serridentinus Osborn 1923; Ocalientinus Frick 1933; Trobelodon Frick 1933; Tatabelodon Frick 1933; Hemilophodon Kretzoi 1942; Kunatia Sarwar & Akhtar 1992]
    - Family †Gnathabelodontinae-Cuvieroniinae clade [Bunomastodontidae Osborn 1921]
      - Genus †Sinomastodon Tobien, Chen & Li 1986
      - Genus †Eubelodon Barbour 1914
      - Subfamily †Rhynchotheriinae Hay 1922 [Rhynchorostrinae Osborn 1918]
        - Genus †Rhynchotherium Falconer 1868 [Dibelodon Cope 1885; Blickotherium Frick 1933; Aybelodon Frick 1933]
      - Subfamily †Gnathabelodontinae Barbour & Sternberg 1835
        - Genus †Gnathabelodon Barbour & Sternberg 1935
      - Subfamily †Cuvieroniinae [Notorostrinae Osborn 1921; Humboltinae Osborn 1934; Brevirostrinae Osborn 1918; Notiomastodontinae Osborn 1936; Stegomastodontinae Osborn 1936]
        - Genus †Amahuacatherium Romero-Pittman 1996
        - Genus †Stegomastodon Pohlig 1912 [Rhabdobunus Ray 1914]
        - Genus †Haplomastodon Hoffstetter 1950 [Aleamastodon Hoffstetter 1952]
        - Genus †Notiomastodon Cabrera 1929
        - Genus †Cuvieronius Osborn 1923 [Mastodon; Cordillerion Osborn 1926; Teleobunomastodon Revilliod 1931]
    - Family Elephantidae Gray 1821 (modern elephants)
      - Genus †Stegodibelodon Coppens 1972
      - Subfamily †Stegolophodontinae Osborn 1936
        - Genus †Stegolophodon Schlesinger 1917 non Pohlig 1888 [Prostegodon Matsumoto 1923; Eostegodon Yabe 1950; Tetrazygodon Tobien 1978; Antelephas Sarwar 1979; Rulengchia Zhou & Zhang 1983]
      - Subfamily †Stegotetrabelodontinae Aguirre 1969
        - Genus †Stegotetrabelodon Patrocchi 1941
      - Subfamily †Stegodontinae Osborn 1918 [Cryptomastodontidae Von Koenigswals 1933]
        - Genus †Stegodon Falconer 1847 [Stegolophodon Pohlig 1888 non Schlesinger 1917; Emmenodon Cope 1889; Parastegodon Matsumoto 1929; Cryptomastodon von Koenigswald 1933; Platystegodon Deraniyagala 1954; Sulcicephalus Deraniyagala 1954]
      - Subfamily †Elephantinae Gray 1821 [Dicyclotheriinae Deraniyagala 1955] (modern elephants)
        - Genus †Primelephas Maglio 1970
        - Genus †Mammuthus Brookes 1828 [Dicyclotherium St. Hilare 1837; Cheirolites von Meyer 1848; Mammonteum De Blainville 1864; Archidiskodon Pohlig 1888; Parelephas Osborn 1925; Metarchidiskodon Osborn 1934] (mammuts)

==== Order †Leptictida ====
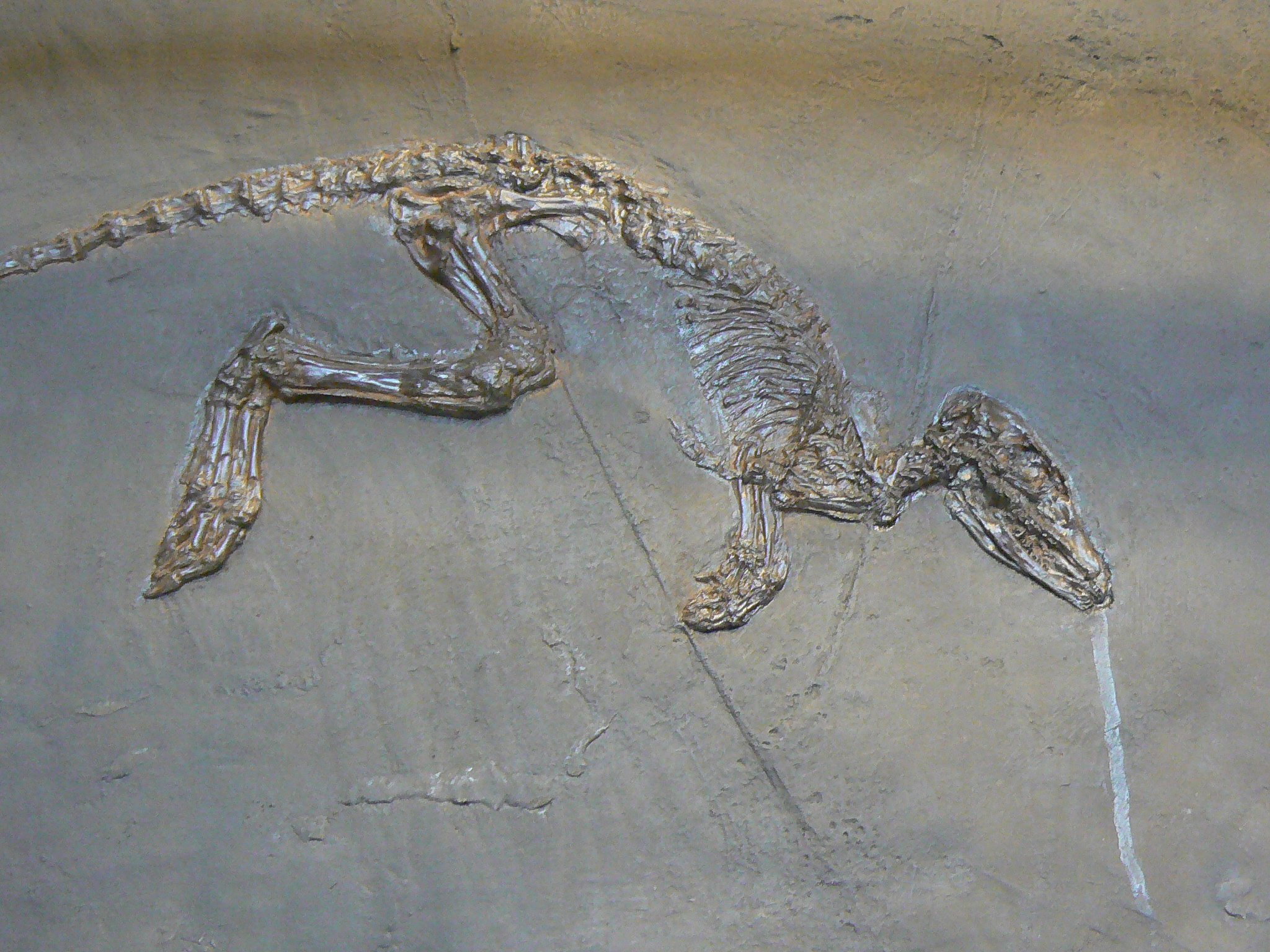
Leptictidium

- Family †Gypsonictopidae Van Valen 1967
  - Genus †Gypsonictops Simpson 1927 [Euangelistes Simpson 1929]
- Family †Didymoconidae Kretzoi 1943 [Tshelkariidae Gromova 1960]
  - Genus †Zeuctherium Tang & Yan 1976
  - Genus †Archaeoryctes Zheng 1979
  - Genus †Hunanictis Li et al. 1979
  - Genus †Kennatherium Mallett & Szalay 1968
  - Genus †Ardynictis Matthew & Granger 1925
  - Genus †Didymoconus Matthew & Granger 1924 [Tshelkaria Gromova 1960]
- Family †Leptictidae Gill 1872 [Isacidae Cope 1874; Ictopsidae Schlosser 1887; Ictopsida Haeckel 1895]
  - Subfamily †Pseudorhyncocyoninae Sigé 1974 [Pseudorhyncocyonidae Storch & Lister 1985]
    - Genus †Diaphyodectes Russell 1964
    - Genus †Phakodon Hooker 2013
    - Genus †Pseudorhyncocyon Filhol 1892
    - Genus †Leptictidium Tobien 1962
  - Subfamily †Leptictinae Gill 1872 non Van Valen 1967 [Diacodontinae Trouessart 1879]
    - Genus †Amphigyion Gingerich & Smith 2006
    - Genus †Megaleptictis Meehan & Martin 2012
    - Genus †Myrmecoboides Gidley 1915
    - Genus †Ongghonia Kellner & McKenna 1996
    - Genus †Blacktops Meehan & Martin 2010
    - Genus †Ictopidium Zdansky 1930 [?Erinaceidae: Tupaiodontinae Butler 1988]
    - Genus †Xenacodon Matthew & Granger 1921
    - Genus †Protictops Peterson 1934 [?Geolabididae]
    - Genus †Leptictis Leidy 1868 [Isacus Cope 1873 non Isaca Walker 1857; Mesodectes Cope 1875; Ictops Leidy 1868; Nanohyus Leidy 1869; Ictidops Weber 1904]
    - Genus †Prodiacodon Matthew 1929 [Palaeolestes Matthew 1918 non De Vis 1911]
    - Genus †Palaeictops Matthew 1899 [Parictops Granger 1910; Hypictops Gazin 1949]

==== Order †Cimolesta ====
- Family †Wyolestidae Gingerich 1981
  - Genus †Wyolestes Gingerich 1981
  - Genus †Hsiangolestes Zheng & Huang 1984
  - Genus †Mongoloryctes Van Valen 1966
- Family †Palaeoryctidae Winge 1917
  - Genus †Ottoryctes Bloch, Secord & Gingerich 2004
  - Genus †Aaptoryctes Gingerich 1982
  - Genus †Aceroryctes Rankin & Holroyd 2014
  - Genus †Aboletylestes Russell 1964 [?cimolestid; Didelphodonta]
  - Genus †Eoryctes Thewissen & Gingerich 1989 non Romer 1966 (nomen nudum)
  - Genus †Lainoryctes Fox 2004
  - Genus †Leptonysson Van Valen 1967 [a leptictid or a pantolestid?]
  - Genus †Naranius Russell & Dashzeveg 1986
  - Genus †Tsaganius Russell & Dashzeveg 1986 [?Didelphodonta]
  - Genus †Palaeoryctes Matthew 1913
  - Genus †Pararyctes Van Valen 1966
- Suborder †Ernodonta Ding 1987
  - Family †Ernanodontidae Ding 1979
    - Genus †Asiabradypus Nesov 1987
    - Genus †Ernanodon Ding 1979
- Suborder †Apatotheria Scott & Jepsen 1936
  - Family †Apatemyidae Matthew 1909
    - Subfamily †Unuchiinae Van Valen 1966
      - Genus †Unuchinia Simpson 1937 [Apator Simpson 1937 non Semenow 1898]
    - Subfamily †Apatemyinae Matthew 1909
      - Genus †Carcinella Von Koenigswald et al. 2009
      - Genus †Eochiromys Teilhard de Chardin 1927
      - Genus †Frugivastodon Bajpai et al. 2005
      - Genus †Heterohyus Gervais 1848 [Necrosorex Filhol 1890; Heterochiromys Stehlin 1916; Amphichiromys Stehlin 1916; Gardomys Sigé 1975; Chardinyus Sigé 1975; Gervaisyus Sigé 1990]
      - Genus †Sinclairella Jepsen 1934
      - Genus †Jepsenella Simpson 1940
      - Genus †Labidolemur Matthew & Granger 1921
      - Genus †Apatemys Marsh 1872 [Stehlinius Matthew 1921]
- Suborder †Taeniodonta Cope 1876
  - Family †StylinodontidaeMarsh 1875a
    - Genus †Chungchienia Chow 1963 [? tillodont by McKenna & Bell 1997]
    - Genus †Alveugena Eberle 1999 sensu Alroy 2002
    - Genus †Onychodectes Coep 1888
    - Subfamily †Conoryctinae Wortman 1896
      - Genus †Conoryctella Gazin 1939
      - Genus †Huerfanodon Schoch & Lucas 1981b
      - Genus †Conoryctes Cope 1881 [Hexodon Cope 1884 non Olivier 1789]
    - Subfamily †Stylinodontinae Schlosser 1911
      - Genus †Schowalteria Fox & Naylor 2003
      - Genus †Schochia Lucas & Williamson 1993
      - Genus †Wortmania Hay 1899
      - Genus †Psittacotherium Cope 1882 [Hemiganus Cope 1882 non Hemicanus Wortman 1897]
      - Genus †Ectoganus Cope 1874 [Camalodon Cope 1874; Dryptodon Marsh 1876; Conicodon Cope 1894; Lampadophorus Patterson 1949]
      - Genus †Stylinodon Marsh 1874b
- Suborder †Tillodontia Marsh 1875
  - Family †Tillotheriidae Marsh 1875 [Esthonychidae]
    - Subfamily †Deltatheriinae Van Valen 1988 [?Leptictidae]
      - Genus †Deltatherium Cope 1881 [Lipodectes Cope 1881]
    - Subfamily †Tillotheriinae Marsh 1875 [Plethorodontidae Huang & Zheng 1987]
      - Genus †Anchilestes Chiu & Li 1977 [? anagalid]
      - Genus †Basalina Dehm & Oettingen-Spielberg 1958
      - Genus †Benaius Wang & Jin 2004
      - Genus †Franchaius Baudry 1992
      - Genus †Higotherium Miyata & Tomida 1998
      - Genus †Kuanchuanius Chow 1963
      - Genus †Simplodon Huang & Zheng 2003
      - Genus †Interogale Huang & Zheng 1983 [?Anagalida]
      - Genus †Plethorodon Huang & Zheng 1987
      - Genus †Yuesthonyx Tong, Wang & Fu 2003
      - Genus †Lofochaius Chow et al. 1973
      - Genus †Meiostylodon Wang 1975
      - Tribe †Esthonychini [Trogosinae]
        - Genus †Adapidium Young 1937
        - Genus †Anthraconyx Rose et al. 2012
        - Genus †Megalesthonyx Rose 1972
        - Genus †Esthonyx Cope 1874 [Plesiesthonyx Lemoine 1891; Azygonyx Gingerich 1989]
        - Genus †Tillodon Gazin 1953 [Tillotherium Marsh 1875]
        - Genus †Trogosus Leidy 1871b [Anchippodus Leidy 1868 (nomen nudum)]
- Suborder †Pantodonta Cope 1873
  - Genus †Huananius Huang & Zheng 1999
  - Family †Wangliidae Van Valen 1988 [Alcidedorbignyidae de Muizon & Marshall 1992]
    - Genus †Alcidedorbignya de Muizon & Marshall 1987
    - Genus †Wanglia Van Valen 1988 [Harpyodus de Muizon & Marshall 1992]
  - Superfamily †Bemalambdoidea Zhou, Zhang, Wang & Ding 1973
    - Family †Bemalambdidae Zhou et al. 1973
      - Genus †Bemalambda Zhou et al. Ding 1973
      - Genus †Hypsilolambda Wang 1975
    - Family †Harpyodidae Wang 1979
      - Genus †Harpyodus Qiu & Li 1977
      - Genus †Dysnoetodon Zhang 1980 [?Tillotheriinae]
  - Superfamily †Coryphodontoidea Marsh 1876
    - Family †Coryphodontidae Marsh 1876
      - Genus †Asiocoryphodon Xu 1976
      - Genus †Coryphodon Owen 1845 [Bathmodon Cope 1872; Metalophodon Cope 1872; Ectacodon Cope 1882; Manteodon Cope 1882; Letalophodon; Loxolophodon Cope 1872]
      - Genus †Heterocoryphodon Lucas & Tong 1987
      - Genus †Eudinoceras Osborn 1924
      - Genus †Hypercoryphodon Osborn & Granger 1932
      - Genus †Metacoryphodon Zhou & Qi 1982 non Qi 1987
      - Genus †Procoryphodon Flerow 1957
  - Superfamily †Pantolambdoidea Cope 1883
    - Family †Cyriacotheriidae Rose & Krause 1982
      - Genus †Cyriacotherium Rose & Krause 1982 [Sabatherium McKenna 1972]
      - Genus †Presbytherium Scott 2010
    - Family †Pastoralodontidae Chow & Qi 1978
      - Genus †Altilambda Chow & Wang 1978
      - Genus †Pastoralodon Chow & Qi 1978 [Convallisodon Chow & Qi 1978]
    - Family †Titanoideidae Patterson 1934
      - Genus †Titanoides Gidley 1917 [Sparactolambda Patterson 1939]
    - Family †Barylambdidae Patterson 1937
      - Genus †Barylambda Patterson 1937 [Leptolambda Patterson & Simons 1958 sensu McKenna & Bell 1997]
      - Genus †Haplolambda Patterson 1939 [Ignatiolambda Simons 1960]
    - Family †Pantolambdidae Cope 1883
      - Genus †Caenolambda Gazin 1956
      - Genus †Guilielmofloweria Ameghino 1901
      - Genus †Lopholambda Ameghino 1904
      - Genus †Pantolambda Cope 1882
    - Family †Pantolambdodontidae Granger & Gregory 1934 [Archaeolambdidae Flerov 1952]
      - Genus †Archaeolambda Flerov 1952 [Dilambda Tong 1978; Oroklambda Dashzeveg 1980]
      - Genus †Guichilambda Huang & Chen 1997
      - Genus †Nanlingilambda Tong 1979
      - Genus †Pantolambdodon Granger & Gregory 1934
- Suborder †Pantolesta McKenna 1975
  - Genus †Premontrelestes Smith 2001
  - Genus †Simidectes Stock 1933 [Pleurocyon Peterson 1919 non Mercerat 1917; Sespecyon Stock 1933 (nomen nudum); Petersonella Kraglievich 1948 (nomen novii)]
  - Family †Paroxyclaenidae Weintzel 1933
    - Genus †Dulcidon van Valen 1965 [a dichobunid??]
    - Subfamily †Merialinae Russell & Godinot 1988
      - Genus †Merialus Russell & Godinot 1988
      - Genus †Euhookeria Russell & Godinot 1988
    - Subfamily †Paroxyclaeninae Weitzel 1933
      - Genus †Kiinkerishella Gabunia & Birjukov 1978
      - Genus †Paroxyclaenus Teilhard de Chardin 1922
      - Genus †Spaniella Crusafont Pairó & Russell 1967
      - Genus †Vulpavoides Matthes 1952 [Pugiodens Matthes 1952; Russellites Van Valen 1965]
      - Genus †Kopidodon Weitzel 1933
  - Family †Pantolestidae Cope 1884 [Dyspternidae Kretzoi 1943]
    - Genus †Aatotomus Rankin 2014
    - Subfamily †Pentacodontinae Simpson 1937
      - Genus †Aphronorus Simpson 1935
      - Genus †Bisonalveus Gazin 1956
      - Genus †Coriphagus Douglass 1908 [Mixoclaenus Matthew & Granger 1921]
      - Genus †Pantomimus Van Valen 1967
      - Genus †Pentacodon Scott 1892
      - Genus †Protentomodon Simpson 1928a [?palaeoryctid; Didelphodontia]
      - Genus †Amaramnis Gazin 1962
    - Subfamily †Dyspterninae Kretzoi 1943 [Kochictidae Kretzoi 1943]
      - Genus †Fordonia Marandat 1989 non Gray 1842
      - Genus †Cryptopithecus Schlosser 1890 [Opsiclaenodon Butler 1946; Androconus Quinet 1965]
      - Genus †Dyspterna Hopwood 1927
      - Genus †Kochictis Kretzoi 1943
      - Genus †Gobiopithecus Dashzeveg & Russell 1992
    - Subfamily †Todralestinae Gheerbrant 1991
      - Genus †Todralestes Gheerbrant 1991
      - Genus †Namalestes Pickford et al. 2008
    - Subfamily †Pantolestinae Cope 1884 [Cymaprimadontidae Clark 1968]
      - Genus †Nosella Pelaez-Campomanes 1999
      - Genus †Propalaeosinopa Simpson 1927 nomen dubium
      - Genus †Bessoecetor Simpson 1936 sensu Scott, Fox & Youzwyshyn 2002
      - Genus †Palaeosinopa Matthew 1901 [Niphredil van Valen 1978]
      - Genus †Thelysia Gingerich 1982
      - Genus †Pagonomus Russell 1964
      - Genus †Pantolestes Cope 1872b [Passalacodon Marsh 1872; Anisacodon Marsh 1872]
      - Genus †Bogdia Dashzeveg & Russell 1985
      - Genus †Chadronia Cook 1954 [Cymaprimadon Clark 1968]
      - Genus †Buxolestes Jaeger 1970
      - Genus †Bouffinomus Mathis 1989
      - Genus †Galethylax Gervais 1850
      - Genus †Oboia Gabunia 1989 [? merialine paroxyclaenid]
      - Genus †Zhigdenia Lopatin 2006

==== Order Eulipotyphla ====
Late Cretaceous–Recent

- Family †Micropternodontidae sensu McKenna & Bell 1997
- Family †Diacodontinae
- Family †Creotarsidae
- Family †Sespedectidae
- Family †Amphilemuridae Hill 1953
- Family †Adapisoricidae
- Superfamily Erinaceoidea
  - Family Erinaceidae Fischer de Waldheim 1817
- Superfamily Talpoidea
  - Genus †Hesperoscalops Hibbard 1941
  - Family †Proscalopidae Reed 1961
  - Family †Dimylidae
  - Family Talpidae Fischer von Waldheim 1817
- Family †Geolabididae
- Superfamily Soricoidea
  - Family †Apternodontidae
  - Family †Oligoryctidae Asher et al. 2002
  - Family †Parapternodontidae Asher et al. 2002
  - Family †Nyctitheriidae Simpson 1928a
  - Family Soricidae Fischer von Waldheim 1817
    - Genus †Dolinasorex Rofes & Cuence-Bescós, 2008
      - Species †Dolinasorex glyphodon Rofes & Cuence-Bescós, 2008
    - Genus Notiosorex Coues 1877
      - Species †Notiosorex harrisi Carroway 2010

==== Order Dermoptera ====
Paleocene–Recent

- Family †Thylacaelurinae Van Valen 1967
  - Genus †Thylacaelurus Russell 1954
- Family †Plagiomenidae Matthew 1918
  - Genus †Eudaemonema Simpson 1935
  - Genus †Elpidophorus Simpson 1927
  - Subfamily †Plagiomeninae Matthew & Granger 1918
    - Tribe †Worlandiini Bown & Rose 1979
      - Genus †Planetetherium Simpson 1928
      - Genus †Worlandia Bown & Rose 1979
    - Tribe †Plagiomenini
      - Genus †Ellesmene Dawson et al. 1993
      - Genus †Plagiomene Matthew 1918
- Family †Mixodectidae Cope 1883 [Oldobotidae Schlosser 1907]
  - Genus †Dracontolestes Gazin 1941
  - Genus †Mixodectes Cope 1883 [Indrodon Cope 1884; Olbodotes Osborn 1902]
- Family Cynocephalidae Simpson 1945 [Colugidae Miller 1906; Galeopithecidae Gray 1821; Galeopteridae Thomas 1908; Pleuropteridae Burnett 1829; Pterocebineae Lesson 1840]
  - Genus †Progaleopithecus Ameghino 1904
  - Genus †Dermotherium Durcrocq et al. 1992
  - Genus †Cynocephalus Boddaert 1768 non St. Hilaire & Cuvier 1795 non Swainson 1835 [Colugo Gray 1870; Dermopterus Burnett 1829; Galeolemur Lesson 1840; Galeopithecus Pallas 1783; Galeopus Rafinesque 1815; Pleuropterus Burnett 1829] (Philippine flying lemur)
  - Genus †Galeopterus Thomas 1908 (Cobego, Sunda/Malayan Flying Lemur)

==== Order Chiroptera ====
Eocene–Recent

- Genus †Australonycteris Hand et al. 1994
- Family †Onychonycteridae
- Family †Icaronycteridae Jepsen 1966
- Family †Archaeonycteridae Revilliod 1917
- Family †Hassianycterididae Habersetzer & Storch 1987
- Family †Tanzanycterididae
- Family †Palaeochiropterygidae Revilliod 1917
- Family Pteropodidae Gray 1821 [Cephalotidae Gray 1821] (Old World fruit bats, flying foxes)
- Family Megadermatidae Allen 1864 (Asian false vampire bats)
- Family Rhinopomatidae Bonaparte 1838 (mouse-tailed/long-tailed bats)
- Family Rhinolophidae Gray 1825 [Hipposideridae] (horseshoe bats)
- Family Phyllostomatidae Gray 1825 [Desmodontidae] (American leaf-nosed bats)
- Family Mystacinidae Dobson 1875 (New Zealand short-tailed bats)
- Family †Philisidae Sige 1985
- Family Molossidae Gray 1821 (free-tailed bats & mastiff bats)
- Family Emballonuridae Gervais 1855 (Sac-winged bats, sheath-tailed & ghost bats)
- Family Myzopodidae Thomas 1904
- Family Natalidae Gray 1866 (funnel-eared/tall-crowned/graceful bats)
- Family Vespertilionidae Gray 1821

==== Order Scandentia ====
- Genus †Nycticonodon Quinet 1964
- Family Tupaiidae Gray 1825 (tree shrews)
  - Subfamily Tupaiinae Gray 1825 [Cladobatina Bonaparte 1838; Glisoricina Pomel 1848] (true tree shrews)
    - Genus †Palaeotupaia Chopra & Vasishat 1979
    - Genus †Eodendrogale Yongsheng 1988 non Tong 1988
    - Genus †Prodendrogale Qiu 1986

==== Order †Plesiadapiformes ====
- Genus †Pandemonium Van Valen 1994
- Family †Palaechthonidae Szalay 1969
  - Genus †Palaechthon Gidley 1923
- Family †Purgatoriidae (Van Valen & Sloan 1965) Gunnell 1981
  - Genus †Ursolestes Fox, Scott & Buckley 2014
  - Genus †Purgatorius Van Valen & Sloan 1965
- Family †Palaechthonidae van Valen 1995
  - Genus †Anasazia Van Valen 1994
  - Subfamily †Palenochthina
    - Genus †Premnoides Gunnell 1989
    - Genus †Palenochtha Simpson 1935
  - Subfamily †Plesiolestinae Gunnell 1989
    - Genus †Phoxomylus Fox 2011
    - Genus †Plesiolestes Jepsen 1930 [Talpohenach Kay & Cartmill 1977]
    - Genus †Torrejonia Gazin 1968
- Family †Micromomyidae Szalay 1974
  - Genus †Dryomomys Bloch et al. 2007
  - Subfamily †Tinimomyinae Beard & Houde 1989 sensu McKenna & Bell 1997
    - Genus †Tinimomys Szalay 1974 [Myrmekomomys Robinson 1994]
  - Subfamily †Micromomyinae
    - Genus †Chalicomomys Beard & Houde 1989
    - Genus †Micromomys Szalay 1973
- Family †Picrodontidae Simpson 1937
  - Genus †Draconodus Tomida 1982
  - Genus †Zanycteris Matthew 1917
  - Genus †Picrodus Douglass 1908 [Megapterna Douglass 1908]
- Family †Picromomyidae Rose & Bown 1996
  - Genus †Picromomys Rose & Bown 1996
  - Genus †Alveojunctus Bown 1982
- Family †Toliapinidae Hooker, Russell & Phélizon 1999
  - Genus †Seia Russell & Gingerich 1981 [formerly an erinaceomorph insectivoran]
  - Genus †Berruvius Russell 1964 [?navajoviine sensu McKenna & Bell 1997]
  - Genus †Sarnacius Hooker, Russell & Phélizon 1999
  - Genus †Altiatlasius Sigé et al. 1990 [formerly an omomyid primate]
  - Genus †Avenius Russell, Phélizon & Louis 1992
  - Genus †Toliapina Hooker, Russell & Phélizon 1999
- Family †Microsyopidae Osborn & Wortman 1892
  - Subfamily †Microsyopinae (Osborn & Wortman 1892) Matthew 1915
    - Genus †Arctodontomys Gunnell 1985
    - Genus †Megadelphus Gunnell 1989
    - Genus †Craseops Stock 1932
    - Genus †Microsyops Leidy 1872 [Bathrodon Marsh 1872; Mesacodon Marsh 1872; Palaeacodon Leidy 1872; Cynodontomys Cope 1882]
  - Subfamily †Uintasoricinae Szalay 1969 [Navajoviinae Gunnell 1989]
    - Genus †Choctawius Beard & Dawson 2009
    - Tribe †Navajoviini Szalay & Delson 1979
      - Genus †Navajovius Matthew & Granger 1921
    - Tribe †Uintasoricini Szalay 1969
      - Genus †Niptomomys McKenna 1960
      - Genus †Nanomomys Rose et al. 2012
      - Genus †Bartelsia Gunnell 2012
      - Genus †Uintasorex Matthew 1909b
- Family †Paromomyidae Simpson 1940
  - Genus †Edworthia Fox, Scott & Rankin 2010
  - Genus †Paromomys Gidley 1923 {Paromomyinae}
  - Genus †Acidomomys Bloch et al. 2002
  - Subfamily †Phenacolemurinae Simpson 1955 [Simpsonlemurini Robinson & Ivy 1994; Phenacolemurini Simpson 1955]
    - Genus †Pulverflumen Robinson & Ivy 1994
    - Genus †Simpsonlemur Robinson & Ivy 1994
    - Genus †Dillerlemur Robinson & Ivy 1994
    - Genus †Ignacius Matthew & Granger 1921
    - Genus †Phenacolemur Matthew 1915
    - Genus †Elwynella Rose & Bown 1982
    - Genus †Arcius Godinot 1984
- Family †Chronolestidae
  - Genus †Chronolestes Beard & Wang 1995
- Family Plesiadapidae
  - Genus †Jattadectes Thewissen, Williams & Hussain 2001
  - Subfamily †Saxonellinae Russell 1964 sensu McKenna & Bell 1997 [Saxonellidae Russell 1964]
    - Genus †Saxonella Russell 1964
  - Subfamily †Plesiadapinae Troussart 1897
    - Genus †Megachiromyoides Weigelt 1933
    - Genus †Pronothodectes Gidley 1923
    - Genus †Nannodectes Gingerich 1975
    - Genus †Chiromyoides Stehlin 1916
    - Genus †Platychoerops Charlesworth 1855 [Miolophus Owen 1865; Subunicuspidens Lemoine 1887]
    - Genus †Plesiadapis Gervais 1877 sensu stricto non Russell 1964/Jepsen 1930 [Tricuspidens Lemoine 1887; Nothodectes Matthew 1915; Menatotherium Piton 1940; Ancepsoides Russell 1964]
- Family Carpolestidae Simpson 1935
  - Genus †Parvocristes Thewissen, Williams & Hussain 2001
  - Genus †Subengius Smith, VanItterbeeck & Missiaen 2004
  - Subfamily †Carpolestinae Simpson 1935
    - Genus †Elphidotarsius Gidley 1923
    - Genus †Carpocristes Beard & Wang 1995
    - Genus †Carpodaptes Matthew & Granger 1921
    - Genus †Carpolestes Simpson 1928 sensu lato [Litotherium Simpson 1929; Carpomegodon Bloch et al. 2001]

==== Order Primates ====
List of fossil primates

==== Order †Anagalida ====
- Genus †Wania Wang 1995
- Family †Pseudictopidae Sulimski 1969 [Mingotheriidae Schoch 1985]
  - Genus †Anictops Qiu 1977
  - Genus †Cartictops Ding & Tong 1979
  - Genus †Paranictops Qiu 1977
  - Genus †Allictops Qiu 1977
  - Genus †Pseudictops Matthew, Granger & Simpson 1929
  - Genus †Mingotherium Schoch 1985 [Uintatheriamorpha?]
  - Genus †Halticotops Ding & Tong 1979
- Family †Anagalidae Simpson 1931 [Peritupaioidea Crusafont Pairó 1966]
  - Genus †Linnania Chow et al. 1973
  - Genus †Diacronus Xu 1976
  - Genus †Huaiyangale Xu 1976
  - Genus †Palasiodon Tong et al. 1976 [?Mioclaeninae; Hyopsodontinae]
  - Genus †Eosigale Hu 1993
  - Genus †Wanogale Xu 1976
  - Genus †Anaptogale Xu 1976
  - Genus †Stenanagale Wang 1975
  - Genus †Chianshania Xu 1976
  - Genus †Qipania Hu 1993
  - Genus †Hsiuannania Xu 1976
  - Genus †Anagalopsis Bohlin 1951
  - Genus †Anagale Simpson 1931
  - Genus †Kashanagale Szalay & McKenna 1971
  - Genus †Wangogale

==== Order Lagomorpha ====
Eocene–Recent

- Genus †Gomphos Shevyreva 1975
- Genus †Hypsimylus Zhai 1977
- Genus †Anatolimylus Shevyre 1994
- Genus †Dawsonolagus Li, Meng & Wang 2007
- Genus †Ephemerolagus Vianey-Liaud & Lebrun 2013
- Genus †Erenlagus Fostowicz-Frelik & Li 2014
- Genus †Lushilagus Li 1965
- Family †Mimotonidae Li 1978
  - Genus †Mimotona Li 1977
- Family †Mimolagidae Erbajeva 1986
  - Genus †Mimolagus Bohlin 1951
- Family †Prolagidae Gureev 1962
  - Genus †Prolagus Pomel 1853 [Myolagus Hensel 1856; Anoema Koenig 1825; Archaeomys Fraas 1856]
- Family Ochotonidae Thomas 1897 [Lagomyidae Lilljeborg 1866; Amphilagidae Gureev 1953; Prolagidae Gureev 1960; Ochotonida Averianov 1999] (pikas; mouse hares, conies)
  - Genus †Plicalagus Wu et al. 1998
  - Genus †Pseudobellatona Topachevs, Nes & Topachevs 1993
  - Genus †Desmatolagus Matthew & Granger 1927 [Agispelagus Argyropulo 1939; Bohlinotona de Muizon 1977; Procaprolagus Gureev 1960]
  - Genus †Sinolagomys Bohlin 1937 [Ochotonolagus Gureev 1960]
  - Genus †Piezodus Viret 1929
  - Genus †Amphilagus Pomel 1853
  - Genus †Austrolagomys Stromer 1926
  - Genus †Marcuinomys Lavocat 1951
  - Genus †Ptychoprolagus Tobien 1975
  - Genus †Heterolagus Crusafont Pairo, Villalta & Truyols 1955
  - Genus †Lagopsis Schlosser 1894 non Rafinesque 1815 nomen nudum [Opsolagus Kretzoi 1941]
  - Genus †Titanomys von Meyer 1843 [Platyodon Bravard 1853 non Conrad 1837]
  - Genus †Kenyalagomys MacInnes 1957
  - Genus †Oreolagus Dice 1917
  - Genus †Cuyamalagus Hutchison & Lindsay 1974
  - Genus †Oklaholmalagus Dalquest, Baskin & Schultz 1996
  - Genus †Albertona Lopez-Martinez 1986
  - Genus †Bellatona Dawson 1961
  - Genus †Russellagus Storer 1970
  - Genus †Gymnesicolagus Mein & Adrover 1982
  - Genus †Hesperolagomys Clark, Dawson & Wood 1964
  - Genus †Alloptox Dawson 1961 [Metochotona Kretzoi 1941]
  - Genus †Ochotonoides Teilhard de Jardin & Young 1931 [Prolagomys Erbajeva 1975]
  - Genus †Ochotonoma Sen 1998
  - Genus †Paludotona Dawson 1959
  - Genus †Pliolagomys Agadjanian & Erbajeva 1983
- Family Leporidae Fischer de Waldheim 1817 non Gray 1821 [Leporida Averianov 1999] (rabbits & hares)
  - Genus †Coelogenys Illiger 1811
  - Genus †Shamolagus Burke 1941
  - Genus †Tsaganolagus Li 1978
  - Genus †Gobiolagus Burke 1941
  - Genus †Strenulagus Tong & Lei 1987
  - Genus †Ordolagus de Muizon 1977
  - Genus †Litolagus Dawson 1958
  - Genus †Gripholagomys Green 1972
  - Genus †Lepoides White 1988
  - Genus †Valerilagus Shevyreva 1995
  - Genus †Zaissanolagus Erbajeva 1999
  - Genus †Trituberolagus Tong 1997
  - Genus †Romanolagus Shevyreva 1995
  - Genus †Annalagus Shevyreva 1996 (nomen dubium)
  - Subfamily †Archaeolaginae Dice 1929
    - Genus †Panolax Cope 1874
    - Genus †Pewelagus White 1984
    - Genus †Notolagus Wilson 1938
    - Genus †Archaeolagus Dice 1917
    - Genus †Hypolagus Dice 1917 [Lagotherium Pictet 1853; Pliolagus Kormos 1934]
  - Subfamily Palaeolaginae Dice 1929 [Mytonilagidae Burke 1941] ()
    - Genus †Chadrolagus Gawne 1978
    - Genus †Limitolagus Fostowicz-Frelik 2013
    - Genus †Megalagus Walker 1931 sensu McKenna & Bell 1996 [Tachylagus Storer 1992; Montanolagus Gureev 1964]
    - Genus †Serengetilagus Dietrich 1941
    - Genus †Mytonolagus Burke 1934
    - Genus †Palaeolagus Leidy 1856
    - Genus †Pliopentalagus Gureev & Konkova 1964
    - Genus †Pliosiwalagus Patnaik 2001
  - Subfamily Leporinae (Gray 1821) Trouessart 1880
    - Genus †Nuralagus Quintana, Köhler & Moyà-Solà 2011 (Minorcan giant lagomorph)
    - Genus †Trischizolagus Radulesco & Samson 1967 [Hispanolagus Janvier & Montenat 1971]
    - Genus †Pronotolagus White 1991
    - Genus †Paranotolagus Miller & Carranza-Castañeda 1982
    - Genus †Alilepus Dice 1931
    - Genus †Pratilepus Hibbard 1934
    - Genus †Aluralagus Downey 1968
    - Genus †Aztlanolagus Russell & Harris 1986
    - Genus †Nekrolagus [Pediolagus Hibbard 1939 non Marelli 1927]

==== Order Rodentia ====
Paleocene–Recent

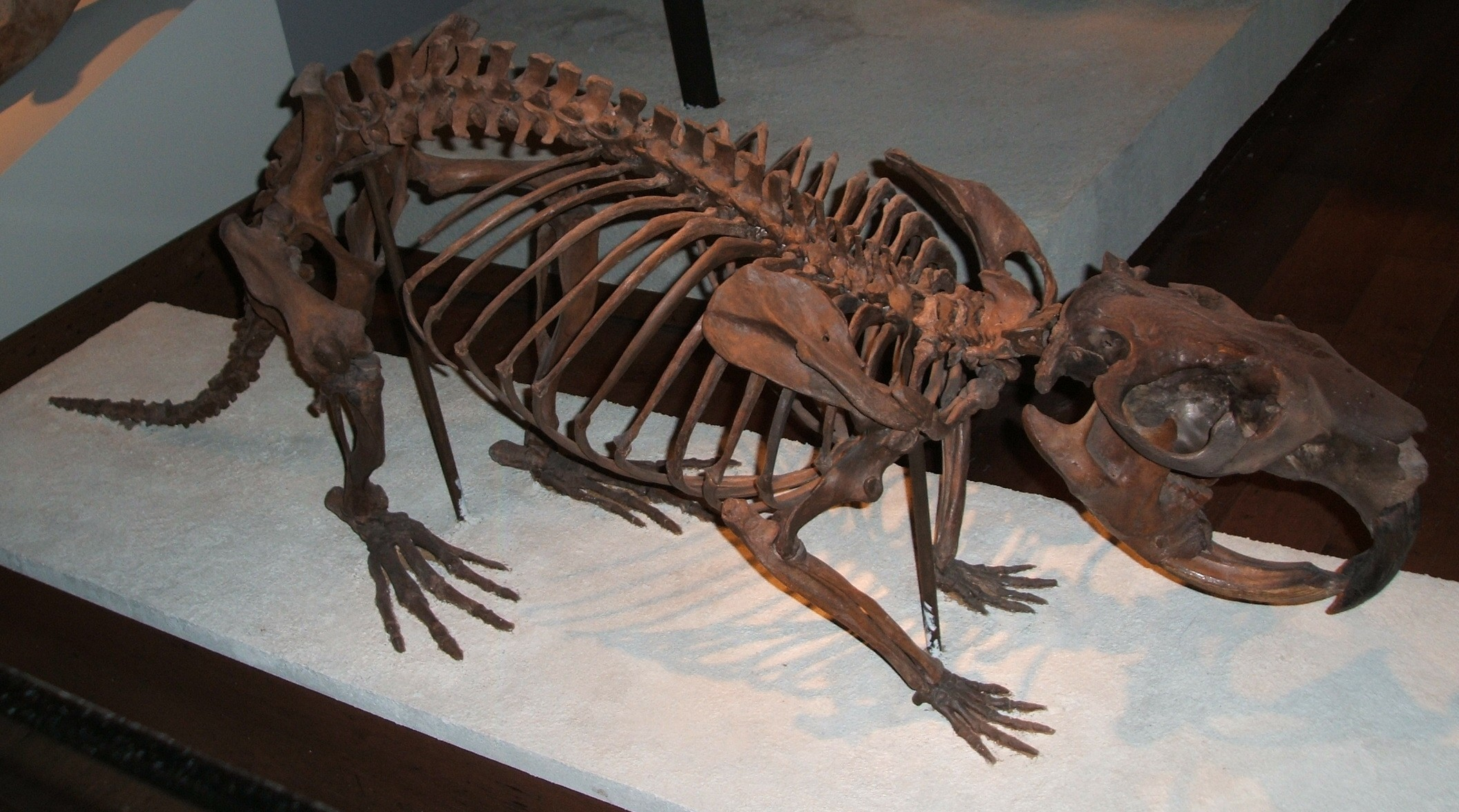
Giant beaver

- Family †Eurymylidae Dashzeveg & Russell 1988 [Rhombomylidae Li et al. 1987]
- Family †Laredomyidae Wilson & Westgate 1991
- Family †Cocomyinae de Bruijn, Hussain & Leinders 1982
- Family †Ivanantoniidae Shevyreva 1989
- Family †Alagomyidae
- Family †Paramyidae
- Family †Cylindrodontidae Miller & Gidley 1918
- Family †Sciuravidae Miller & Gidley 1918
- Family †Zegdoumyidae Vianey-Liaud et al. 1994
- Suborder Sciuromorpha Brandt 1855
  - Family †Ischyromyidae Alston 1876
  - Family †Microparamyinae Wood 1962
  - Family †Theridomyidae Alston 1876
  - Family †Allomyidae Marsh 1877
  - Family †Mylagaulidae Cope 1881
  - Family †Reithroparamyidae Wood 1962
- Suborder Ctenodactylomorpha
  - Family †Laonastidae Jenkins et al. 2005
- Suborder Hystricomorpha
  - Family †Diatomyidae Mein & Ginsburg 1997
  - Family †Chapattimyinae Hussain, de Bruijn & Leinders 1978
  - Family †Tsaganomyidae Matthew & Granger 1923
  - Family †Baluchimyinae Flynn et al. 1986
  - Family †Diamantomyidae Schaub 1958
  - Family †Myophiomyidae Lavocat 1973
  - Family †Phiomyidae Wood 1955
  - Family †Kenyamyidae Lavocat 1973
  - Family †Bathyergoididae Lavocat 1973
  - Family †Heptaxodontidae Anthony 1917
  - Family †Neoepiblemidae Kraglievich 1926 [Perimyidae Landry 1957]
  - Family †Cephalomyidae Ameghino 1897
  - Family †Eocardiidae Ameghino 1891
- Suborder Castorimorpha Wood 1955
  - Family †Eutypomyidae Miller & Gidley 1918
  - Family Geomyoidea Bonaparte, 1845
    - Subfamily †Mojavemyinae Korth and Chaney, 1999
  - Family †Rhizospalacidae Thaler 1966
- Suborder Anomaluromorpha Bugge 1974
  - Family †Parapedetidae McKenna & Bell 1997
- Suborder Myomorpha Brandt 1855
  - Family †Protoptychidae Schlosser 1911
  - Family †Anomalomyidae Schaub 1925
  - Family †Simimyidae Wood 1980
  - Family †Armintomyidae Dawson, Krishtalka & Stucky 1990

==== Order †Condylarthra ====
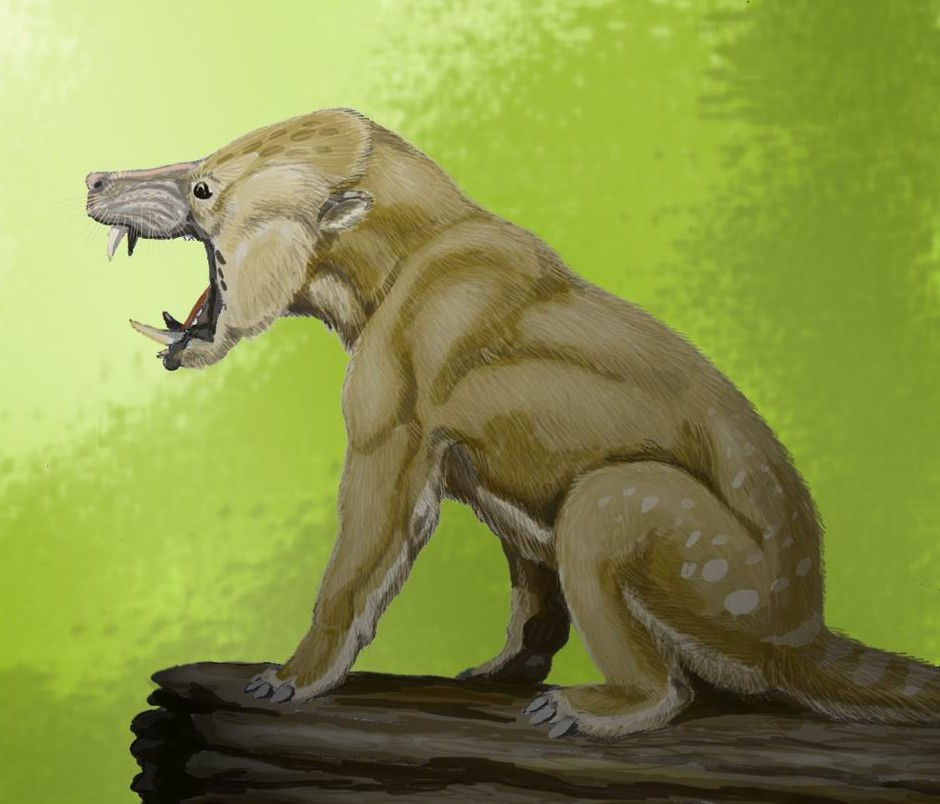
Arctocyon

Note: The "condylarths" are considered paraphyletic, i.e. a grouping of early ungulate-like mammals not necessarily closely related.
Paleocene–Eocene

- Family Arctocyonidae
  - Genus Arctocyon
  - Genus Chriacus
- Family Periptychidae
  - Genus Ectoconus
  - Genus Oxyacodon
- Family Hyopsodontidae
  - Genus Hyopsodus
- Family Mioclaenidae
- Family Phenacodontidae
  - Genus Meniscotherium
  - Genus Phenacodus
- Family Protungulatidae
  - Genus Protungulatum
- Family Didolodontidae
  - Genus Didolodus
- Family Sparnotheriodontidae?
- Family incertae sedis
  - Genus Abdounodus
  - Genus Ocepeia

==== Order †Mesonychia ====
- Family Triisodontidae
  - Eoconodon
  - Goniacodon
  - Stelocyon
  - Triisodon
- Family Hapalodectidae
  - Genus Hapalodectes
- Family Mesonychidae
  - Genus Ankalagon
  - Genus Mesonyx
    - Mesonyx obtusidens
  - Genus Dissacus
  - Genus Jiangxia
  - Genus Pachyaena
  - Genus Synoplotherium
  - Genus Sinonyx
  - Genus Yantanglestes

==== Order †Litopterna ====
Paleocene–Pleistocene

- Family Protolipternidae
- Superfamily Macrauchenioidea
  - Family Macraucheniidae
    - Genus Cramauchenia
    - Genus Macrauchenia
    - Genus Huayqueriana
    - Genus Paranauchenia
    - Genus Promacrauchenia
    - Genus Scalabrinitherium
    - Genus Theosodon
    - Genus Victorlemoinea
    - Genus Windhausenia
    - Genus Xenorhinotherium
  - Family Notonychopidae
  - Family Adianthidae
- Superfamily Proterotherioidea
  - Family Proterotheriidae
    - Genus Diadiaphorus
    - Genus Thoatherium

==== Order †Notoungulata ====
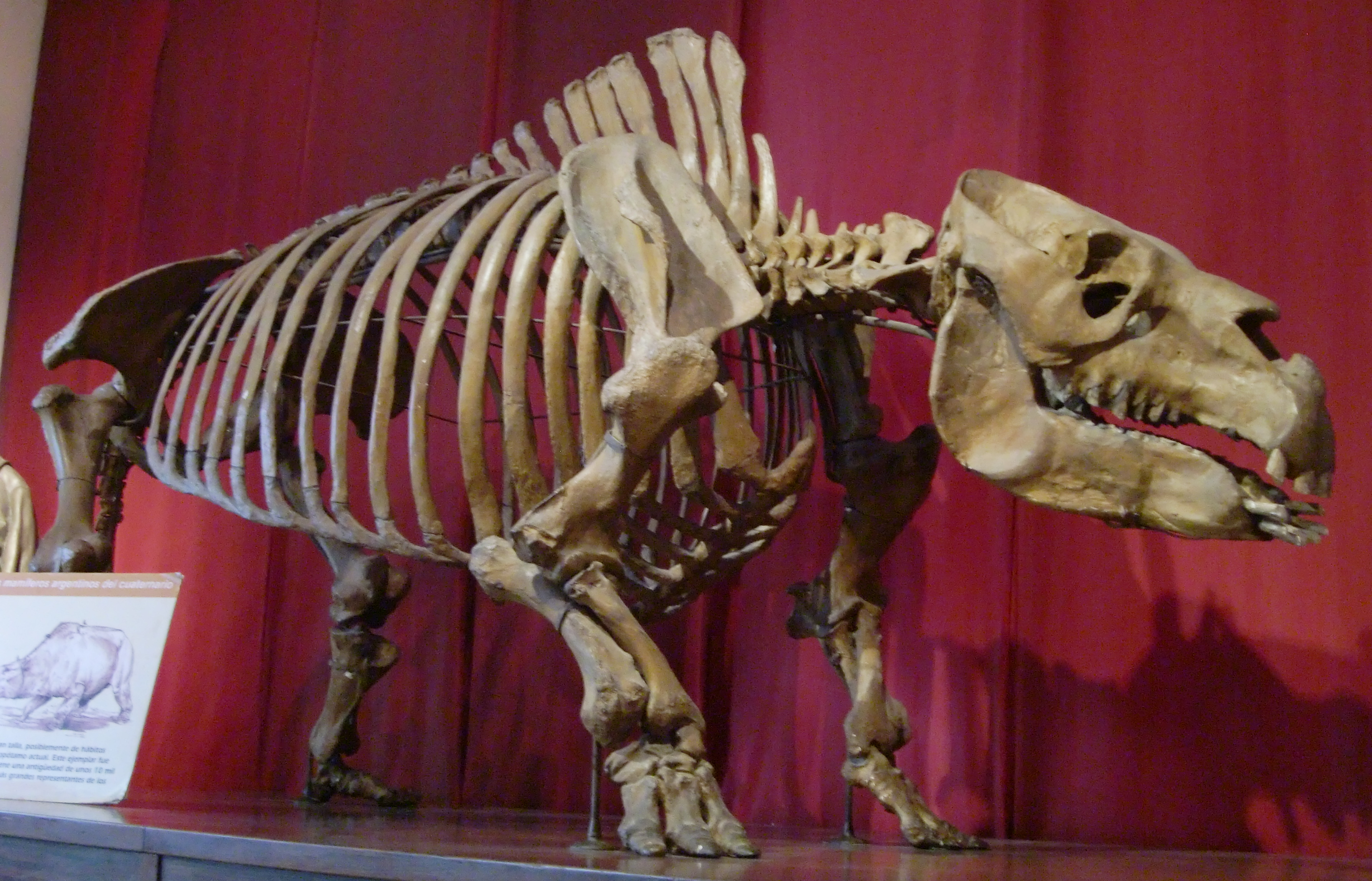
Toxodon

Paleocene–Pleistocene

===== Suborder Notioprogonia =====
- Family Henricosborniidae
- Family Notostylopidae
  - Genus Notostylops

===== Suborder Toxodontia =====
- Family Isotemnidae
  - Genus Thomashuxleya
- Family Leontiniidae
  - Genus Scarrittia
- Family Notohippidae
  - Genus Rhynchippus
- Family Toxodontidae
  - Genus Adinotherium
  - Genus Toxodon
  - Genus Trigodon
  - Genus Mixotoxodon
  - Genus Nesodon
- Family Homalodotheriidae
  - Genus Chasicotherium
  - Genus Homalodotherium

===== Suborder Typotheria =====
- Family Oldfieldthomasiidae
- Family Interatheriidae
  - Genus Protypotherium
  - Genus Interatherium
- Family Archaeopithecidae
- Family Campanorcidae
  - Genus Campanorco
- Family Mesotheriidae
  - Subfamily Fiandraiinae
    - Genus Fiandraia
  - Subfamily Mesotheriinae
    - Genus Altitypotherium
    - Genus Caraguatypotherium
    - Genus Eotypotherium
    - Genus Eutypotherium
    - Genus Hypsitherium
    - Genus Mesotherium
    - Genus Microtypotherium
    - Genus Plesiotypotherium
    - Genus Pseudotypotherium
    - Genus Typotheriopsis
  - Subfamily Trachytheriinae
    - Genus Anatrachytherus
    - Genus Trachytherus

===== Suborder Hegetotheria =====
- Family Archaeohyracidae
  - Genus Eohyrax
    - Eohyrax rusticus
- Family Hegetotheriidae
  - Genus Hemihegetotherium
    - Species Hemihegetotherium trilobus
  - Genus Pachyrukhos

==== Order †Astrapotheria ====
Eocene–Miocene

- Genus †Antarctodon Bond et al. 2011
- Genus †Astrapodon Ameghino 1891
- Genus †Edvardocopeia Ameghino 1901
- Genus †Monoeidodon Roth 1898
- Genus †Proplanodus Ameghino 1902
- Genus †Tonorhinus Ameghino 1904 [Notorhinus Roth 1903 non Leng 1884]
- Genus †Pleurystylops Ameghino 1901
- Genus †Pseudostylops Ameghino 1901
- Genus †Shecenia Simpson 1935
- Genus †Traspoatherium Ameghino 1894
- Genus †Tychostylops Ameghino 1901
- Genus †Tetragonostylops Paula Couto 1963
- Family †Eoastrapostylopidae Soria & Powell 1981
  - Genus †Eoastrapostylops Soria & Powell 1981
- Family †Trigonostylopidae Ameghino 1901
  - Genus †Trigonostylops Ameghino 1897 [Chiodon Berg 1899; Staurodon Roth 1899 non Lowe 1854]
- Family †Albertogaudryinae Simpson 1945
  - Genus †Albertogaudryia Ameghino 1901
- Family †Astrapotheriidae Ameghino 1887
  - Genus †Isolophodon Roth 1903
  - Genus †Scaglia Simpson 1957
  - Genus †Astraponotus Ameghino 1901 [Notamynus Roth 1903; Grypolophodon Roth 1903; Megalophodon Roth 1903]
  - Genus †Maddenia Kramarz & Bond 2009 non Hook.f. & Thomson
  - Genus †Comahuetherium Kramarz & Bond 2011
  - Genus †Parastrapotherium Ameghino 1895 [Liarthrus Ameghino 1895; Traspoatherium Ameghino 1895; Henricofilholia Ameghino 1901; Helicolophodon Roth 1903]
  - Subfamily †Astrapotheriinae Ameghino 1887
    - Genus †Astrapothericulus Ameghino 1901
    - Genus †Astrapotherium Burmeister 1879 [Listriotherium Mercerat 1891; Mesembriotherium Moreno 1882; Xylotherium Mercerat 1891]
  - Subfamily †Uruguaytheriinae Kraglievich 1928
    - Genus †Uruguaytherium Kraglievich 1928
    - Genus †Granastrapotherium Johnson & Madden 1997
    - Genus †Hilarcotherium Vallejo-Pareja et al. 2015
    - Genus †Xenastrapotherium Kraglievich 1928 [Synastrapotherium Paula Couto 1976]

==== Order †Xenungulata ====
Paleogene

- Family †Carodniidae Paula Couto 1952 [Etayoidae Villarroel 1987]
  - Genus †Notoetayoa Gelfo, López & Bond 2008
  - Genus †Etayoa Villarroel 1987
  - Genus †Carodnia Simpson 1935 [Ctalecarodnia Simpson 1935]

==== Order †Pyrotheria ====
Eocene–Oligocene

- Family †Colombitheriidae Hoffstetter 1970
  - Genus †Baguatherium
  - Genus †Colombitherium Hoffstetter 1970
  - Genus †Proticia Patterson 1977
- Family †Pyrotheriidae Ameghino 1889 [Carolozittelidae Ameghino 1901]
  - Genus †Planodus Ameghino 1887
  - Genus †Carolozittelia Ameghino 1901 [Archaeolophus Ameghino 1897]
  - Genus †Griphodon Anthony 1924
  - Genus †Propyrotherium Ameghino 1901 [Promoeritherium Ameghino 1906]
  - Genus †Pyrotherium Ameghino 1889 [Ricardowenia Ameghino 1901; Parapyrotherium Ameghino 1902]

==== Order †Dinocerata ====
Eocene–Eocene

- Family †Uintatheriidae Flower 1876 [Tinoceratidae Marsh 1872; Sphaleroceratinae Brandt 1878; Eobasiliidae Cope 1873]
  - Genus †Megaceratops Cope 1873
  - Subfamily †Gobiatheriinae Flerov 1950
    - Genus †Gobiatherium Osborn & Granger 1932
  - Subfamily †Uintatheriinae Flower 1876 [Prodinoceratidae Flerov 1952; Bathyopsidae Osborn 1898]
    - Genus † Matthew, Granger & Simpson 1929 Jiaoloutherium Tong 1978; Houyanotherium Tong 1978; Zhaia Kretzoi & Kretzoi 2000; Pyrodon Zhai 1978; Phenaceras Tong 1979; Ganatherium Tong 1979; Eobathyopsis Osborn 1929; Mongolotherium Flerov 1952]
    - Genus †Probathyopsis Cope 1881 [Bathyopsoides Patterson 1939; Prouintatherium Dorr 1958]
    - Genus †Bathyopsis Cope 1881
    - Genus †Uintatherium Leidy 1872c [Dinoceras Marsh 1872; Ditetroedon Cope 1885; Elachoceras Scott 1886; Laoceras Marsh 1886; Octotomus Cope 1885; Paroceras Marsh 1886; Platoceras Marsh 1886; Tinoceras Marsh 1872; Uintamastix Leidy 1872]
    - Genus †Eobasileus Cope 1872 [Uintacolotherium Cook 1926; Lefelaphodon Cope 1872]
    - Genus †Tetheopsis Cope 1885

==== Order †Arctostylopida ====
- Family Arctostylopidae Schlosser 1923
  - Genus †Allostylops Zheng 1979
  - Genus †Wanostylops Huang & Zheng 1997
  - Subfamily †Kazachostylopinae Nesov 1987
    - Genus †Kazachostylopus Nesov 1987
  - Subfamily †Asiastylopinae
    - Genus †Asiastylops Zheng 1979
  - Subfamily †Arctostylopinae [Palaeostylopidae Hau 1976]
    - Tribe †Sinostylopini
      - Genus †Sinostylops Tang & Yan 1976
      - Genus †Bothriostylops Zheng & Huang 1986
    - Tribe †Arctostylopini
      - Genus †Arctostylops Matthew 1915
      - Genus †Palaeostylops Matthew & Granger 1925
      - Genus †Gashatostylops Cifelli, Schaff & McKenna 1989
      - Genus †Anatolostylops Zheng 1979

==== Order †Creodonta ====
Paleocene–Late Miocene

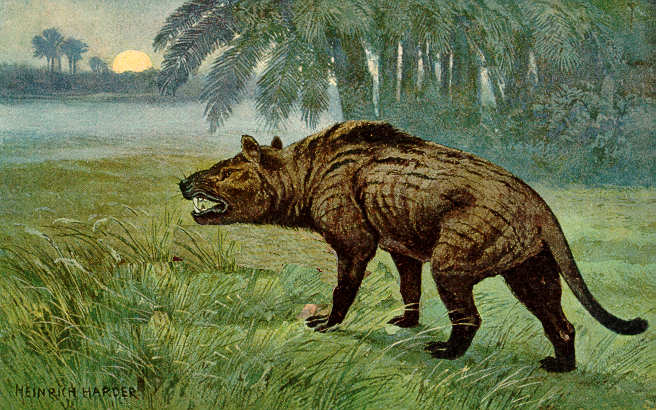
Hyaenodon

- Genus †Preregidens Solé, Falconnet & Vidalenc 2015
- Genus †Prionogale Schmidt-Kittler & Heizmann 1991
- Subfamily †Koholiinae Crochet 1988
- Subfamily †Machaeroidinae Matthew 1909
- Family †Oxyaenidae Cope 1877
  - Genus †Oxyaena Cope 1873
  - Genus †Palaeonictis Blainville 1842
  - Genus †Patriofelis Leidy 1872
  - Genus †Sarkastodon Granger 1938
  - Genus †Apataelurus Scott 1938
- Family †Hyaenodontidae Leidy 1869 [Proviverridae Schlosser 1886; Limnocyonidae Gazin 1946; Stypolophinae Trouessart 1885]
  - Genus †Hyaenodon Laizer & Parieu 1838
  - Genus †Megistotherium Savage 1973
  - Genus †Sinopa Leidy 1871

==== Order Carnivora ====
Paleocene–Recent

- Genus †Ravenictis Fox & Youzwyshyn 1994 [? Carnivoramorpha]

===== Suborder Caniformia (dog-like carnivores) =====
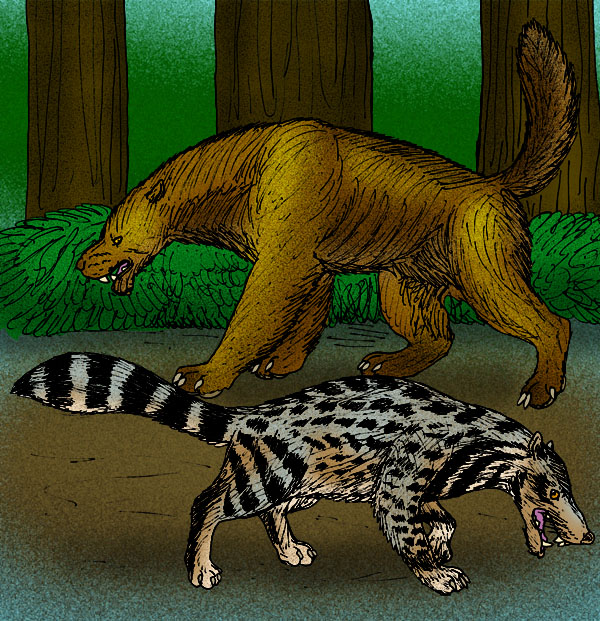
Ekorus

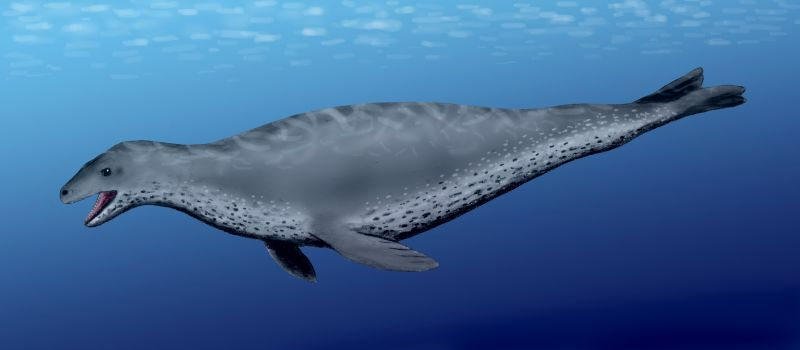
Acrophoca

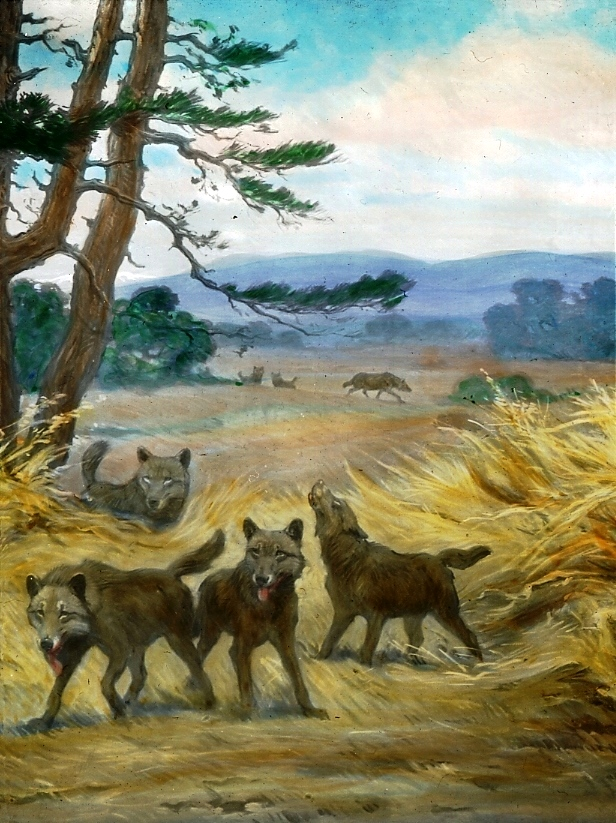
Dire wolf

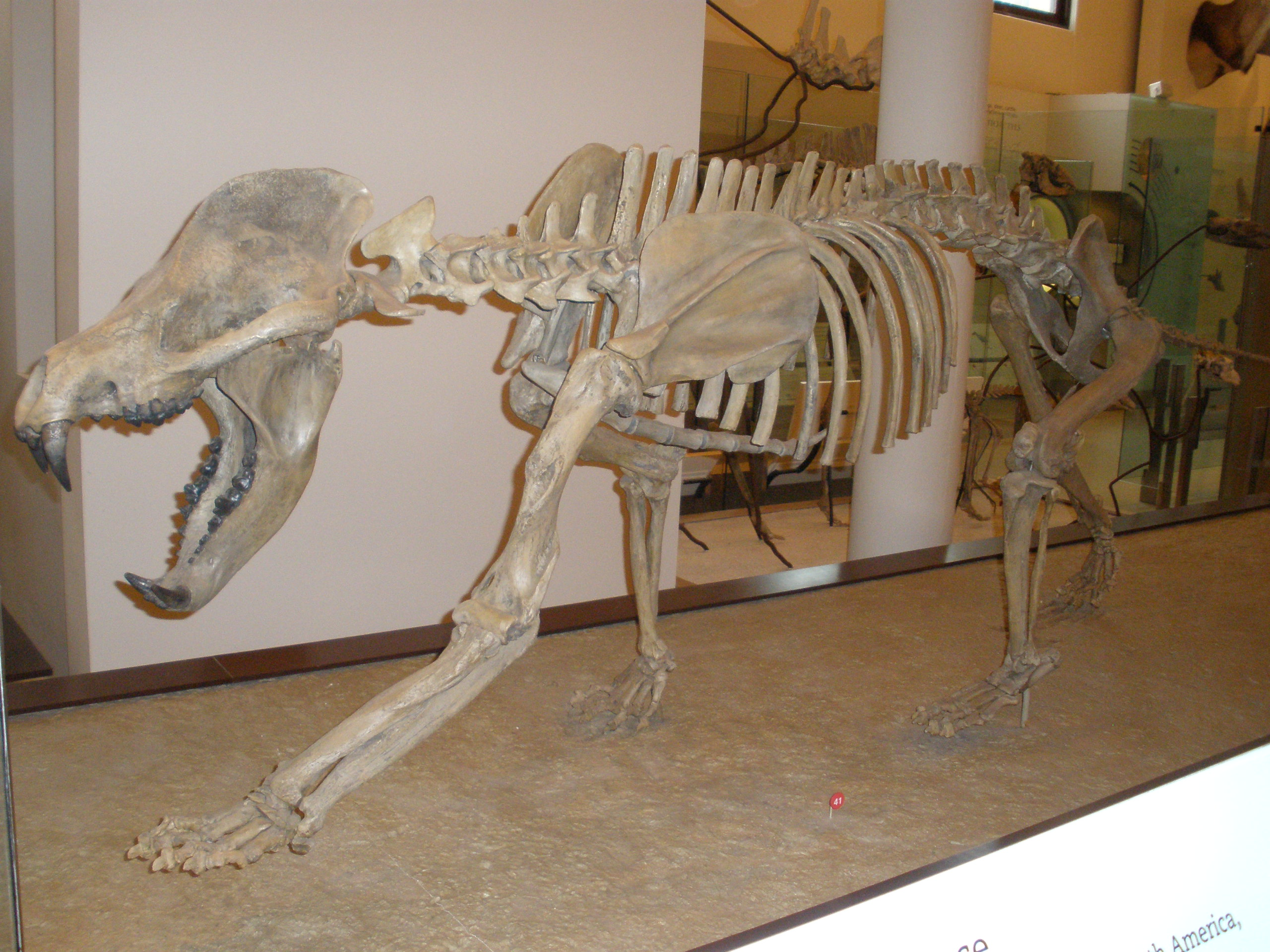
Amphicyon

- Superfamily Amphicyonoidea
  - Family Amphicyonidae (bear-dogs)
    - Genus Amphicyon
    - Genus Cynodictis
    - Genus Daphoenus
- Infraorder Arctoidea
  - Parvorder Mustelida
    - Family Procyonidae (raccoon family)
      - Genus Chapalmalania
    - Family Mephitidae (skunks)
    - Family Mustelidae (weasel family)
      - Genus Algarolutra
      - Genus Cyrnaonyx
      - Genus Ekorus
      - Genus Megalenhydris
      - Genus Plesictis
      - Genus Sardolutra
    - Family Ailuridae (red panda family)
      - Genus Actiocyon
      - Genus Alopecocyon
      - Genus Amphictis
      - Genus Magerictis
      - Genus Parailurus
      - Genus Pristinailurus
      - Genus Protursus
      - Genus Simocyon
  - Parvorder Pinnipedomorpha
    - Family Amphicynodontidae?
    - Family Semantoridae
      - Genus Potamotherium
    - Superfamily Pinnipedia
      - Family Enaliarctidae
        - Genus Enaliarctos
      - Family Otariidae (eared seals)
      - Family Odobenidae (walruses)
        - Genus Imagotaria
      - Family Phocidae (Earless seals)
        - Genus Acrophoca
        - Genus Desmatophoca
  - Parvorder Ursida
    - Superfamily Ursoidea
      - Family Ursidae (bears)
        - Genus Ursavus
        - Subfamily Hemicyoninae
          - Genus Cephalogale
          - Genus Dinocyon
          - Genus Hemicyon
          - Genus Phoberocyon
          - Genus Phoberogale
          - Genus Plithocyon
          - Genus Zaragocyon
        - Subfamily Ailuropodinae (pandas)
          - Genus Agriarctos
          - Genus Ailurarctos
          - Genus Ailuropoda
            - Ailuropoda microta
          - Genus Agriotherium
          - Genus Huracan
          - Genus Indarctos
          - Genus Kretzoiarctos
        - Subfamily Tremarctinae (short-faced bears)
          - Genus Arctodus
          - Genus Arctotherium
          - Genus Plionarctos
          - Genus Tremarctos
            - Florida cave bear (Tremarctos floridanus)
        - Subfamily Ursinae
          - Genus Ursus
            - Auvergne bear (Ursus minimus)
            - Etruscan bear (Ursus etruscus)
            - Eurasian cave bear (Ursus spelaeus)
- Infraorder Cynoidea
  - Family Canidae (Canids)
    - Genus Canis (dogs and wolves)
      - Dire wolf (Canis dirus)
      - Canis falconeri
      - Canis lepophagus
    - Genus Cerdocyon
    - Genus Cynodesmus
    - Genus Leptocyon
    - Genus Phlaocyon
      - Subfamily Hesperocyoninae
        - Genus Hesperocyon
      - Subfamily Borophaginae
        - Genus Aelurodon
        - Genus Borophagus
        - Genus Epicyon
        - Genus Osteoborus
- Family Miacidae
  - Genus Miacis

===== Suborder Feliformia (cat-like carnivores) =====
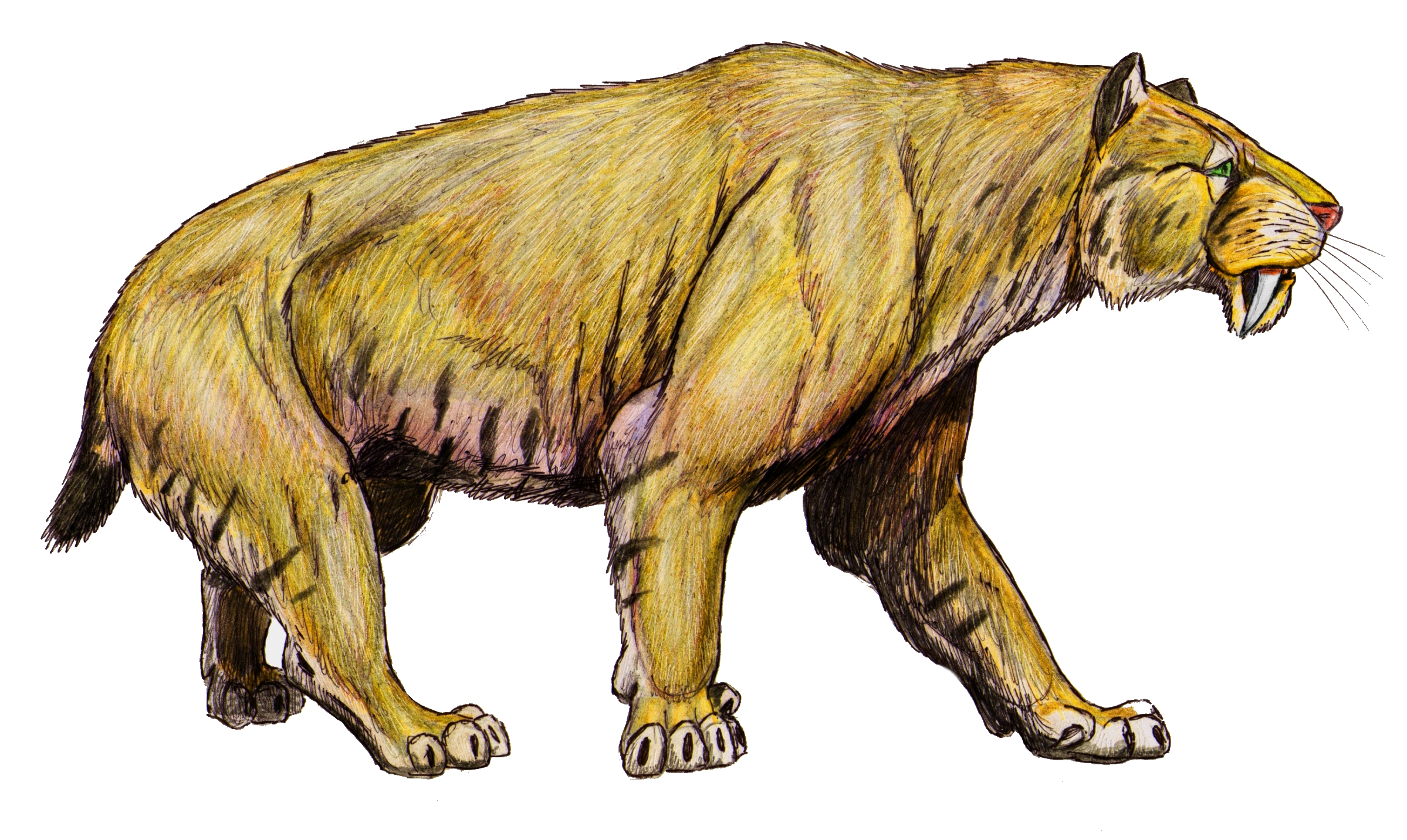
Smilodon populator

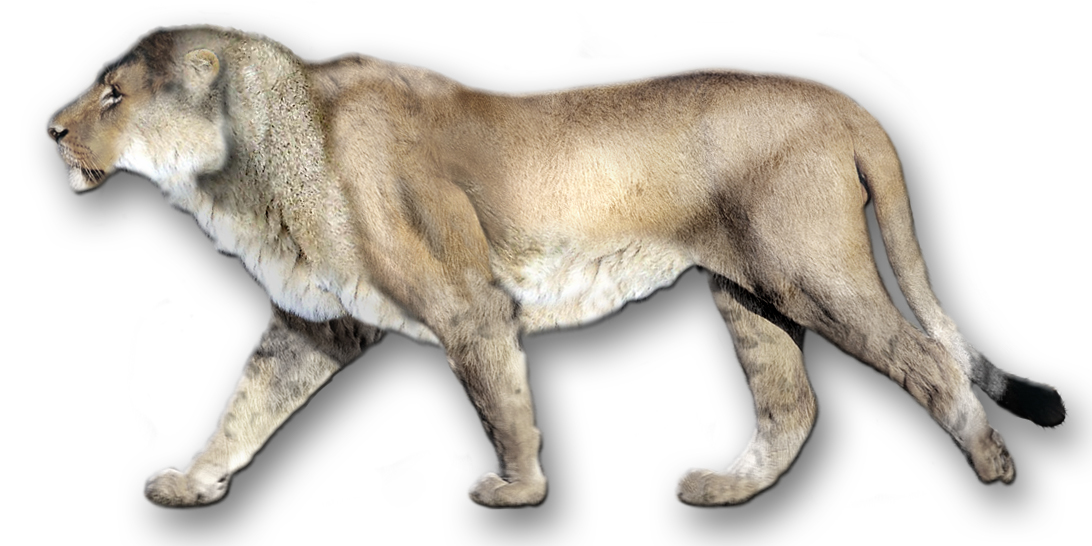
American lion

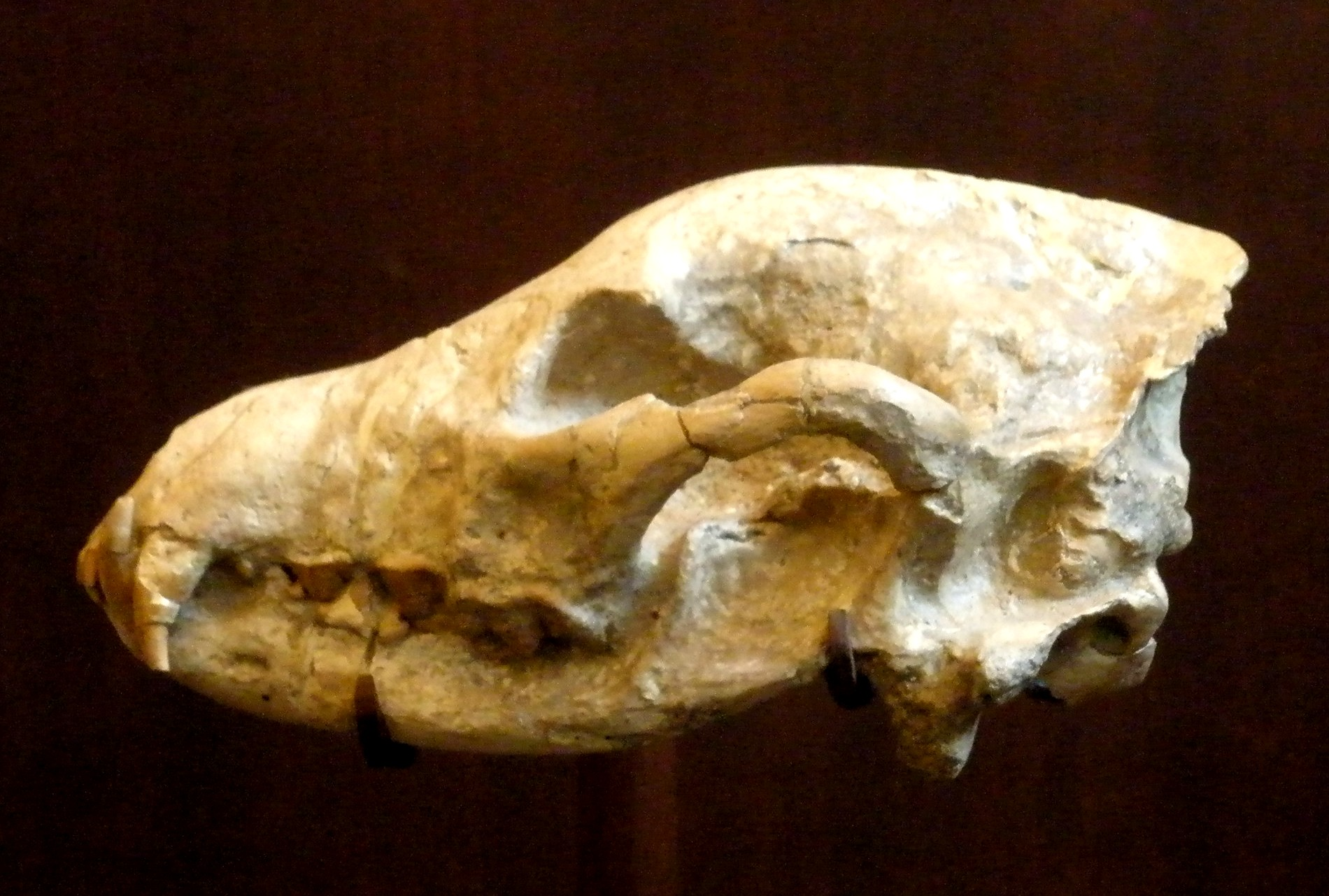
Ictitherium

- Family Felidae (Felids)
  - Subfamily Proailurinae
    - Genus Proailurus
      - Proailurus lemanensis
    - Genus Pseudaelurus
  - Subfamily Machairodontinae (Sabre-toothed cats)
    - Genus Tchadailurus
      - Tchadailurus adei
    - Tribe Metailurini
      - Genus Metailurus
        - Metailurus major
        - Metailurus mongonliensis
        - Metailurus boodon
        - Metailurus ultimus
      - Genus Adelphailurus
        - Adelphailurus kansensis
      - Genus Stenailurus
        - Stenailurus teilhardi
      - Genus Dinofelis
        - Dinofelis cristata
        - Dinofelis diastemata
        - Dinofelis paleoonca
        - Dinofelis barlowi
        - Dinofelis piveteaui
        - Dinofelis aronoki
        - Dinofelis darti
        - Dinofelis petteri
      - Genus Yoshi
        - Yoshi minor
        - Yoshi garevskii
    - Tribe Smilodontini
      - Genus Smilodon
        - Smilodon gracilis
        - Smilodon fatalis
        - Smilodon populator
      - Genus Rhizosmilodon
        - Rhizosmilodon fiteae
      - Genus Megantereon
        - Megantereon cultridens
        - Megantereon ekidoit
        - Megantereon inexpectatus
        - Megantereon microta
        - Megantereon nihowanensis
        - Megantereon vakhshensis
        - Megantereon whitei
      - Genus Promegantereon
        - Promegantereon ogygia
      - Genus Paramachairodus
        - Paramachairodus orientalis
        - Paramachairodus miximiliani
        - Paramachairodus transasiaticus
    - Tribe Homotherini
      - Genus Homotherium
        - Homotherium latidens
        - Homotherium serum
        - Homotherium venezuelensis
        - Homotherium ischyrus
      - Genus Lokotunjailurus
        - Lokotunjailurus emgeritus
        - Lokotunjailurus fanonei
      - Genus Nimravides
        - Nimravides catacopsis
        - Nimravides pedionomus
        - Nimravides hibbardi
        - Nimravides galiani
        - Nimravides thinobates
      - Genus Xenosmilus
        - Xenosmilus hodsonae
      - Genus Amphimachairodus
        - Amphimachairodus giganteus
        - Amphimachairodus coloradensis
        - Amphimachairodus kuteni
        - Amphimachairodus kabir
    - Tribe Machairodontini
      - Genus Machairodus
        - Machairodus africanus
        - Machairodus aphanistus
        - Machairodus horribilis
        - Machairodus robinsoni
        - Machairodus alberdiae
        - Machairodus laskerevi
        - Machairodus oradensis
      - Genus Miomachairodus
        - Miomachairodus pseudaeluroides
      - Genus Hemimachairodus
        - Hemimachairodus zwierzyckii
  - Subfamily Felinae (Conical-toothed cats)
    - Tribe Pantherini
      - Genus Panthera
        - Panthera atrox
        - Panthera spelaea
        - Panthera palaeosinensis
        - Panthera youngi
        - Panthera blytheae
        - Panthera zdanskyi
        - Panthera gombaszoegensis
    - Tribe Felini
      - Genus Acinonyx
        - Acinonyx pardinensis
        - Acinonyx aicha
        - Acinonyx intermedius
      - Genus Puma
        - Puma pardoides
        - Puma pumoides
      - Genus Lynx
        - Lynx issiodorensis
        - Lynx thomasi
        - Lynx rexroadensis
      - Genus Leopardus
        - Leopardus vorohuensis
      - Genus Felis
        - Felis lunensis
        - Felis imperialis
      - Genus Pristifelis
        - Pristifelis attica
      - Genus Miracinonyx
        - Miracinonyx inexpectatus
        - Miracinonyx trumani
      - Genus Katifelis
        - Katifelis nightingalei
      - Genus Asilifelis
        - Asilifelis coteae
      - Genus Namafelis
        - Namafelis minor
      - Genus Diamantofelis
        - Diamantofelis ferox
      - Genus Pratifelis
        - Pratifelis martini
      - Genus Sivapanthera
        - Sivapanthera brachygnathus
        - Sivapanthera pleistocaenicus
        - Sivapanthera potens
        - Sivapanthera linxiaensis
        - Sivapanthera padhriensis
      - Genus Sivaelurus
        - Sivaelurus chinjiensis
      - Genus Vishnufelis
      - Genus Dolichofelis
      - Genus Sivapardus
- Family Herpestidae (mongooses)
- Family Hyaenidae (hyenas)
  - Genus Chasmaporthetes
  - Genus Crocuta
    - Crocuta spelaea
    - Crocuta macrodonta
    - Crocuta eximia
    - Crocuta sivalensis
    - Crocuta dietrichi
  - Genus Protictitherium
  - Genus Ictitherium
  - Genus Chasmaporthetes
  - Genus Adcrocuta
  - Genus Pachycrocuta
  - Genus Percrocuta
- Family Nandiniidae
- Family Viverravidae (viverravids)
- Family Viverridae (civets)
  - Genus Kanuites
  - Genus Viverra
    - Viverra leakeyi
    - Vishnuictis
- Family Stenoplesictidae
- Family Nimravidae (nimravids)
  - Genus Nimravus
  - Genus Eusmilus
  - Genus Hoplophoneus

to be sorted

- Genus Lokotunjailurus

==== Superorder Xenarthra (Edentata) ====
Paleocene–Recent

Genus †Protobradys? Ameghino 1902 [Incertae sedis]

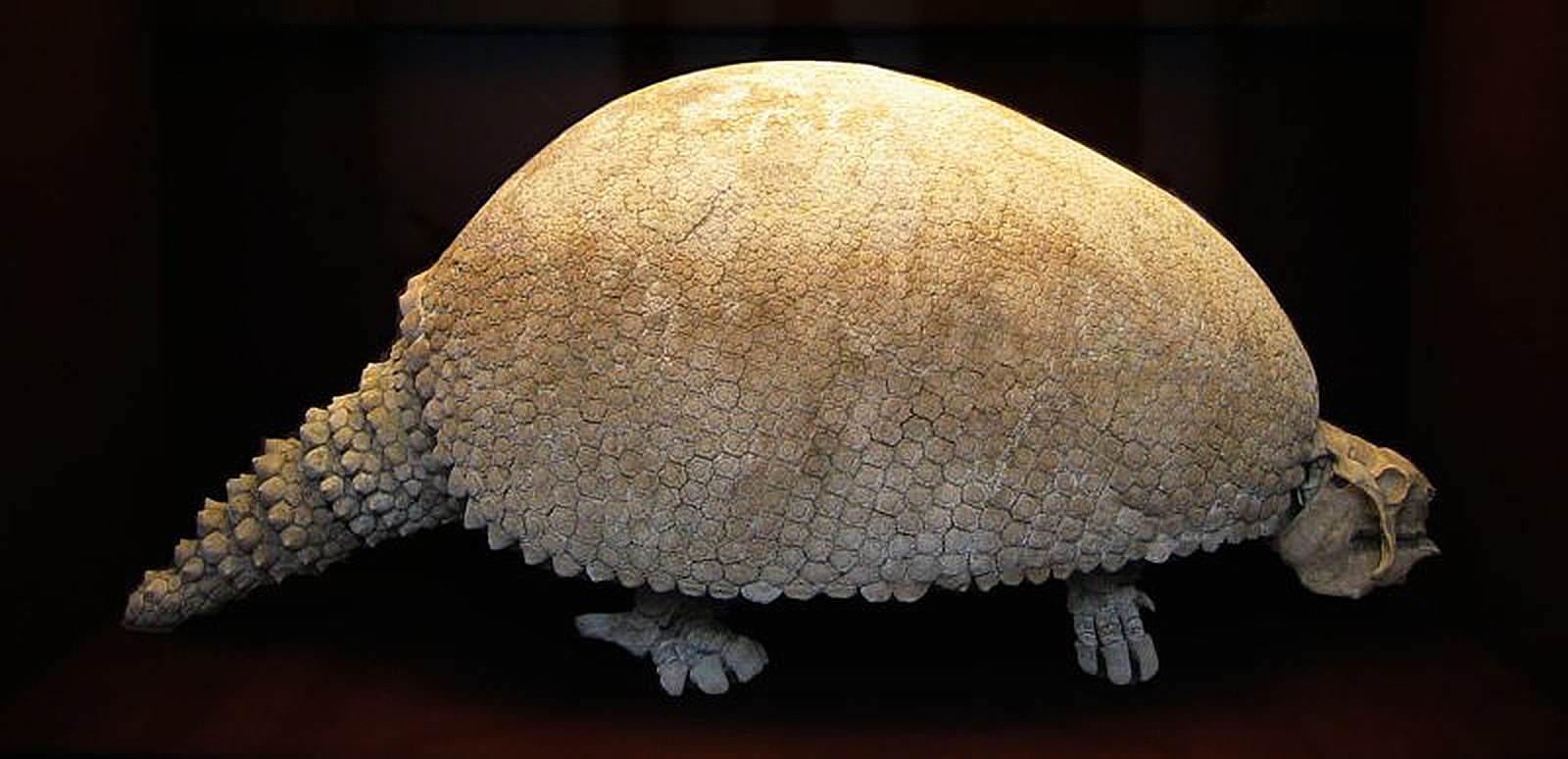
Glyptodon

- Order Cingulata Illiger 1811 [Loricata Owen 1842 non Merrem 1820; Hicanodonta Ameghino 1889] (armadillos)
  - Family †Peltephilidae Ameghino 1894
    - Genus †Peltephilus Ameghino 1887 [Cochlops Ameghino 1889; Gephyranodus Ameghino 1891]
    - Genus †Peltecoelus Ameghino 1902
    - Genus †Parapeltecoelus Bordas 1938
    - Genus †Anantiosodon Ameghino 1891
    - Genus †Epipeltephilus Ameghino 1904
  - Family Dasypodidae Gray 1821 [Stegotheridae Ameghino 1889; Scoteopsidae Ameghino 1894; Astegotheriidae Ameghino 1906; Tatusidae Burnett 1830; Praopidae Ameghino 1889; Tolypeutidae Gray 1869; Scleropleuridae Lahille 1895]
    - Subfamily Dasypodinae Gray 1821 sensu Gill 1872
      - Genus †Punatherium Ciancio et al. 2016
      - Tribe †Stegotheriini Ameghino 1889 sensu Patterson & Pascual 1968 [Stegotherinae Trouessant 1898]
        - Genus †Riostegotherium Oliveira & Bergqvist 1998
        - Genus †Prostegotherium Ameghino 1902
        - Genus †Pseudostegotherium Ameghino 1902
        - Genus †Astegotherium Ameghino 1902
        - Genus †Stegosimpsonia Vizcaíno 1994
        - Genus †Stegotherium Ameghino 1887 [Scotoeops Ameghino 1887]
      - Tribe Dasypodini Gray 1821
        - Genus †Propraopus Ameghino 1881 [Pontotatus Ameghino 1908]
        - Genus †Dasypodon Castellanos 1925
        - Genus †Pliodasypus Castro et al. 2014
    - Subfamily Tolypeutinae Gray 1865 [Tolypeutina Gray 1865; Tolypeutinae Alberdi, Leone & Tonni 1995; Priodontinae Patterson & Pascual 1968]
      - Genus †Kuntinatu Billet, Hautier, de Muizon & Valentin 2011
    - Subfamily Euphractinae Winge 1923
      - Genus †Coelutaelus Ameghino 1902
      - Tribe †Utaetini Simpson 1945
        - Genus †Utaetus Ameghino 1902 [Posteutatus Ameghino 1902; Pareutaetus Ameghino 1902; Orthutaetus Ameghino 1902]
      - Tribe Eutatini Bordas 1933 [Eutaninae Bordas 1933]
        - Genus †Meteutatus Ameghino 1902 [Sadypus Ameghino 1902]
        - Genus †Anteutatus Ameghino 1902
        - Genus †Pseudeutatus Ameghino 1902 [Pachyzaedyus Ameghino 1902]
        - Genus †Stenotatus Ameghino 1891 [Stegotheriopsis Bordas 1939; Prodasypus Ameghino 1894]
        - Genus †Proeutatus Ameghino 1891 [Thoracotherium Mercerat 1891]
        - Genus †Archaeutatus Ameghino 1902
        - Genus †Paraeutatus Scott 1903 [Proparaeutatus Trouessart 1905]
        - Genus †Doellotatus Bordas 1932 [Eutatopsis Kraglievich 1934]
        - Genus †Chasicotatus Scillato-Yané 1977
        - Genus †Ringueletia Reig 1958
        - Genus †Eutatus Gervais 1867
      - Tribe Euphractini Winge 1923 [Euphractinae Pocock 1924]
        - Genus †Isutaetus Ameghino 1902
        - Genus †Anutaetus Ameghino 1902
        - Genus †Hemiutaetus Ameghino 1902
        - Genus †Amblytatus Ameghino 1902
        - Genus †Eodasypus Ameghino 1894
        - Genus †Prozaedyus Ameghino 1891
        - Genus †Vetelia Ameghino 1891
        - Genus †Proeuphractus Ameghino 1886
        - Genus †Paleuphractus Kraglievich 1934
        - Genus †Chorobates Reig 1958
        - Genus †Macroeuphractus Ameghino 1887 [Dasypotherium Moreno 1889]
        - Genus †Paraeuphractus Scillato-Yané 1980
        - Genus †Acantharodeia Rovereto 1914 [Macrochorobates Scillato-Yané 1980]
  - Superfamily Glyptodontoidea
    - Family †Pampatheriidae Paula Couto 1954
      - Genus †Tonnicinctus Góis et al. 2015
      - Genus †Machlydotherium Ameghino 1902
      - Genus †Kraglievichia Castellanos 1927 [Kraglievichia Castellanos 1937; Plaina Castellanos 1937]
      - Genus †Vassallia Castellanos 1927
      - Genus †Scirrotherium Edmund & Theodor 1997
      - Genus †Pampatherium Gervais & Ameghino 1880 [Pampatherium Ameghino 1875 nomen nudum; Chlamytherium Lund 1839; Clamydotherium Lund 1839 non Bronn 1838; Hoffstetteria Castellanos 1957]
      - Genus †Holmesina Simpson 1930
    - Family †Paleopeltidae Ameghino 1895 [Pseudorophodontidae Hoffstetter 1954]
      - Genus †Palaeopeltis Ameghino 1895 [Pseudorophodon Hoffstetter 1954]
    - Family †Glyptodontidae Gray 1969 [Haplophoridae Huxley 1864 sensu McKenna & Bell 1997; Doedicuridae Ameghino 1889; Propalaehoplophoridae Ameghino 1891; Sclerocalyptidae Ameghino 1904]
      - Genus †Heterodon Lund 1838 [preoccupied, nomen nudum?]
      - Genus †Orycterotherium Bronn 1838
      - Tribe †Neothoracophorini Castellanos 1951
        - Genus †Pseudoneothoracophorus Castellanos 1951
        - Genus †Neothoracophorus Ameghino 1889 [Thoracophorus Gervais & Ameghino 1880 non Hope 1840; Myloglyptodon Ameghino 1884; Pseudothoracophorus Castellanos 1951]
      - Subfamily †Glyptatelinae Castellanos 1932
        - Genus †Glyptatelus Ameghino 1897
        - Genus †Clypeotherium Scillato-Yané 1977
        - Genus †Neoglyptatelus Garlini, Vizcaíno & Scillato-Yané 1997
        - Genus †Pachyarmatherium Downing & White 1995
      - Subfamily †Propalaehoplophorinae Ameghino 1891
        - Genus †Propalaehoplophorus Ameghino 1887 [Propalaeohaplophorus Castellanos 1932; Propaleohoplophorus Frailey 1988]
        - Genus †Metopotoxus Ameghino 1895
        - Genus †Eucinepeltus Ameghino 1891
        - Genus †Asterostemma Ameghino 1889
      - Subfamily †Doedicurinae Ameghino 1889
        - Genus †Eleutherocercus Koken 1888
        - Genus †Prodaedicurus Castellanos 1927 [Palaeodoedicurus Castellanos 1927]
        - Genus †Comaphorus Ameghino 1886
        - Genus †Castellanosia Kraglievich 1932
        - Genus †Xiphuroides Castellanos 1927
        - Genus †Doedicurus Burmeister 1874
        - Genus †Daedicuroides Castellanos 1941
        - Genus †Plaxhaplous Ameghino 1884
      - Subfamily †Glyptodontinae Gray 1869
        - Tribe †Glyptotheriini Castellanos 1953
          - Genus †Glyptotherium [Brachyostracon Brown 1912; Boreostracon Simpron 1929; Xenoglyptodon Meade 1953]
        - Tribe †Glyptodontini Gray 1869
          - Genus †Glyptodontidium Cabrera 1944
          - Genus †Glyptodon Owen 1839 [Lepitherium Saint-Hilaire 1839; Lepidotherium Agassiz 1846; Pachypus D'Alton 1839 non Dejean 1831; Schistopleurum Nodot 1857; Glyptocoileus Castellanos 1952; Glyptopedius Castellanos 1953; Glyptostracon Castellanos 1953]
          - Genus †Stromatherium Castellanos 1953
          - Genus †Chlamydotherium Bronn 1838
          - Genus †Glyptostracon Castellanos 1953
      - Subfamily †Hoplophorinae Huxley 1864 [Sclerocalyptinae Trouessart 1898]
        - Genus †Asymmetrura Farina 1981
        - Genus †Caudaphorus Farina 1981
        - Genus †Uruguayurus Mones 1987
        - Tribe †Hoplophorini Huxley 1864 sensu McKenna & Bell 1997
          - Genus †Hoplophorus Lund 1838 [Sclerocalyptus Ameghino 1891]
          - Genus †Stromaphorus Castellanos 1926
          - Genus †Eusclerocalyptus Ameghino 1919
          - Genus †Hoplophractus Cabrera 1939
          - Genus †Trachycalyptus Ameghino 1908
          - Genus †Berthawyleria Castellanos 1939
          - Genus †Parahoplophorus Castellanos 1932
          - Genus †Isolinia Castellanos 1951
          - Genus †Stromaphoropsis Kraglievich 1932
          - Genus †Eosclerophorus Castellanos 1948
          - Genus †Trabalia Kraglievich 1932
          - Genus †Neosclerocalyptus Paula Couto 1957
        - Tribe †Palaehoplophorini Hoffstetter 1958
          - Genus †Palaehoplophorus Ameghino 1883
          - Genus †Aspidocalyptus Cabrera 1939
          - Genus †Chlamyphractus Castellanos 1939
          - Genus †Pseudoeuryurus Ameghino 1889
          - Genus †Protoglyptodon Ameghino 1885
        - Tribe †Lomaphorini Hoffstetter 1958
          - Genus †Peiranoa Castellanos 1946
          - Genus †Lomaphorops Castellanos 1932
          - Genus †Urotherium Castellanos 1926
          - Genus †Lomaphorus Ameghino 1889
          - Genus †Trachycalyptoides Saint-André 1996
        - Tribe †Plohophorini Castellanos 1932
          - Genus †Coscinocercus Cabrera 1939
          - Genus †Phlyctaenopyga Cabrera 1944
          - Genus †Plohophorops Rusconi 1934
          - Genus †Plohophorus Ameghino 1887
          - Genus †Pseudoplohophorus Castellanos 1926
          - Genus †Teisseiria Kraglievich 1932
          - Genus †Plohophoroides Castellanos 1928
          - Genus †Zaphilus Ameghino 1889
        - Tribe †Neuryurini Hoffstetter 1958
          - Genus †Neuryurus Ameghino 1889 [Euryurus Gervais & Ameghino 1880 non Koch 1847 non Von Der Marck 1864]
        - Tribe †Panochthini Castellanos 1927
          - Genus †Nopachthus Ameghino 1888
          - Genus †Panochthus Burmeister 1866 [Schistopleurum Nodot 1855]
          - Genus †Propanochthus Castellanos 1925
          - Genus †Parapanochthus Moreira 1971

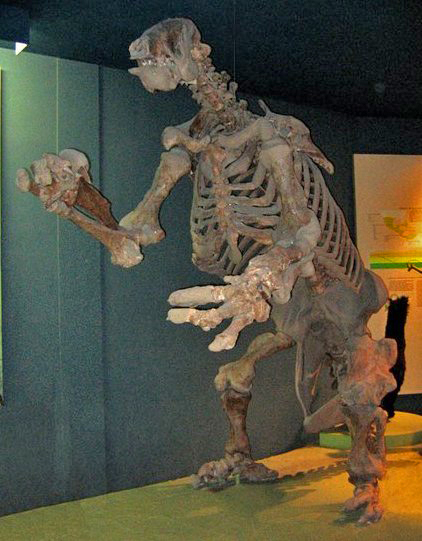
Eremotherium

- Order Pilosa Flower 1883 [Bradypoda Blumenbach 1779; Anicanodonta Ameghino 1889]
  - Genus †Trematherium Ameghino 1887
  - Family †Entelopidae Ameghino 1889 [Entelopsidae Ameghino 1889; Dideilotheridae Ameghino 1894]
    - Genus †Entelops Ameghino 1887
    - Genus †Delotherium Ameghino 1889 [Dideilotherium Ameghino 1889]
  - Infraorder Vermilingua Illiger 1811 emend. Gray 1869 [Scandentia Fischer de Waldheim 1817 non Wagner 1855] (Hairy anteaters)
    - Genus †Argyromanis Ameghino 1904
    - Genus †Orthoarthrus Ameghino 1904
    - Family Cyclopedidae Pocock 1924 (silky/pygmy/two-toed anteater)
      - Genus †Palaeomyrmidon Roverento 1914
    - Family Myrmecophagidae Gray 1825 (tamandu)
      - Genus †Promyrmecophagus Ameghino 1904
      - Genus †Protamandua Ameghino 1904
      - Genus †Neotamandua Rovereto 1914
  - Infraorder Folivora Delsuc et al. 2001 [Phyllophaga Owen 1842 non Harris 1827; Phytophaga Huxley 1871; Tardigrada Latham & Davies 1795 sensu McKenna, Wyss & Flynn 2006 non non Spallanzani 1777; Tardigradae Gray 1821; Gravigrada Owen 1842] (sloths)
    - Genus †Amphiocnus Kraglievich 1922
    - Genus †Diellipsodon Berg 1899 [Elipsodon Roth 1898 non Elliopsodon Scott 1892 non Ellipsodon Scott 1892]
    - Genus †Prepoplanops Carlini, Brandoni & Dal Molin 2013
    - Genus †Pseudoglyptodon Engelmann 1987
    - Family †Rathymotheriidae Ameghino 1904
      - Genus †Rathymotherium Ameghino 1904
    - Clade †Mylodonta McKenna & Bell 1997
      - Genus †Baraguatherium Rincón et al. 2016
      - Genus †Eionaletherium Rincón et al. 2015
      - Genus †Pseudoprepotherium Hoffstetter 1961
      - Family †Orophodontidae Ameghino 1895 [Octodontobradyinae Santos, Rancy & Ferigolo 1993]
        - Subfamily †Orophodontinae
          - Genus †Proplatyarthrus Ameghino 1905
          - Genus †Orophodon Ameghino 1895
        - Subfamily †Octodontotheriinae Hoffstetter 1954
          - Genus †Octodontotherium Ameghino 1895
          - Genus †Octomylodon Ameghino 1904
          - Genus †Octodontobradys Santos, Rancy & Ferigolo 1993
      - Family †Scelidotheriidae Ameghino 1889 [Nematheridae Mercerat 1891]
        - Subfamily †Chubutheriinae Scillato-Yané 1977
          - Genus †Chubutherium Cattoi 1962
        - Subfamily †Scelidotheriinae Ameghino 1889
          - Genus †Sibyllotherium Scillato-Yane & Carlini 1998
          - Genus †Scelidotheriops Ameghino 1904
          - Genus †Analcitherium Ameghino 1891
          - Genus †Elassotherium Cabrera 1939
          - Tribe †Nematheriini
            - Genus †Nematherium Ameghino 1887 [Ammotherium Ameghino 1891; Lymodon Ameghino 1891]
          - Tribe †Scelidotheriini
            - Genus †Proscelidodon Bordas 1935
            - Genus †Catonyx Ameghino 1891 [Platyonyx Lund 1840 non Schoenherr 1826; Scelidodon Ameghino 1881; Scelidotherium (Catonyx) Ameghino 1891]
            - Genus †Neonematherium Ameghino 1904
            - Genus †Scelidotherium Owen 1839 [Spenodon Lund 1839; Sphenodontherium Trouessart 1905; Matschieella Poche 1904; (Scelidodon) Ameghino 1889; (Scelidotheridium) Kraglievich 1934]
      - Family †Mylodontidae Gill 1872
        - Genus †Mirandabradys
        - Genus †Paraglossotherium Esteban 1993
        - Genus †Urumacotherium Bocquentin-Villanueva 1983
        - Subfamily †Mylodontinae Gill 1872
          - Genus †Glossotheriopsis Scillato-Yané 1976
          - Genus †Promylodon Ameghino 1883
          - Genus †Strabosodon Ameghino 1891
          - Genus †Megabradys Scillato-Yané 1981
          - Genus †Pleurolestodon Rovereto 1914
          - Genus †Mylodon Owen 1839 [Gnathopsis Leidy 1852; Grypotherium Reinhardt 1879; Quatriodon Ameghino 1881; Mesodon Ameghino 1882 non Rafinesque 1821 non Wagner 1851; Tetrodon Ameghino 1882 non Linnaeus 1766; Glossotherium non Owen 1839]
        - Subfamily †Lestodontinae Ameghino 1889
          - Genus †Bolivartherium
          - Tribe †Thinobadistini McKenna & Bell 1997
            - Genus †Thinobadistes Hay 1919
            - Genus †Sphenotherus Ameghino 1891
          - Tribe †Lestodontini Ameghino 1889
            - Genus †Lestodon Gervais 1855 [Plioganphiodon Ameghino 1884; Prolestodon Kraglievich 1932]
            - Genus †Lestodontidion Roselli 1976
          - Tribe †Glossotheriini McKenna & Bell 1997
            - Genus †Acremylodon Mones 1986 [Stenodon Frailey 1986 non (sic) Ameghino 1885 non Lesson 1842 non Rafinesque 1818 non Van Beneden 1865]
            - Genus †Ranculcus Ameghino 1891
            - Genus †Glossotherium Owen 1839 [Eumylodon Ameghino 1904; Pseudolestodon Gervais & Ameghino 1880; Laniodon Ameghino 1881; Interodon Ameghino 1885; Nephotherium Ameghino 1886; Glossotheridium Kraglievich 1934; (Oreomylodon) Hoffstetter 1949]
            - Genus †Mylodonopsis Cartelle 1991
            - Genus †Paramylodon Brown 1903 [Orycterotherium Harlan 1841 non Bronn 1838; Eubradys Leidy 1853]
    - Clade Megatheria McKenna & Bell 1997
      - Family †Megalonychidae Gervais 1855 [Choloepidae Pocock 1924]
      - Family †Megatheriidae Gray 1821 [Schismotheridae Mercerat 1891]
      - Family †Nothrotheriidae Ameghino 1920 sensu de Muizon, McDonald, Salas & Urbina 2004

==== Order Pholidota ====
Eocene–Recent

- Genus †Arcticanodon Rose, Eberle & McKenna 2004
- Genus †Melaniella Fox 1984
- Family †Escavadodontidae Rose & Lucas 2000
  - Genus †Escavadodon Rose & Lucas 2000
- Family †Epoicotheriidae Simpson 1927
  - Genus †Amelotabes Rose 1978
  - Genus †Alocodontulum Rose, Bown & Simons 1978 [Alocodon Rose, Bown & Simons 1977 non Thulborn 1973]
  - Genus †Auroratherium Tong & Wamg 1997
  - Genus †Pentapassalus Gazin 1952
  - Genus †Dipassalus Rose, Krishtalka & Stucky 1991
  - Genus †Tetrapassalus Simpson 1959a
  - Genus †Epoicotherium Simpson 1927 [Xenotherium Douglass 1906 non Ameghino 1904; Pseudochrysochloris Turnbull & Reed 1967]
  - Genus †Tubulodon Jepsen 1932
  - Genus †Xenocranium Colbert 1942
- Family †Metacheiromyidae Wortman 1903
  - Genus †Propalaeanodon Rose 1979
  - Genus †Palaeanodon Matthew 1918
  - Genus †Brachianodon Gunnell & Gingerich 1993
  - Genus †Mylanodon Secord et al. 2002
  - Genus †Metacheiromys Wortman 1903
- Suborder Pholidota Weber 1904 sensu stricto [Manidae Gray 1821 sensu lato] (pangolins/scaly anteaters)
  - Genus †Argyromanis Ameghino 1904
  - Genus †Orthoarthrus Ameghino 1904
  - Genus †Euromanis Gaudin, Emry & Wible 2009
  - Family †Eurotamanduidae Szalay & Schrenk 1994
    - Genus †Eurotamandua Storch 1978
  - Infraorder Eupholidota Gaudin, Emry & Wible 2009
    - Family †Eomanidae Storch 2003
      - Genus †Eomanis Storch 1978
    - Superfamily Manoidea
      - Genus †Necromanis Filhol 1893 [Leptomanis Filhol 1893; Necrodasypus Filhol 1893; Teutomanis Ameghino 1905; Galliaetatus Ameghino 1905]
      - Family †Patriomanidae Szalay & Schrenk 1998 sensu Gaudin, Emry & Pogue 2006
        - Genus †Patriomanis Emry 1970
        - Genus †Cryptomanis Gaudin, Emry & Pogue 2006
      - Family Manidae Gray 1821

==== Infraorder Cetacea ====
Eocene–Recent

Parvorder Archaeoceti

- Family Raoellidae
  - Genus Indohyus
- Family Pakicetidae
  - Genus Pakicetus
    - Pakicetus inachus
  - Genus Gandakasia
  - Genus Nalacetus
  - Genus Ichthyolestes
- Family Ambulocetidae
  - Genus Ambulocetus
  - Genus Himalayacetus
- Family Remingtonocetidae
  - Genus Kutchicetus
- Family Protocetidae
  - Genus Rodhocetus (??? Ma)
    - Rodhocetus kasrani
    - Rodhocetus balochistanensis
  - Genus Protocetus
- Family Dorudontidae
  - Genus Dorudon (40–36 Ma)
    - Dorudon atrox
  - Genus Zygorhiza
- Family Basilosauridae
  - Genus Basilosaurus (40–37 Ma)
    - Basilosaurus cetoides
    - Basilosaurus hussaini
    - Basilosaurus isis

===== Suborder Mysticeti =====
- Family Mammalodontidae
  - Genus Mammalodon
- Family Cetotheriidae
  - Genus Cetotherium
  - Genus Piscobalaena
- Family Janjucetidae
  - Genus Janjucetus

to be sorted

- Genus Eobalaenoptera
  - Eobalaenoptera harrisoni

===== Suborder Odontoceti =====
- Family Squalodontidae
  - Genus Prosqualodon
  - Genus Squalodon (shark tooth dolphin)
- Family Eurhinodelphinidae
  - Genus Eurhinodelphis
- Family Kentriodontidae
  - Genus Kentriodon
- Family Rhabdosteidae
  - Genus Rhabdosteus
- Family Odobenocetopsidae
  - Genus Odobenocetops

==== Order Perissodactyla ====
Eocene–Recent

===== Suborder Hippomorpha =====
- Superfamily Brontotheroidea
  - Family Brontotheriidae
    - See list of brontothere genera
- Superfamily Pachynolophoidea
  - Family Pachynolophidae
- Superfamily Equoidea
  - Family Palaeotheriidae
    - Genus Hyracotherium
    - Genus Propalaeotherium
    - Genus Palaeotherium
  - Family Equidae
    - Genus Miohippus
    - Genus Orohippus
    - Genus Mesohippus
    - Subfamily Anchitheriinae
      - Genus Sinohippus
      - Genus Megahippus
      - Genus Anchitherium
    - Subfamily Equinae
      - Genus Archaeohippus
      - Genus Cormohipparion
      - Genus Eurygnathohippus
      - Genus Hipparion
      - Genus Hippidion
      - Genus Hippotherium
      - Genus Merychippus
      - Genus Parahippus
      - Genus Pliohippus
      - Genus Scaphohippus

===== Suborder Ceratomorpha =====
- Superfamily Rhinocerotoidea
  - Family Amynodontidae (hippo-rhinos)
    - Subfamily Amynodontinae
    - Subfamily Metamynodontinae
      - Genus Metamynodon
  - Family Hyracodontidae (giant rhinos)
    - Subfamily Indricotheriinae
      - Genus Forstercooperia
      - Genus Juxia
      - Genus Benaratherium?
      - Genus Urtinotherium
      - Genus Indricotherium
        - Baluchitherium (Indricotherium transouralicum)
      - Genus Paraceratherium
        - Paraceratherium bugtiense
    - Subfamily Allaceropinae
    - Subfamily Hyracodontinae
      - Genus Hyracodon
  - Family Rhinocerotidae (rhinos)
    - Genus Teleoceras
    - Genus Trigonias
    - Subfamily Rhinocerotinae
      - Genus Rhinoceros
        - Rhinoceros sivalensis
        - Rhinoceros platyrhinus
      - Genus Coelodonta
        - Woolly rhinoceros (Coelodonta antiquitatis)
      - Genus Dicerorhinus (Sumatran rhinoceros)
        - Dicerorhinus leakeyi
    - Subfamily Elasmotheriinae
      - Genus Sinotherium
      - Genus Iranotherium
      - Genus Menoceras
      - Genus Elasmotherium
        - Elasmotherium caucasicum
        - Giant rhinoceros (Elasmotherium sibiricum)
- Superfamily Tapiroidea
  - Genus Hyrachyus
  - Family Helaletidae
    - Genus Lophiodon
  - Family Tapiridae
    - Miotapirus
- Superfamily Chalicotheroidea
  - Family Lophiodontidae
    - Genus Lophiodon
    - Genus Lophiaspis
  - Family Chalicotheriidae
    - Subfamily Chalicotheriinae
      - Genus Chalicotherium
      - Genus Anisodon
      - Genus Nestoritherium
    - Subfamily Schizotheriinae
      - Genus Ancylotherium
      - Genus Borissiakia
      - Genus Chemositia
      - Genus Kalimantsia
      - Genus Limognitherium
      - Genus Moropus
      - Genus Tylocephalonyx

==== Order Artiodactyla ====
Eocene–Recent

===== Suborder Suina =====
- Family Dichobunidae
  - Genus Messelobunodon
  - Genus Diacodexis
- Family Entelodontidae (Entelodonts)
  - Genus Archaeotherium
  - Genus Brachyhyops
  - Genus Paraentelodon
  - Genus Cypretherium
  - Genus Daeodon
  - Genus Eoentelodon
  - Genus Entelodon
  - Genus Dinohyus
- Family Suidae (pigs)
  - Genus Metridiochoerus
  - Genus Kubanochoerus
  - Genus Kolpochoerus
  - Genus Nyanzachoerus
  - Genus Notochoerus
- Family Tayassuidae (peccaries)
  - Genus Platygonus
  - Genus Mylohyus
- Family Oreodontidae (Oreodonts)
  - Genus Promerycochoerus
  - Genus Merycoidodon
  - Genus Brachycrus
  - Genus Leptauchenia
  - Genus Sespia
  - Genus Mesoreodon
  - Genus Miniochoerus
  - Genus Eporeodon
- Family Cainotheriidae
  - Genus Cainotherium
- Family Hippopotamidae (hippopotamii)
  - Genus Archaeopotamus
  - Genus Hippopotamus
    - Hippopotamus gorgops
    - European hippopotamus (Hippopotamus antiquus)
    - Madagascan hippo (Hippopotamus madagascariensis)
    - Madagascan dwarf hippo (Hippopotamus lemerlei)
    - Cretan dwarf hippopotamus (Hippopotamus creutzburgi)
    - Maltese hippopotamus (Hippopotamus melitensis)
    - Sicilian hippopotamus (Hippopotamus pentlandi)
  - Genus Hexaprotodon
    - Hexaprotodon harvardi
    - Madagascan pygmy hippo (Hexaprotodon madagascariensis)
  - Genus Phanourios
    - Cyprus dwarf hippopotamus (Phanourios minutus)
  - Genus Kenyapotamus
- Family Anthracotheriidae
  - Genus Elomeryx
  - Genus Bothriogenys
  - Genus Bothriodon
  - Genus Anthracotherium
  - Genus Libycosaurus
  - Genus Merycopotamus

===== Suborder Tylopoda =====
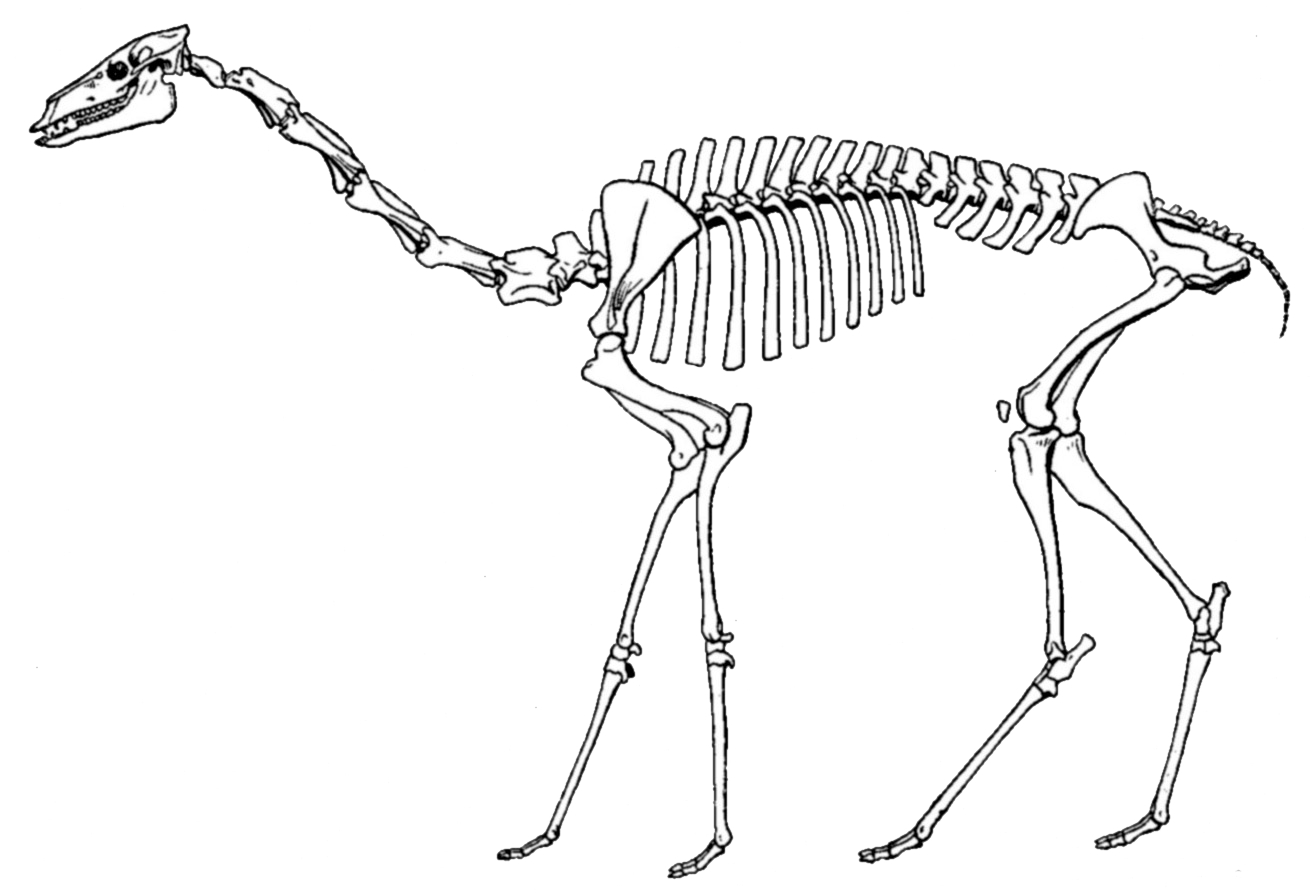
Oxydactylus

- Family Camelidae (camels)
  - Genus Aepycamelus (Miocene)
  - Genus Camelops (Pliocene – Pleistocene)
  - Genus Camelus
    - Camelus gigas
    - Camelus hesternus
    - Syrian camel
    - Camelus sivalensis
  - Genus Oxydactylus
  - Genus Poebrotherium
  - Genus Procamelus (Miocene)
  - Genus Stenomylus
  - Genus Titanotylopus (Miocene – Pleistocene)
- Family Oromerycidae
  - Genus Protylopus

===== Suborder Ruminantia =====
- Family Protoceratidae
  - Genus Protoceras
  - Genus Syndyoceras
  - Genus Synthetoceras
  - Genus Kyptoceras
  - Genus Pseudoprotoceras
- Family Climacoceratidae
  - Genus Climacoceras
  - Genus Prolibytherium
    - Prolibytherium magnieri (Miocene)
  - Genus Orangemeryx
- Family Tragulidae (chevrotains)
  - Genus Dorcatherium
  - Genus Dorcabune
  - Genus Siamotragulus
  - Genus Yunnanotherium
- Family Giraffidae (giraffes)
  - Genus Eumeryx (Oligocene)
  - Genus Palaeotragus
    - Palaeotragus primaevus (Miocene)
    - Palaeotragus germaini (Miocene)
  - Genus Samotherium (Miocene–Pliocene)
    - Samotherium boissieri (Pliocene)
  - Genus Sivatherium
    - Sivatherium giganteum (Pleistocene)
    - Sivatherium maurusium (Pleistocene)
  - Genus Bohlinia (Miocene)
    - Bohlinia attica (synonym: Giraffa attica)
  - Genus Bramatherium
  - Genus Giraffokeryx
  - Genus Helladotherium
  - Genus Honanotherium
  - Genus Libytherium
  - Genus Mitilanotherium
  - Genus Shansitherium
  - Genus Okapia (okapis)
    - Okapia stillei (Pleistocene)
  - Genus Giraffa (giraffes)
    - Giraffa punjabiensis (Pliocene)
    - Giraffa priscilla (Pliocene)
    - Giraffa jumae (Pleistocene)
    - Giraffa gracilis (Pleistocene)
    - Giraffa sivalensis (Pleistocene)
- Family Leptomerycidae
  - Genus Leptomeryx
- Family Archaeomerycidae
  - Genus Archaeomeryx
- Family Palaeomerycidae
  - Genus Ampelomeryx
  - Genus Cranioceras
  - Genus Pediomeryx
  - Genus Triceromeryx
- Family Hoplitomerycidae
  - Genus Hoplitomeryx
- Family Moschidae (musk deers)
  - Genus Blastomeryx
  - Genus Longirostromeryx
- Family Cervidae (deer)
  - Subfamily Muntiacinae (muntjacs)
    - Genus Dicrocerus
    - Genus Heteroprox
  - Subfamily Cervinae
    - Genus Candiacervus
      - Candiacervus ropalophorus
      - Candiacervus major
      - Candiacervus pygadiensìs
      - Candiacervus cretensis
    - Genus Megaloceros
      - Irish elk (Megaloceros giganteus) (died ~5700 BC)
    - Genus Eucladoceros
    - Genus Sinomegaceros
  - Subfamily Capreolinae
      - Alces carnutorum (Carnute elk)
    - Genus Navahoceros
      - American mountain deer Navahoceros fricki
    - Genus Libralces
    - Genus Odocoileus
      - Odocoileus lucasi
    - Genus Cervalces
      - Stag-moose Cervalces scotti
- Family Antilocapridae (pronghorns)
  - Genus Capromeryx
    - Capromeryx minor
  - Genus Hayoceros
  - Genus Ilingoceros
  - Genus Cosoryx
  - Genus Meryceros
  - Genus Merycodus
  - Genus Paracosoryx
  - Genus Ramoceros
  - Genus Submeryceros
  - Genus Proantilocapra
  - Genus Osbornoceros
  - Genus Ottoceros
  - Genus Plioceros
  - Genus Sphenophalos
  - Genus Ceratomeryx
  - Genus Hexameryx
  - Genus Hexobelomeryx
  - Genus Stockoceros
  - Genus Tetrameryx
  - Genus Texoceros
  - Genus Antilocapra
    - Antilocapra maquinensis
- Family Bovidae (Bovids)
  - Subfamily Bovinae
    - Genus Bos
      - Bos acutifrons
      - Bos planifrons
      - Aurochs (Bos primigenius) (died 1627)
    - Genus Bison
      - Ancient bison (Bison antiquus)
      - Steppe wisent (Bison priscus) (died Late Pleistocene)
      - Giant bison (Bison latifrons)
      - Bison occidentalis
      - Bison sivalensis
    - Genus Probison
    - Genus Bubalus
      - Bubalus cebuensis
    - Genus Pelorovis
    - Genus Eotragus
    - Genus Kipsigicerus
    - Genus Leptobos
  - Subfamily Alcelaphinae
    - Genus Megalotragus
    - Genus Parmularius
  - Subfamily Antilopinae
    - Genus Gazella
      - Gazella psolea
      - Gazella borbonica
      - Gazella deperdita
      - Gazella gaudryi
      - Gazella triquetrucornis
  - Subfamily Caprinae
    - Genus Bootherium
      - Harlan's muskox Bootherium bombifrons
    - Genus Capra
      - Capra dalii
    - Genus Euceratherium
      - Shrub-ox Euceratherium collinum
    - Genus Myotragus
      - Cave goat Myotragus balearicus
    - Genus Oioceros

== See also ==
- List of placental mammals (living species)
- List of monotremes and marsupials (living species)
