= Clallam Formation =

Geologic formation in Washington, U.S.

- Stratigraphic range: Late Oligocene-early Miocene
- Type: Formation
- Underlies: Quinault Formation
- Overlies: Pysht Formation

Lithology
- Primary: Sandstone, conglomerate, shale
- Other: Coal

Location
- Region: Washington (state)
- Country: United States

Type section
- Named for: Clallam County, Washington

The Clallam Formation is a geologic formation in Washington (state). It preserves marine fossils dating back to the late Oligocene and early Miocene period. It outcrops on the northern Olympic Peninsula and along parts of the Strait of Juan de Fuca.

== Vertebrate paleobiota ==
=== Mammals ===
Mammals of the Clallam Formation
Genus	Species	Stratigraphy	Material	Notes	Images
Desmostylus	D. hesperus	Aquitanian		A desmostylian.	
Kolponomos	K. clallamensis	Aquitanian		An amphicynodont pan-pinniped. Type locality of genus and species.	
aff. Kronokotherium	K. sp.	Aquitanian		A desmostylian.	
Squalodelphinidae indet.		Aquitanian		A squalodelphinid toothed whale.	
Squaloziphius	S. emlongi	Aquitanian		A squaloziphiid toothed whale. Type locality of genus and species.	

== See also ==
- List of fossiliferous stratigraphic units in Washington (state)
- Paleontology in Washington (state)
