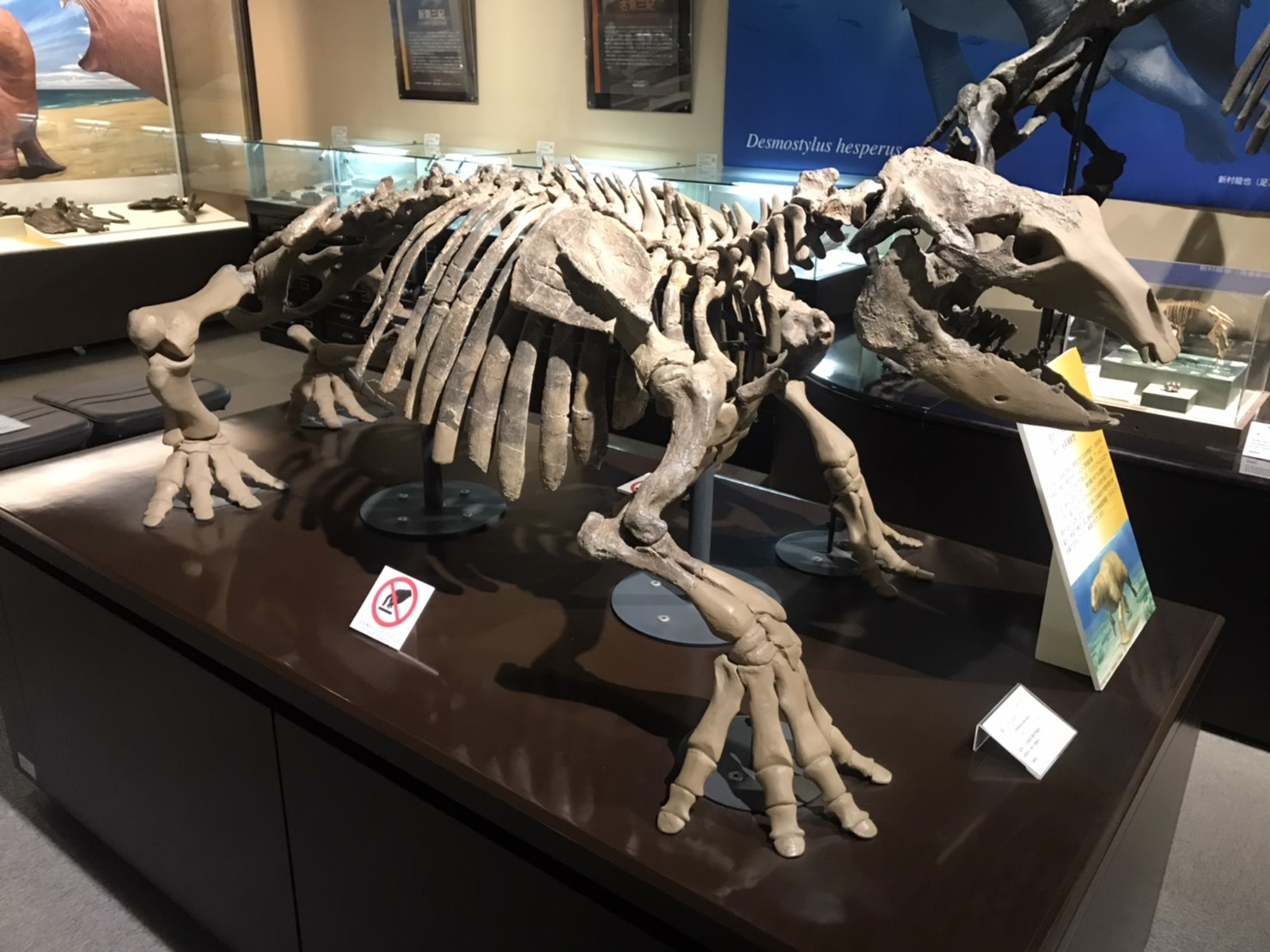
- Mounted skeleton in Hokkaido University Museum

Scientific classification
- Kingdom: Animalia
- Phylum: Chordata
- Class: Mammalia
- Order: †Desmostylia
- Family: †Paleoparadoxiidae
- Genus: †Ashoroa; Inuzuka, 2000
- Species: †A. laticosta

Binomial name
- †Ashoroa laticosta Inuzuka, 2000

= Ashoroa =

Ashoroa Temporal range: Chattian ~28–23 Ma

Species of mammal (fossil)

Ashoroa (named after its type locality Ashoro, Hokkaido) is an extinct genus of desmostylian, aquatic, herbivorous mammal. Fossils of Ashoroa have been found in the Morawan Formation on Hokkaido, Japan (43.3°N 143.8°E, paleocoordinates 44.6°N 141.4°E) and were dated to the late Oligocene.

== Description ==
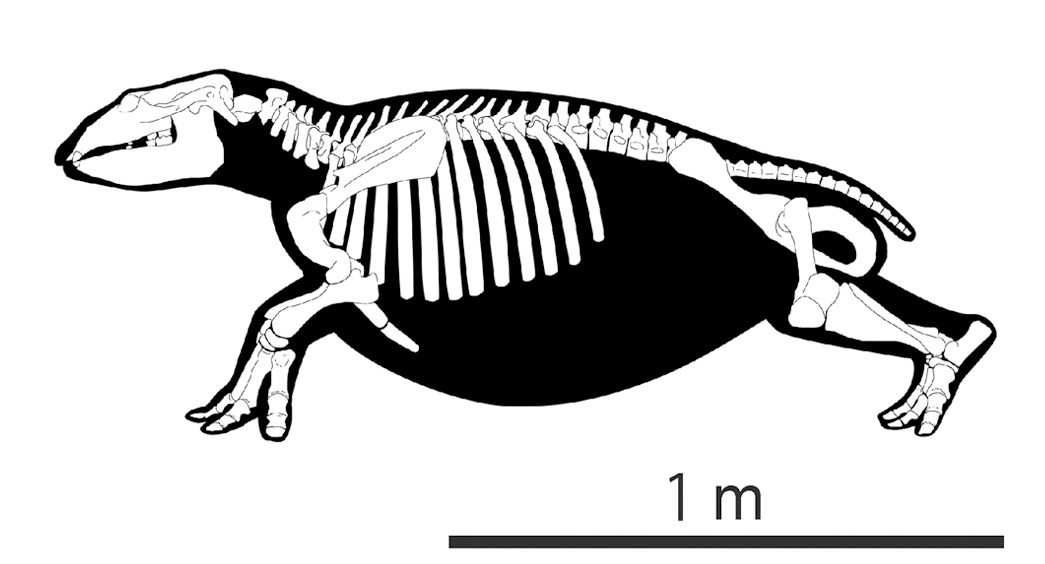
Skeletal diagram

Ashoroa is the smallest and one of the oldest desmostylians with an estimated body length of 168 cm (66 in). It is known from a rib, a humerus, a femur, and three vertebrae of the single species and holotype, Ashoroa laticosta.

Ashoroa had pachyosteosclerotic (large and dense) bones. The ribs are broader than in other desmostylians, similar to sirenian ribs, and very dense, like those of Behemotops and Paleoparadoxia; and extant, semi-aquatic mammals such as Eurasian beaver and hippopotamus, but not as dense as in sirenians. The recovered long bones lack inner cavities, like in Paleoparadoxia and Desmostylus, and the trabecular pattern is different from that in Behemotops.

Hayashi et al. 2013 interpreted Ashoroa, together with Behemotops and Paleoparadoxia. as a "shallow water swimmer, either hovering slowly at a preferred depth, or walking on the bottom".

== Bibliography ==
- Inuzuka, N. (2000). "Primitive late Oligocene desmostylians from Japan and Phylogeny of the Desmostylia". Bulletin of the Ashoro Museum of Paleontology. 1: 91–123.
- Hayashi, Shoji; Houssaye, Alexandra; Nakajima, Yasuhisa; Kentaro, Chiba; Ando, Tatsuro; Sawamura, Hiroshi; Inuzuka, Norihisa; Kaneko, Naotomo; Osaki, Tomohiro (2013). "Bone Inner Structure Suggests Increasing Aquatic Adaptations in Desmostylia (Mammalia, Afrotheria)". PLOS ONE. 8 (4) e59146. Bibcode:2013PLoSO...859146H. doi:10.1371/journal.pone.0059146. OCLC 837402105. PMC 3615000. PMID 23565143.
