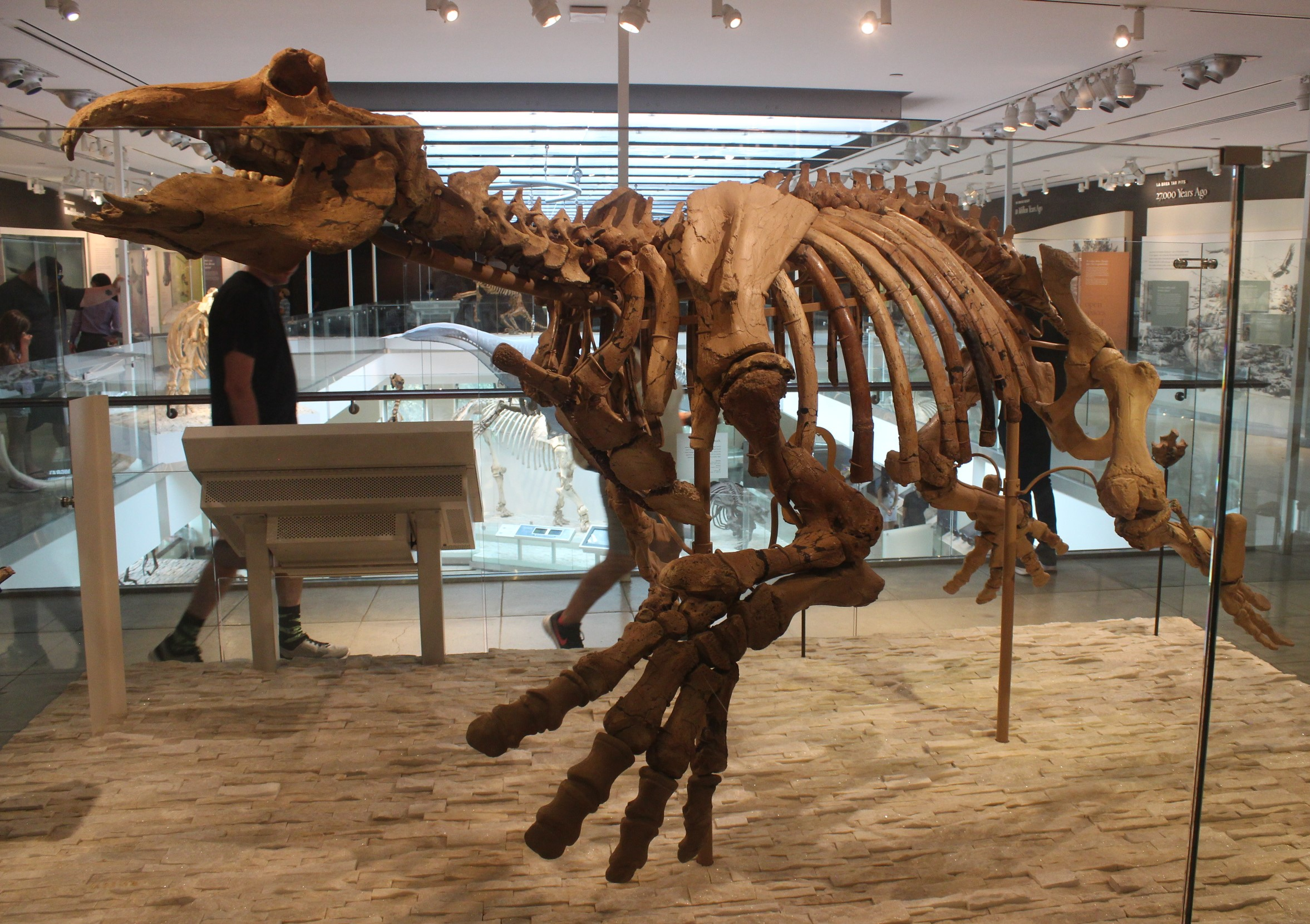
- N. cecilialina holotype at the Natural History Museum of Los Angeles County.

Scientific classification
- Kingdom: Animalia
- Phylum: Chordata
- Class: Mammalia
- Infraclass: Placentalia
- Order: †Desmostylia
- Family: †Paleoparadoxiidae
- Genus: †Neoparadoxia; Barnes, 2013

Type species
- †Neoparadoxia cecilialina Barnes, 2013

Species
- N. cecilialina Barnes, 2013; N. repenningi (Domning and Barnes, 2007)

= Neoparadoxia =

Neoparadoxia Temporal range: Miocene

Extinct genus of desmostylian mammal

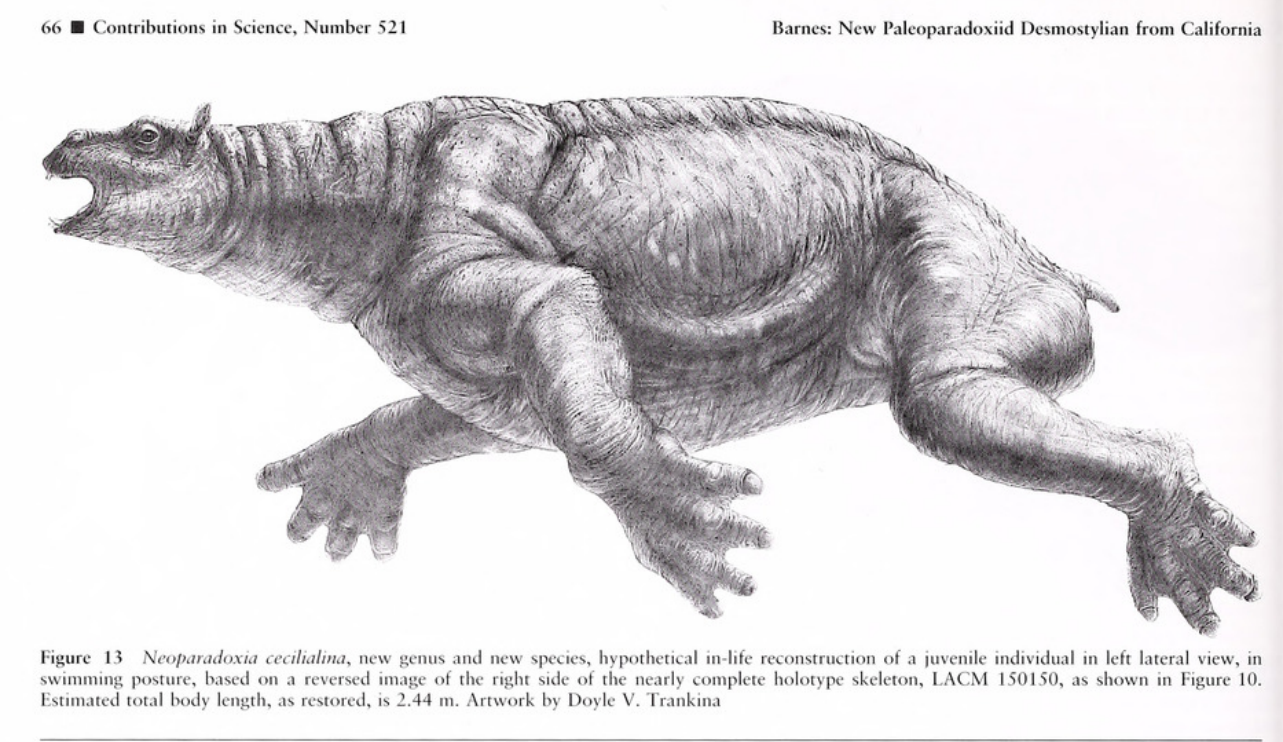
Life reconstruction of a young Neoparadoxia.

Neoparadoxia is an extinct genus of large, herbivorous aquatic desmostylian mammals from the Miocene Ladera and Monterey Formations of North America.The name comes from the Latin "Neo", meaning new, and Paleoparadoxia, a related genus of desmostylian.

== Description ==
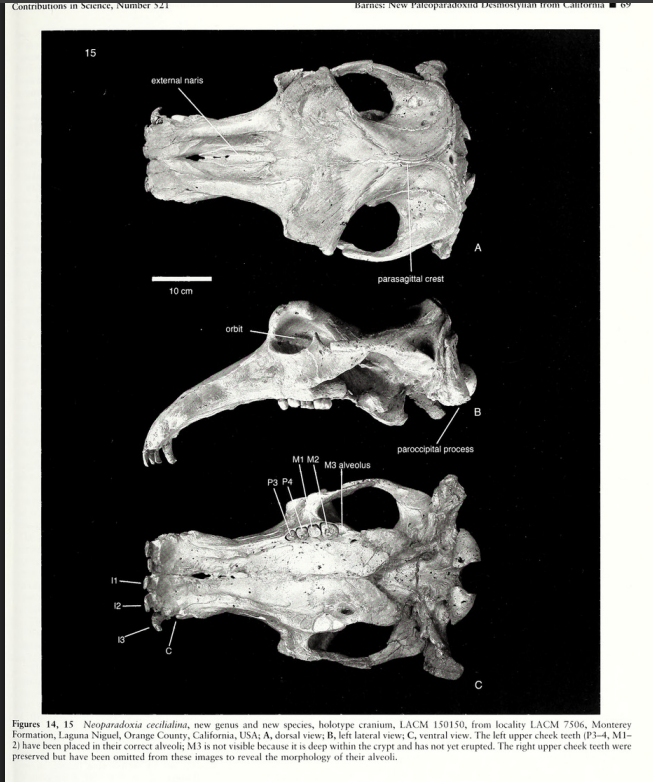
Cranium of the holotype of Neoparadoxia.

Neoparadoxia has thicker tooth enamel than other desmostylian genera. The genus also has high-crowned molars, with extra cusps. The first and second premolars are also proportionally larger. Neoparadoxia bears 3 pairs of mesosterna (as opposed to the typical 4). The humeral morphology is similar to other paleoparadoxiids, with a thick shaft. The body size of Neoparadoxia is speculated to be larger than other desmostylians, with species varying in length from 2.2 meters to 2.73 meters. Like other desmostylians, Neoparadoxia was primarily aquatic, though controversial research has suggested it was capable of some terrestrial locomotion. The genus is suggested to have moved like chalicotheres whilst on land, though this is unlikely.

== Classification ==
Neoparadoxia is grouped within the family Paleoparadoxiidae, alongside the related genera Archaeoparadoxia and Paleoparadoxia.

Phylogeny of Paleoparadoxiidae, according to Barnes (2013);

- Behemotops
- - Archaeoparadoxia
  - - Paleoparadoxia
    - Neoparadoxia
