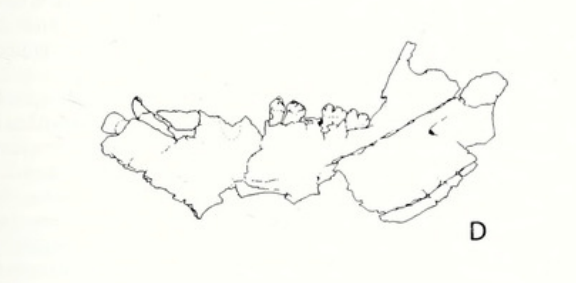
- Holotype mandible of A. weltoni

Scientific classification
- Kingdom: Animalia
- Phylum: Chordata
- Class: Mammalia
- Order: †Desmostylia
- Family: †Paleoparadoxiidae
- Genus: †Archaeoparadoxia; Barnes, 2013

Species
- A. weltoni (Clark, 1991)

Synonyms
- Paleoparadoxia weltoni

= Archaeoparadoxia =

Archaeoparadoxia Temporal range: 24–23 Ma Late Oligocene-Early Miocene

Genus of desmostylian mammal

Archaeoparadoxia is a genus of desmostylian mammal from late Oligocene California. The name derives from the Archaic Greek "archaio" (meaning "from the beginning") and the name of another genus of desmostylian, Paleoparadoxia.

== Description ==
Archaeoparadoxia is relatively small compared to other desmostylians. The limb bones are gracile, and the cranium is small. The holotype specimen is of a subadult, but it is speculated the individual was near adult size. Incisor morphology of Archaeoparadoxia differs from that of Paleoparadoxia and Neoparadoxia, as they are not flattened dorsoventrally.

== Classification ==
Archaeoparadoxia is considered to be close to other paleoparadoxiids, such as Neoparadoxia and Paleoparadoxia. Archaeoparadoxia was originally considered a species of Paleoparadoxia, P. weltoni, but the species was split on morphological grounds.

Phylogeny of Paleoparadoxiidae in accordance with Barnes (2011);

- Behemotops
- - Archaeoparadoxia
  - - Paleoparadoxia
    - Neoparadoxia
