= Kronokotherium =

Kronokotherium Temporal range: Miocene

Scientific classification
- Kingdom: Animalia
- Phylum: Chordata
- Class: Mammalia
- Order: †Desmostylia
- Family: †Desmostylidae
- Genus: †Kronokotherium; Pronina 1957

Type species
- †Kronokotherium brevimaxillare Pronina 1957

Extinct genus of mammals

Kronokotherium is an extinct herbivorous marine mammal of the family Desmostylidae in the order Desmostylia.

Its type locality is Raktinskaya, Kamchatka Peninsula, Russia (55.0°N 161.6°E, paleocoordinates 55.7°N 163.0°E).

Kronokotherium was made a separate genus because the specimen differs from Desmostylus in the arrangement of the major molar cusps and its smaller size, but it has been synonymized with Desmostylus by most authors.
