= Ounalashkastylus =

Ounalashkastylus Temporal range: Miocene

Scientific classification
- Kingdom: Animalia
- Phylum: Chordata
- Class: Mammalia
- Infraclass: Placentalia
- Order: †Desmostylia
- Family: †Desmostylidae
- Genus: †Ounalashkastylus; Chiba et al., 2016
- Species: †O. tomidai

Binomial name
- †Ounalashkastylus tomidai Chiba et al., 2016

Extinct genus of mammals

Ounalashkastylus is an extinct genus of desmostylian that lived in Alaska during the Miocene epoch. It is known from a single species, Ounalashkastylus tomidai.
