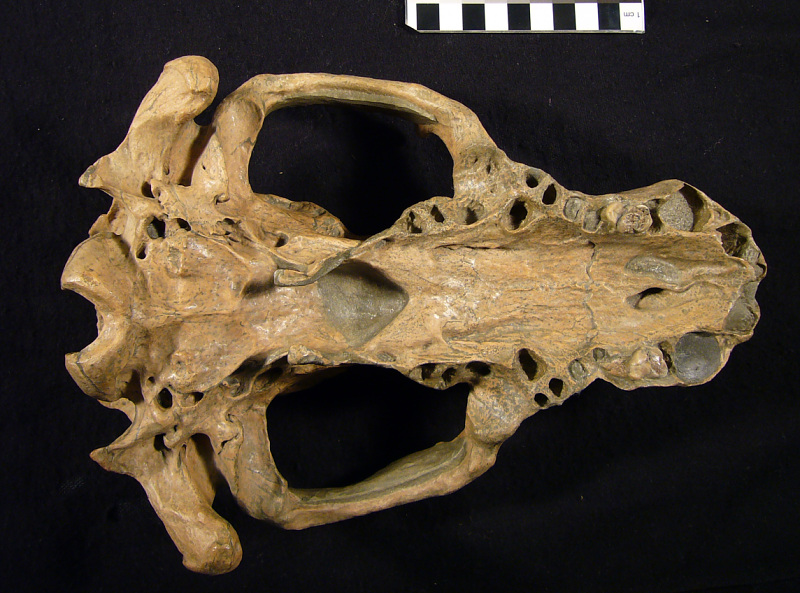
- Skull
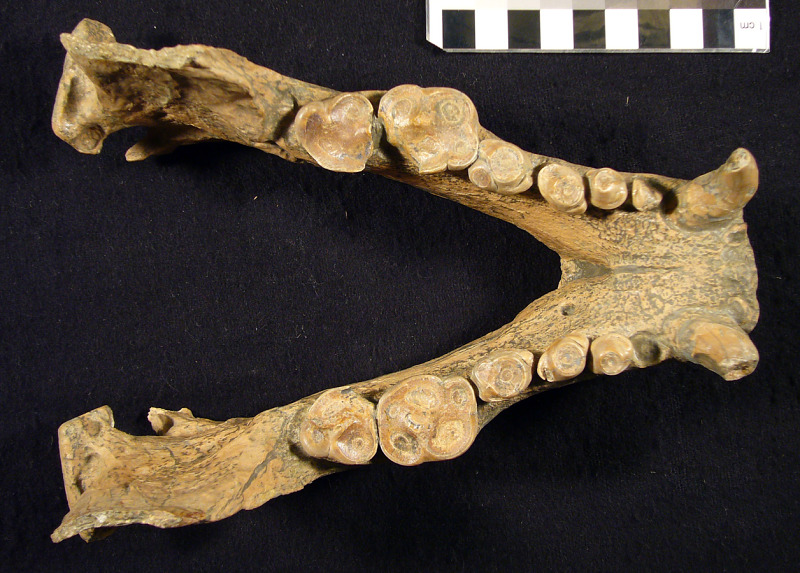
- Mandible

Scientific classification
- Kingdom: Animalia
- Phylum: Chordata
- Class: Mammalia
- Order: Carnivora
- Family: †Amphicynodontidae
- Genus: †Kolponomos; Stirton, 1960

Species
- K. clallamensis Stirton, 1960; K. newportensis Tedford et al., 1994

= Kolponomos =

Kolponomos Temporal range: Early Miocene

Extinct genus of mammals

Kolponomos is an extinct genus of carnivoran mammal that existed in the Late Arikareean North American Land Mammal Age, early Miocene epoch, about 20 million years ago. It was likely a marine mammal. The genus was erected in 1960 by Ruben A. Stirton, a paleontologist at the University of California Museum of Paleontology, Berkeley, for the species K. clallamensis, on the basis of a partial skull and jaw found on the Clallam Formation of the Olympic Peninsula. At the time, Stirton questionably assigned it to Procyonidae, its systematic position remained problematic until the discovery of more fossils including a nearly complete cranium from the original locality of K. clallamensis which helped identify it as part of the group from which pinnipeds evolved.

== Description ==
In life, species of Kolponomos had downturned snouts and broad, heavy molars that would have been suited to a diet of hard-shelled marine invertebrates, and their narrow snouts and anteriorly directed eyes indicate that they would have had stereoscopic vision. Large neck muscle attachments and robust foot bones combine with these features to suggest that Kolponomos filled a unique niche among marine carnivores, approached today only by the very distantly related sea otter. Due to the lack of a complete skeleton, however, it is difficult to make inferences about this genus' other adaptations.

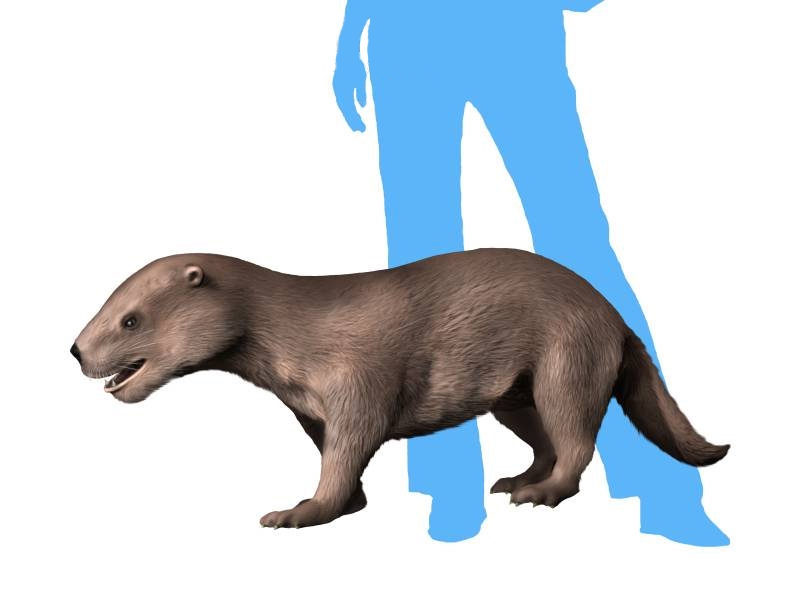
An artist's restoration of an otter-like K. newportensis compared to a human

Based on the skull and jaws known, Kolponomos convergently evolved mandibular and bite features that had similarities to extant bears, sea otters, and even the sabretooth Smilodon. The anterior portion of the jaw becomes a functional anchoring fulcrum in both Kolponomos and Smilodon. Although dental morphology and heavy occlusal wear patterns are shared with the sea otter. Kolponomos' dentition was less efficient but exhibited higher stiffness than in the sea otter. Riley Black wrote that Kolponomos “bit like a sabrecat, crunched like a bear”.

Aspects of its feeding morphology were similar to the giant otter Siamogale melilutra, although Kolponomos is not an otter

== Discovery ==
Kolponomos clallamensis is known from the Miocene of Slip Point Lighthouse, Washington (48.3°N 124.2°W, paleocoordinates 48.0°N 116.9°W), from the Aquitanian-aged Clallam Formation. The species was originally based on a rostrum found in 1957 at Slip Point in Clallam Bay, Washington. A nearly complete cranium was found at the same location in 1988. Both K. clallamensis and K. newportensis are associated with the late Arikareean NALMA.

Kolponomos newportensis was described in 1994 by R. Tedford, L. Barnes and Clayton E. Ray from the Burdigalian-aged Nye Formation of Oregon. It is represented by single specimen: a nearly complete skull, jaw and post-cranial bones found in a concretion of sediment. The concretion was discovered in two pieces by fossil collector Douglas Emlong near Newport, Oregon, the first in 1969 and the second, eight years later, in 1977. Because the concretion had been hardened so much by tectonic stress, the paleontological laboratory at the Smithsonian Institution considered them "the most difficult materials ever encountered by our laboratory.," and a combination of techniques proved essential to its extraction and preparation, which lasted two decades. Discovery of K. newportensis disproved the earlier hypothesis that the genus was related to the ancestors of raccoons, and instead was a stem-pinniped.
