= Roy Herbert Reinhart =

American paleontologist

- Born: 1919
- Died: 2005; Oxford, Ohio
- Occupation: Paleontologist
- Spouse: Betty
- Children: Johanna, Jan, William

Roy Herbert Reinhart (born September 11, 1919, died December 11, 2005 Oxford, Ohio) was a zoologist, geologist, and paleontologist. He is especially remembered for his research on Sirenia and the discovery of the order Desmostylia.

== Life ==
Reinhart earned his B.S. at Miami University, Oxford, Ohio, in 1941. He met is wife, Betty J. (née Whitesell) while an undergraduate student at Miami.

During WW2, Reinhart served as lieutenant Combat Engineer in Patton's Third army and took part in the Liberation of Paris, the Battle of the Bulge, the Crossing of the Rhine, and the liberation of Buchenwald.

After the war, he founded the Department of Geology at West Texas State College before returning to Miami as a teacher in paleontology. He discovered and described the order Desmostylia, a group of marine mammals, in 1959.

He was rewarded twice as an author; the AK Morris Award in 1991 and the John Dolibois Award in 1994. In 1991, he donated 44 acres (18 ha) of land to Miami University, now known as the Reinhart Reserve.

Throughout his life, Reinhart was an active cross country runner and a published cartoonist. Except his interest in fossils of all kind, he also assembled one of the finest collections of mound builder relics in the US.

Reinhart had a brother, a sister, two daughters, one son, three grandchildren, and five great-grandchildren. He and his wife were named Parents of the Year in 1972. He died in December 2005 after a brief illness.

== Bibliography ==
- Reinhart, Roy H. (February 1951). "A new genus of sea cow from the Miocene of Colombia". Bulletin of the Department of Geological Sciences, University of California. 28 (9): 203–213. LCCN 51009203. OCLC 6081510.
- Reinhart, Roy H. (1951). Collected papers. OCLC 25988747.
- Reinhart, Roy H. (1951). "A new shark of the family Ptychodontidae from South America". Bulletin of the Department of Geological Sciences. 28 (8): 195–201. LCCN a51009237. OCLC 6081404.
- Reinhart, Roy H. (March 1953). "Diagnosis of the new mammalian order, Desmostylia". J. Geol. 61 (2): 187. Bibcode:1953JG.....61..187R. doi:10.1086/626067. S2CID 140701802.
- Reinhart, Roy H. (July 1959). "A review of the Sirenia and Desmostylia". University of California Publications in Geological Sciences. 36 (1): 1–146. LCCN a59009804. OCLC 3474601. (thesis)
- Reinhart, Roy H. (1960). "[Review of] Prehistoric Man in Europe". Ethnohistory. 7 (2): 196–198. doi:10.2307/480761. JSTOR 480761. OCLC 4892416450.
- Reinhart, Roy H.; Bever, James Edward (1961). Introductory geology: laboratory manual. Dubuque, Iowa: Wm. C. Brown. OCLC 20770763.
- Reinhart, Roy H. (1970a). "Desmostylia". In Gray, P. (ed.). The encyclopedia of the biological sciences (2nd ed.). New York: Van Nostrand Reinhold. p. 243.
- Reinhart, Roy H. (1970b). "Sirenia". In Gray, P. (ed.). The encyclopedia of the biological sciences (2nd ed.). New York: Van Nostrand Reinhold. pp. 854–855.
- Reinhart, Roy H. (October 1971). Fossil Sirenia of Florida. The Plaster Jacket. Florida State Museum, University of Florida. pp. 1–10. OCLC 33438006.
- Reinhart, Roy H. (1975). "New discoveries in the Order Desmostylia". Am. Zool. 15 (3): 826.
- Reinhart, Roy H. (July 1976). "Fossil Sirenians and Desmostylids from Florida and elsewhere". Bulletin of the Florida State Museum, Biological Sciences. 20 (4): 187–300. LCCN 77620824. OCLC 2847544.
- Reinhart, Roy H. (1982). "The extinct mammalian order Desmostylia". Natl. Geogr. Soc. Res. Repts. 14: 549–555.
- Hulbert, Richard C. Jr.; Reinhart, Roy H.; Morgan, Gary Scott; Pratt, Ann E. (2001). "Sirenians". In Hulbert, R. C. Jr. (ed.). The fossil vertebrates of Florida. Gainesville: University Press of Florida. pp. 322–330. OCLC 43929789.
