= Squaloziphius =

Squaloziphius Temporal range: Early Miocene, 23–20 Ma

Scientific classification
- Domain: Eukaryota
- Kingdom: Animalia
- Phylum: Chordata
- Class: Mammalia
- Order: Artiodactyla
- Infraorder: Cetacea
- Family: †Squaloziphiidae
- Genus: †Squaloziphius; Muizon, 1991
- Species: †S. emlongi

Binomial name
- †Squaloziphius emlongi Muizon, 1991

Extinct genus of cetaceans

Squaloziphius is an extinct genus of odontocete cetacean from the Early Miocene (Aquitanian)-aged Clallam Formation of Washington state.

== Systematics ==
It was originally classified as the most primitive beaked whale, being placed in a separate subfamily, Squaloziphiinae, (followed by Fordyce and Muizon 2001) but later authors have placed it outside Ziphiidae as either Odontoceti incertae sedis or closely related to Ziphiidae. The description of the archaic odontocete Yaquinacetus demonstrated that Squaloziphius was by no means part of Ziphiidae and that these two taxa are more primitive than crown Odontoceti, necessitating elevation of Squaloziphiinae to full familial status, as Squaloziphiidae.
