= Yaquinacetus =

Yaquinacetus Temporal range: 24.1–99.6 Ma

Scientific classification
- Kingdom: Animalia
- Phylum: Chordata
- Class: Mammalia
- Order: Artiodactyla
- Infraorder: Cetacea
- Family: †Squaloziphiidae
- Genus: †Yaquinacetus; Lambert et al., 2019

Genus of whales

Yaquinacetus is a genus of whales in the family Squaloziphiidae. It is named after the Yaquina River.
