= Douglas Emlong =

American paleontologist (1942–1980)

Douglas Ralph Emlong (17 April 1942 – June 1980) was an amateur fossil collector from the Oregon Coast in the northwestern United States. His collections contributed to the discovery and description of numerous extinct marine mammal species, many of which are ancestral to extant groups. Described as an 'indefatigable' fossil collector with 'Promethian prowess in discovery of unprecedented vertebrate fossils', he contributed substantially to the field from the age of 14. The ancestral pinniped Enaliarctos emlongi was named in his honor by Annalisa Berta in 1991.

== Discoveries ==
Fossils discovered by Douglas Emlong include:

Marine Mammals:

- Aetiocetus cotylalveus, an early, toothed relative of baleen whales and evolutionary link between ancient and modern cetaceans
- Simocetus, a genus of bottom-feeding pug-nosed whales which may have had comparable echolocation abilities to modern toothed whales
- Behemotops, a genus of primitive, elephant-like desmostylians
- A remarkably complete skeleton of Enaliarctos, a late-Oligocene pinniped ancestor, from Pyramid Hill, California
- The first complete skull of Kolponomos, a relative of bears specialized in diving for mollusks, which was previously thought to be a raccoon ancestor

Birds:

- Tonsala hildegardae, a late-Oligocene pelicaniform which proved the existence of the proposed family Plotopteridae
