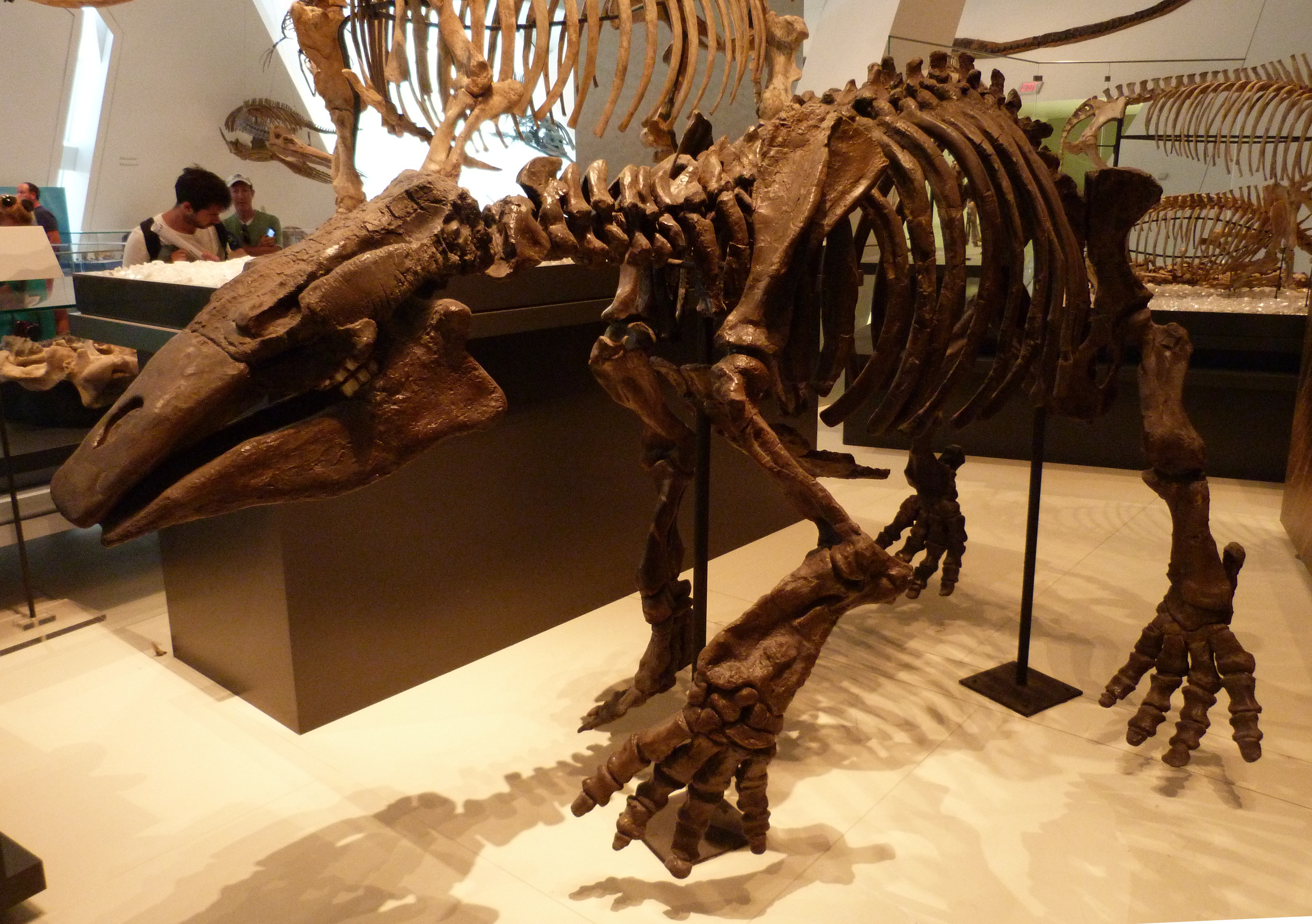
- Desmostylus, Royal Ontario Museum

Scientific classification
- Kingdom: Animalia
- Phylum: Chordata
- Class: Mammalia
- Order: †Desmostylia
- Family: †Desmostylidae; Osborn 1905

Genera
- †Behemotops; †Cornwallius; †Desmostylus; †Kronokotherium; †Ounalashkastylus

= Desmostylidae =

Desmostylidae Temporal range: Early Oligocene to Miocene, 33.9–7.2 Ma

Extinct family of mammals

Desmostylidae is an extinct family of herbivorous marine mammals belonging to the order of Desmostylia. They lived in the coastal waters of the northern Pacific Ocean from the Early Oligocene (Rupelian) through the Late Miocene (Tortonian) (33.9 mya—7.2 MYA), existing for approximately 26.7 million years.

== Taxonomy and systematics ==
Desmostylidae was named by Osborn 1905 and assigned to the order Desmostylia by McKenna and Bell in 1997.

Cockburn & Beatty 2009 found a subadult specimen of Behemotops proteus on Vancouver Island in 2007. They noted that the cranial features of their specimen were similar to those of Cornwallius and that the adult dentition was not delayed in their specimen, unlike in Desmostylus and other Afrotheria, and they concluded that Desmostylidae and Paleoparadoxiidae probably diverged earlier than previously believed and that delayed dentition can not be the most primitive state of Desmostylia.

== Ichnology ==
Trace fossils most likely produced by desmostylids are known in the form of Piscichnus waitemata from the Shirahama Formation of Japan. They were likely made by desmostylids using their oral pump to generate water flows while foraging.

== Classification ==
Classification after Chiba 2016:

- †Desmostylidae:
  - †Cornwallius
  - †Behemotops
  - †Desmostylus
  - †Kronokotherium
  - †Ounalashkastylus
