= Cornwallius =

Cornwallius Temporal range: Late Oligocene

Scientific classification
- Kingdom: Animalia
- Phylum: Chordata
- Class: Mammalia
- Order: †Desmostylia
- Family: †Desmostylidae
- Genus: †Cornwallius; Hay 1923
- Species: †C. sookensis

Binomial name
- †Cornwallius sookensis (Cornwall 1922)

Extinct genus of Desmostylidae mammals

Cornwallius is an extinct herbivorous marine mammal of the family Desmostylidae. Cornwallius lived along the North American Pacific Coast from the Early Oligocene (Chattian) into the Early Miocene (28.4 mya—20.6 Mya) and existing for approximately 7.8 million years.

The type locality is the Chattian Sooke Formation, Vancouver Island, British Columbia, Canada (48.4°N 123.9°W, paleocoordinates 48.0°N 115.0°W).

Cornwallius was named by Hay 1923. Its type is Desmostylus sookensis, named by Cornwall 1922 and recombined to Cornwallius sookensis by Hay 1923.

Fossils have been discovered from Baja California Peninsula, Oregon and Washington coasts, and Unalaska Island.
