= Slip Point Light =

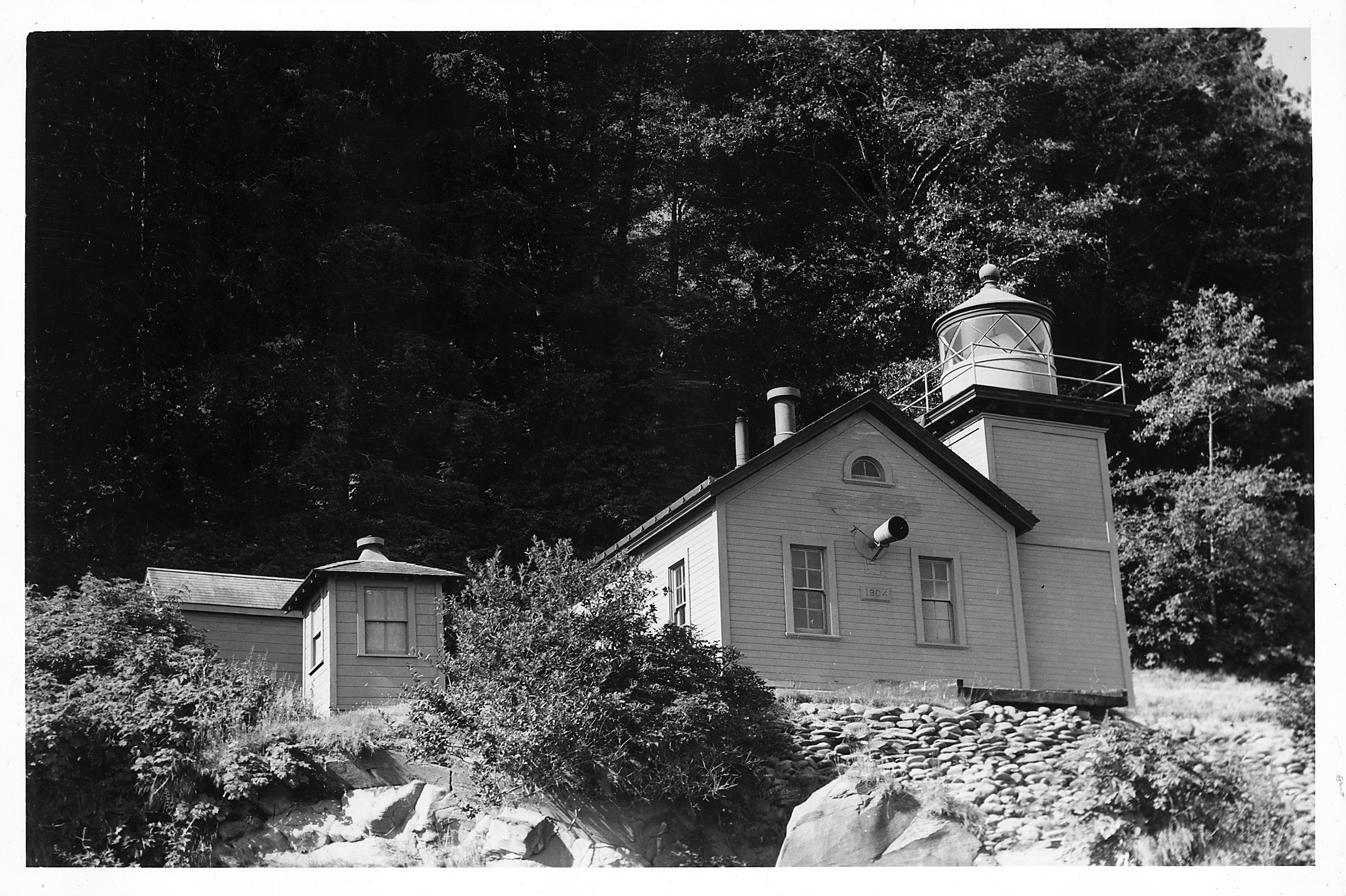
- Slip Point Light circa 1943 - 1953
- Location: Clallam Bay, Washington
- Coordinates: 48.2645°N 124.251°W

Tower
- Construction: Wood frame (first light); steel (second light)
- Automated: 1977
- Shape: Square (first); skeletal tower (second)
- Heritage: National Register of Historic Places listed place

Light
- First lit: April 1, 1905 (first); 1916 (second); 1951 (third)
- Deactivated: ca. 2000
- Focal height: 1916 tower: 35 feet (11 m); 1951 tower: 55 feet (17 m)
- Characteristic: 1916: white flash every 4 s; lightbuoy: green flash every 4 s

Slip Point Lighthouse was a lighthouse on the Strait of Juan de Fuca, sitting on the point of land that marks the eastern side of Clallam Bay in Clallam County, Washington. The original light was replaced by a freestanding tower in 1951, which was discontinued around 2000 and replaced with a buoy light.

== History ==
The Slip Point Light was constructed to fill the 60-mile (97 km) gap between the Cape Flattery and Ediz Hook lights. Funds appropriated in 1900 were insufficient to complete the station as planned, so the first light was simply a lantern hung on the front of the building housing the fog signal. This was first lit in September 1905; in 1916, a short square tower was built on the side of the building, its lantern housing a fourth-order clamshell Fresnel lens visible from the Canadian shore. This building sat at some distance from the keeper's dwelling, a 1½-story house rather larger than the lighthouse proper and situated on the other side of the point. Keepers had to cross a catwalk one-fifth of a mile in length to get from their quarters to the tend the light and fog building.

In 1951, a skeleton tower sheathed in white panels replaced the original fog house and tower. The structures were removed, although the catwalk remained, as the light was not automated until 1977. Around 2000, this light was also discontinued, leaving only a buoy to mark the point. The keeper's house is now used by the local sheriff's department, and the only other traces of the light are the concrete footings which once supported the catwalk. The land is part of Clallam Bay Spit Community Beach County Park. The light's location was listed on the National Register of Historic Places in 2023.
