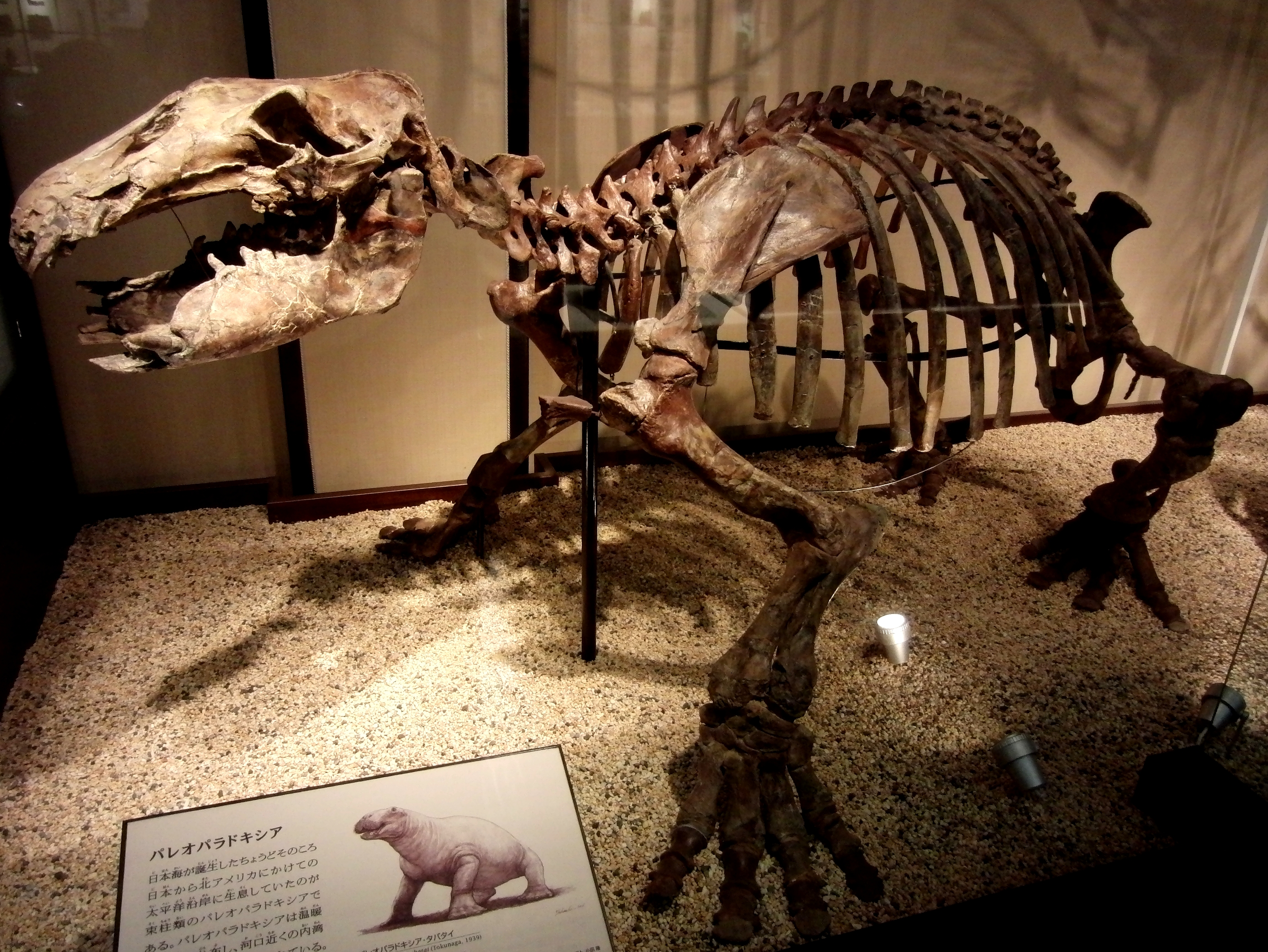
- Paleoparadoxia tabatai skeleton in the National Museum of Nature and Science, Tokyo
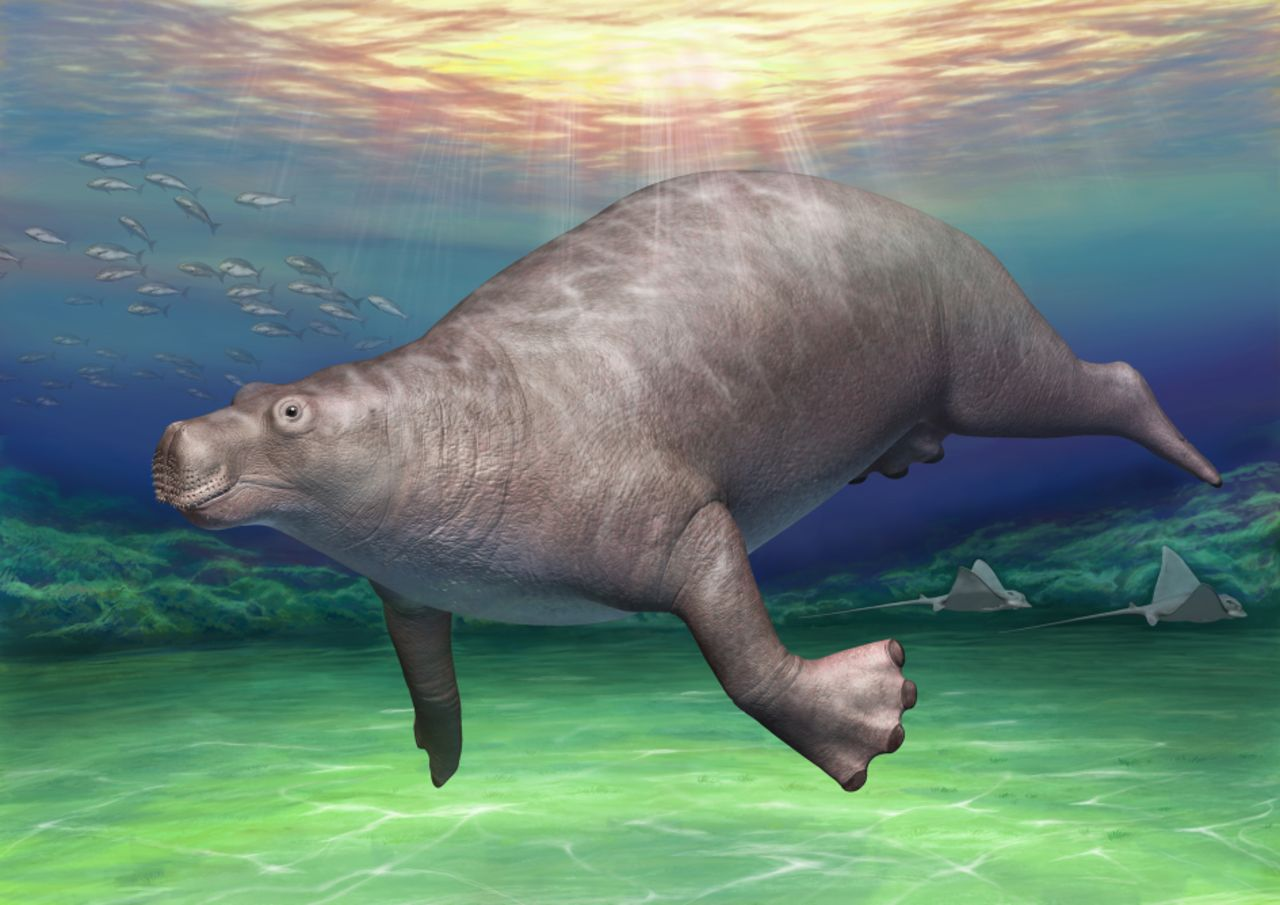
- Restoration

Scientific classification
- Kingdom: Animalia
- Phylum: Chordata
- Class: Mammalia
- Order: †Desmostylia
- Family: †Paleoparadoxiidae
- Genus: †Paleoparadoxia; Reinhart 1959

Type species
- †Paleoparadoxia tabatai

Species
- P. media Inuzuka 2005; P. tabatai Tokunaga 1939

= Paleoparadoxia =

Paleoparadoxia Temporal range: Miocene

Extinct genus of mammals

Paleoparadoxia ("ancient paradox") is a genus of large, herbivorous aquatic mammals that inhabited the northern Pacific coastal region during the Miocene epoch (20 to 10 million years ago). It ranged from the waters of Japan (Tsuyama and Yanagawa), to Alaska in the north, and down to Baja California, Mexico.

== Description ==
Paleoparadoxia is thought to have fed primarily on seaweeds and sea grasses. The jaws and the angle of the teeth resemble a backhoe bucket. Its bulky body was well adapted for swimming and underwater foraging. Originally interpreted as amphibious, Paleoparadoxia is now thought to have been a fully marine mammal like their possible relatives, the sirenians, spending most of their lives walking across the sea bottom like marine hippos. Studies on its habitat preference show that it favoured deep, offshore waters.

Recent discoveries have extended the known geographical range of Paleoparadoxia, with the oldest record from the northwest Pacific suggesting a much earlier presence in this region. This finding implies that Paleoparadoxia had a wider distribution and potentially different migratory patterns than previously understood, hinting at a complex early evolution within the Desmostylia order.

Size estimates of P. tabatai vary, with the Tsuyama specimen measuring 215 cm (7.05 ft) in length, 80 cm (2.6 ft) in height, and 582 kg (1,283 lb) in body mass, and the other specimens measuring 1,048 kg (2,310 lb) and 3.2 metric tons (3.5 short tons) in body mass.

Tokunaga 1939 named the genus Cornwallius but Reinhart 1959 synonymized it as a species of Paleoparadoxia.

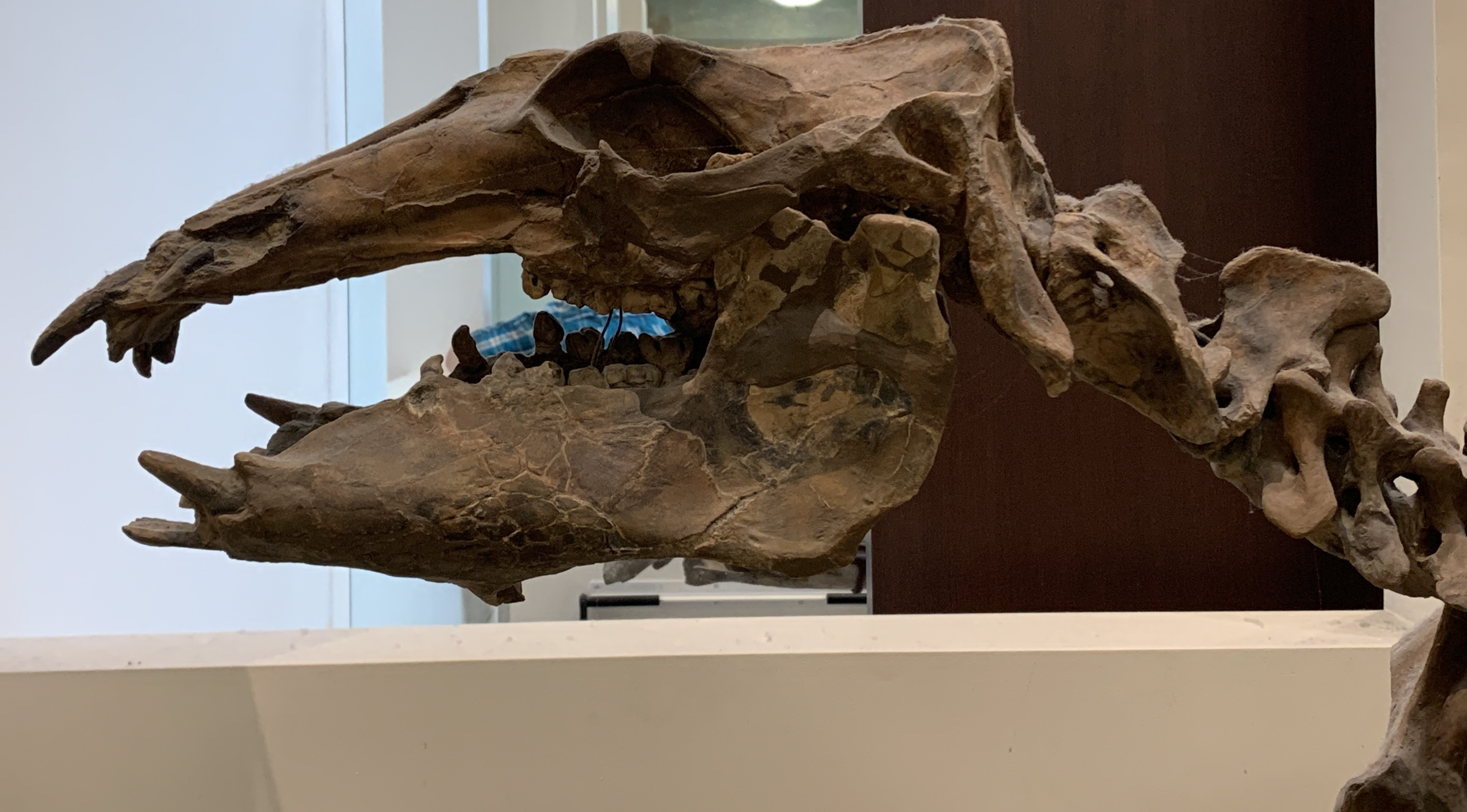
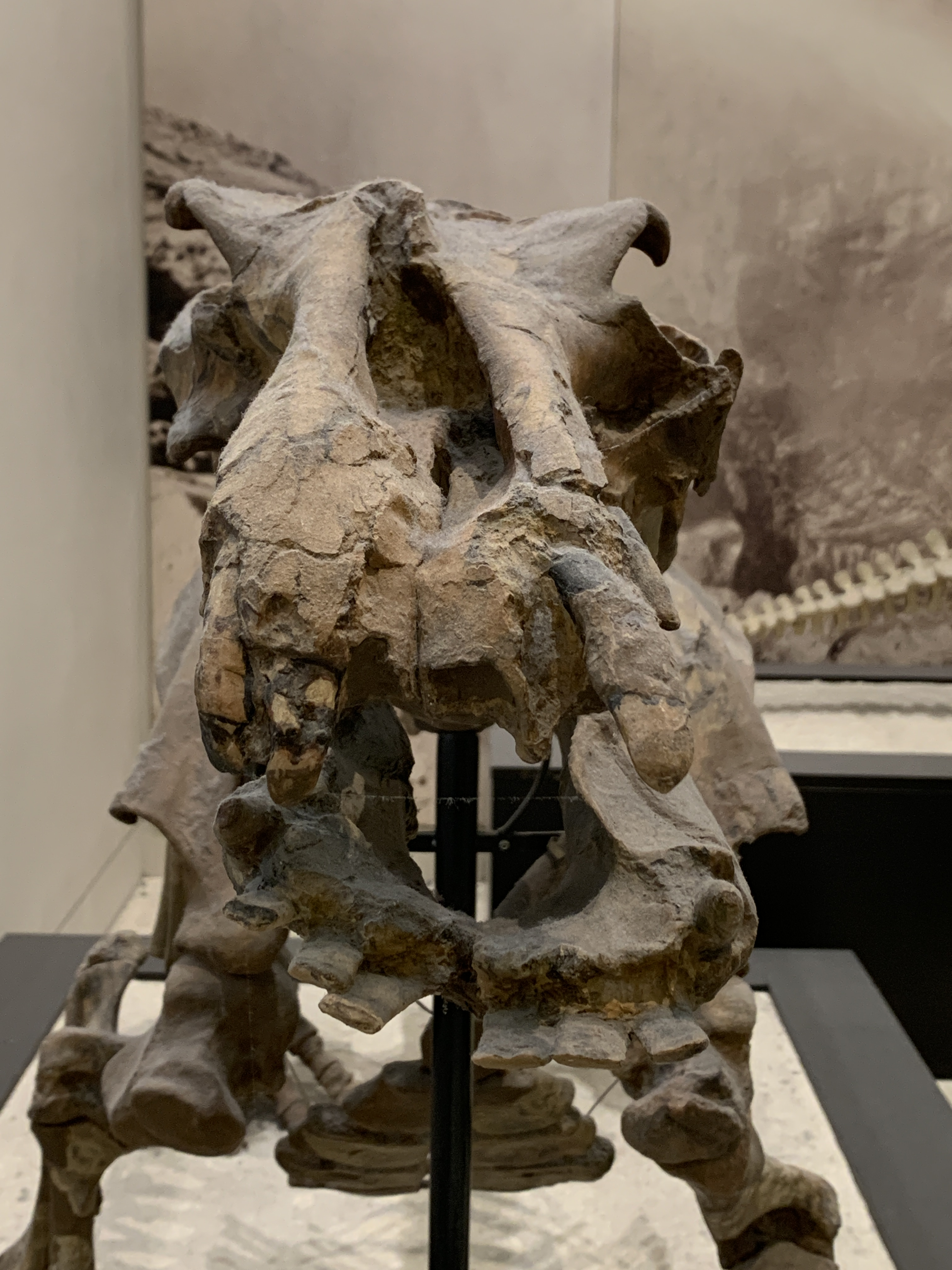
P. tabatai skull cast of a specimen from Japan, at the AMNH

== See also ==
- Behemotops
- Desmostylus
- Tethytheria

== Bibliography ==
- Clark, J. M. (1991). "A new early Miocene species of Paleoparadoxia (Mammalia: Desmostylia) from California". Journal of Vertebrate Paleontology. 11 (4): 490–508. Bibcode:1991JVPal..11..490C. doi:10.1080/02724634.1991.10011417. OCLC 4908959659.
- Domning, D. P.; Barnes, L. G. (2007). "A new name for the 'Stanford Skeleton' of Paleoparadoxia (Mammalia, Desmostylia)". Journal of Vertebrate Paleontology. 27 (3): 748–751. doi:10.1671/0272-4634(2007)27[748:annfts]2.0.co;2. OCLC 4630515072. S2CID 86342777.
- Hayashi, Shoji; Houssaye, Alexandra; Nakajima, Yasuhisa; Chiba, Kentaro; Ando, Tatsuro; Sawamura, Hiroshi; Inuzuka, Norihisa; Kaneko, Naotomo; Osaki, Tomohiro (2013). "Bone Inner Structure Suggests Increasing Aquatic Adaptations in Desmostylia (Mammalia, Afrotheria)". PLOS ONE. 8 (4) e59146. Bibcode:2013PLoSO...859146H. doi:10.1371/journal.pone.0059146. PMC 3615000. PMID 23565143.
- Inuzuka, Norihisa (2005). "The Stanford Skeleton of Paleoparadoxia (Mammalia: Desmostylia)". Bulletin of the Ashoro Museum of Paleontology. 3: 3–110.
- Kemp, Tom S. (2005). The Origin and Evolution of Mammals. Oxford University Press. ISBN 0-19-850761-5. OCLC 56652579.
- Reinhart, Roy Herbert (1959). "A review of the Sirenia and Desmostylia". University of California Publications in Geological Sciences. 36 (1): 1–146. OCLC 3474601.
- Tokunaga, Shigeyasu (1939). "A new fossil mammal belonging to the Desmostylidae". Jubilee publication commemorating Prof. H. Yabe, M.I.A. sixtieth birthday. Vol. 1. Sendai (Japan): Tohoku Imperial University, Inst. Geol. Pal. pp. 289–299.
