= Squaloziphiidae =

Scientific classification
- Kingdom: Animalia
- Phylum: Chordata
- Class: Mammalia
- Infraclass: Placentalia
- Order: Artiodactyla
- Infraorder: Cetacea
- Parvorder: Odontoceti
- Family: †Squaloziphiidae; Muizon, 1990

Squaloziphiidae is an extinct family of whales under the order Artiodactyla.

== Genera ==
This family contains the following genera:

- Crisocetus Gaetán et al. 2023
- Squaloziphius Muizon, 1990
- Yaquinacetus Lambert et al., 2019
