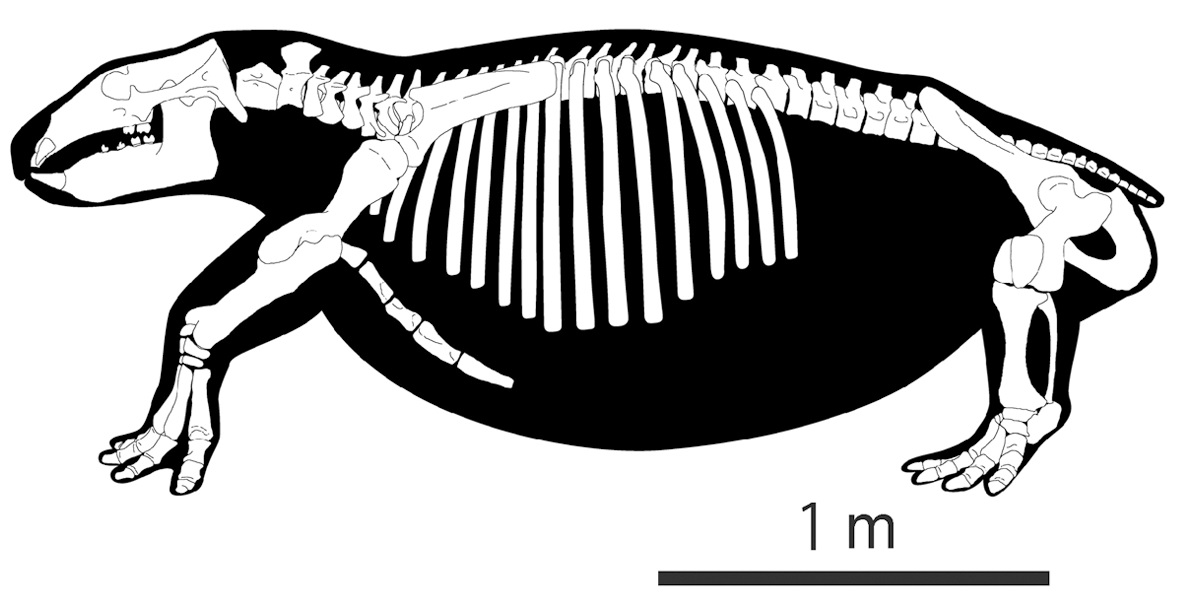

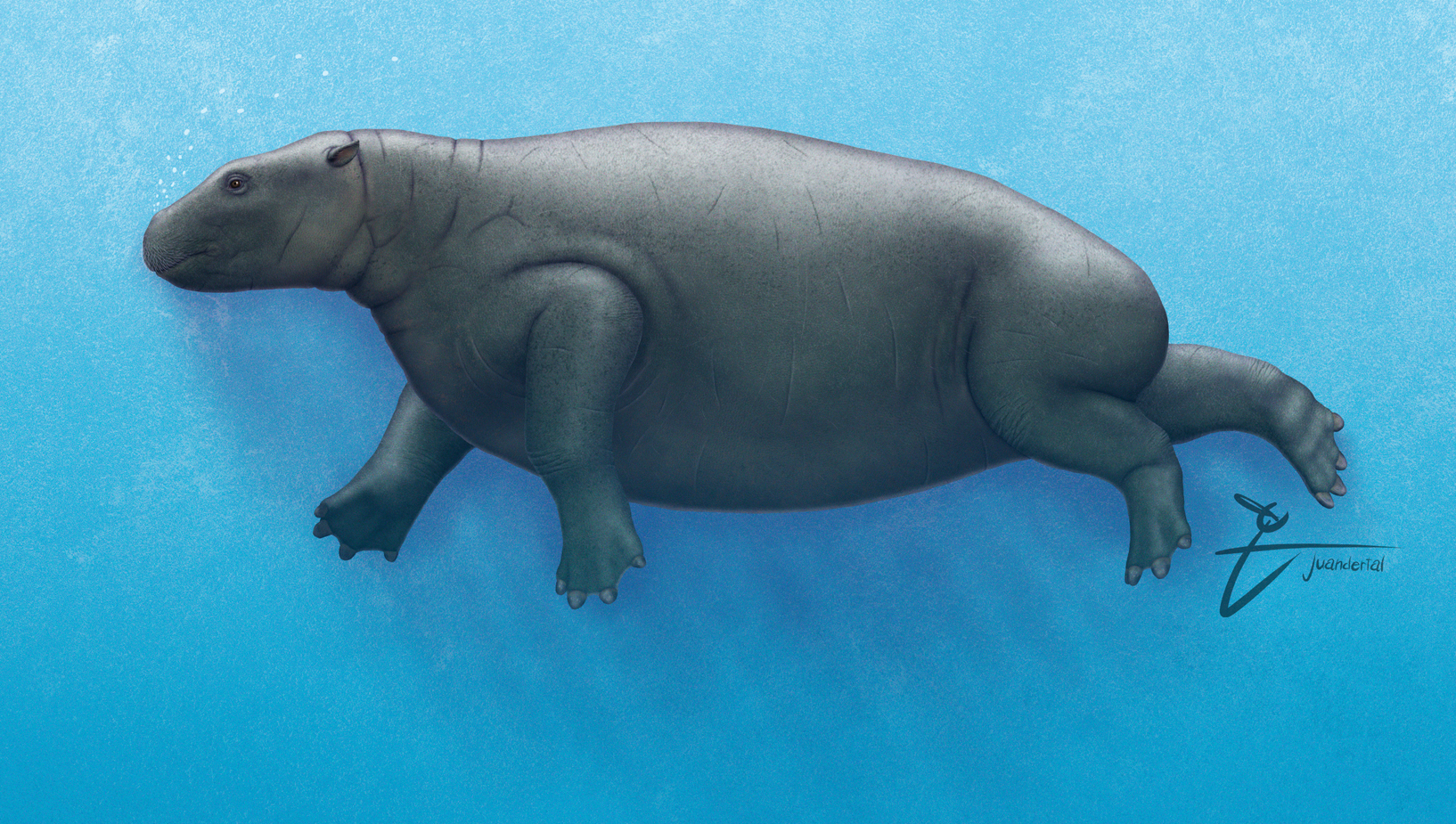

Scientific classification
- Kingdom: Animalia
- Phylum: Chordata
- Class: Mammalia
- Order: †Desmostylia
- Family: †Desmostylidae
- Genus: †Behemotops; Domning, Ray & McKenna 1986

Type species
- * †Behemotops proteus Domning, Ray & McKenna 1986

Other species
- †B. katsuiei Inuzuka 2000

= Behemotops =

Behemotops Temporal range: Oligocene

Extinct genus of marine mammal

Behemotops (from the Biblical monster Behemoth, by Linnaeus and others believed to be a hippo) is an extinct genus of herbivorous marine mammal. It lived from the Early Oligocene (Rupelian) through the Late Oligocene (33.9 mya—23 Mya), existing for approximately 10.9 million years. It is the most primitive known desmostylian, believed to be close to the ancestry of all other desmostylians.

== Description ==
In comparison with later known desmostylians, Behemotops had more elephantine tooth and jaw features. It had cusped molars that more resembled those of mastodons or other land ungulates than those of later Desmostylus, which exhibited odd "bound-pillar" shaped molars which may have evolved in response to the grit from a diet of sea-grass. Discovery of Behemotops helped place desmostylians as more closely related to proboscideans than sirenians, although relationships of this group are still poorly resolved.

B. proteus was larger than Desmostylus, measuring 323 cm (10.60 ft) in length, 120 cm (3.9 ft) in height and 1,979 kilograms (4,363 lb) in body mass. B. katsuiei had an estimated body length of 290 cm (110 in), making it the smaller of the two species.

=== Formerly placed in Behemotops ===
Behemotops emlongi, also described in 1986, was placed in the synonymy of B. proteus in 1994, but was later placed in its own genus, Seuku, in 2014. The first specimen, USNM 186889, a massive tusk in fragments of a mandible — was found in Lincoln County, Oregon (44°29′50″N 124°05′00″W) in 1969. In 1977, at the same location, fossil collector Douglas Emlong discovered a poorly preserved half right mandible — USNM 244033 — matching the first specimen. This mandible became the holotype of Seuku emlongi (then described as B. emlongi) when described by Domning, Ray & McKenna 1986. B. emlongi was later eventually made a synonym of B. proteus in 1994, before being removed from the genus altogether.

== History of discovery ==
=== B. proteus ===
In 1976, Emlong discovered a juvenile mandible — USNM 244035 — on Olympic Peninsula, Clallam County, Washington (48.2°N 123.9°W, paleocoordinates 47.8°N 115.0°W) which Domning, Ray & McKenna 1986 made the holotype of B. proteus. Teeth of a young adult — LACM 124106 – was found in the same rock unit in 1986.

More complete material of B. proteus was found on Vancouver Island, British Columbia in 2007: the left side of an entire skull with several teeth, a partial scapula, an almost complete humerus, and several ribs and vertebrae. The cranial features of this specimen were similar to those of Cornwallius, from which Cockburn & Beatty 2009 concluded that Desmostylidae and Paleoparadoxiidae probably diverged earlier than previously believed. Cockburn and Beatty also noted that, in their specimen, all teeth have erupted but the epiphyses of the bones are unfused and that it probably was an subadult; from which they concluded that the adult dentition was not delayed in Behemotops, unlike Desmostylus and other Afrotheria, and that delayed dentition can not be the most primitive state of Desmostylia.

=== B. katsuiei ===
Skeletons of several individuals were found on western Hokkaido Island in Japan (43.3°N 143.8°E: paleocoordinates 44.6°N 141.4°E) in 1976, but this material remained unknown outside Japan until they were described in 1987. They were first assumed to be early Miocene in age, but a new analysis of the site in the mid-1980s revised their age to the Oligocene; making them the oldest found on the Japanese island, ancestral to all other desmostylians. They were later included into the genus Behemotops proposed by Domning et al. 1986.
