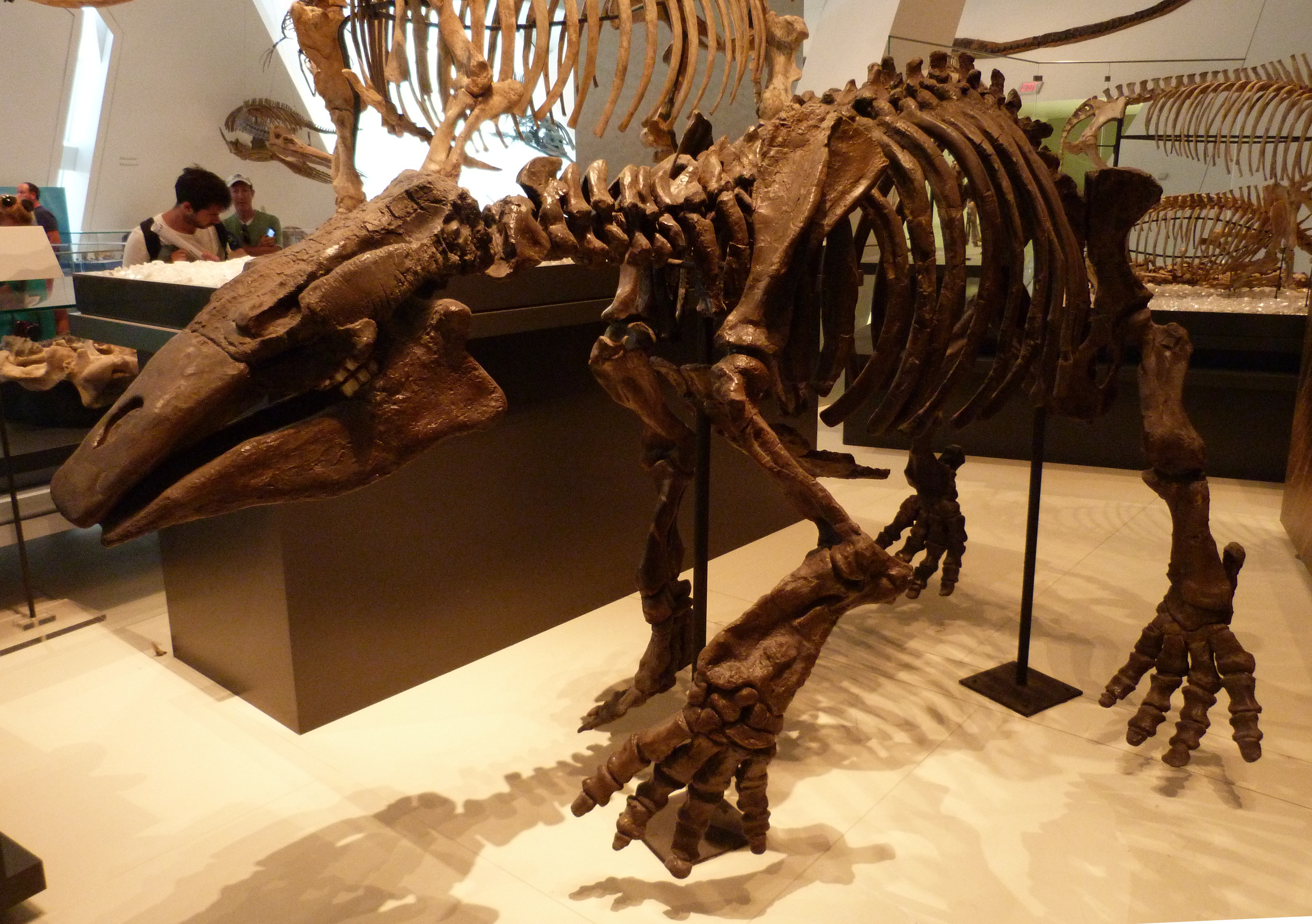
- Desmostylus, Royal Ontario Museum
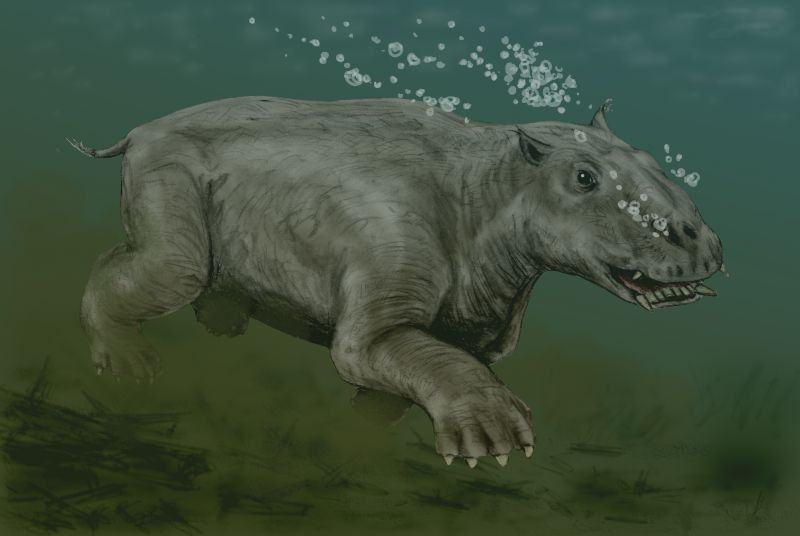
- Restoration of Paleoparadoxia

Scientific classification
- Kingdom: Animalia
- Phylum: Chordata
- Class: Mammalia
- Infraclass: Placentalia
- Order: †Desmostylia; Reinhart 1959

Families and genera
- †Desmostylidae; †Paleoparadoxiidae; †Archaeoparadoxia; †Ashoroa; †Neoparadoxia; †Paleoparadoxia

= Desmostylia =

Desmostylia Temporal range: Early Oligocene-Late Miocene, 33.9–7.2 Ma Suspected Middle Eocene origin

Extinct order of mammals

Desmostylia (from Ancient Greek δεσμά (desmá), meaning "bundle", and στῦλος (stûlos), meaning "pillar") is an extinct order of aquatic mammals native to the North Pacific from the Early Oligocene (Rupelian) to the Late Miocene (Tortonian) from 33.9 to 7.2 or 5.3 Ma. However, phylogenetic models suggests the order first appeared during Middle Eocene between 47 and 39 Ma. Desmostylians are the only known extinct order of marine mammals. Their taxonomic placement within Placentalia is subject to considerable debate.

The Desmostylia, was traditionally assigned to the afrotherian clade Tethytheria, together with Sirenia (manatees and dugongs) and Proboscidea (elephants and their extinct relatives) and the extinct Embrithopoda. The relationship between the Desmostylia and the other orders within the Tethytheria has been disputed; if the common ancestor of all tethytheres was semiaquatic, the Proboscidea became secondarily terrestrial; alternatively, the Desmostylia and Sirenia could have evolved independently into aquatic mammals. The assignment of Desmostylia to Afrotheria has always been problematic from a biogeographic standpoint, given that Africa was the locus of the early evolution of the Afrotheria while the Desmostylia have been found only along the Pacific Rim. That assignment has been potentially undermined by a 2014 cladistic analysis that places anthracobunids and desmostylians, two major groups of putative non-African afrotheres, close to each other within the laurasiatherian order Perissodactyla. However, a subsequent study shows that, while anthracobunids are definite perissodactyls, desmostylians share the same number of characteristics necessary for either Paenungulata or Perissodactyla, making their former assessment as afrotheres a possibility.

Desmostylians reached their highest diversity during the Late Oligocene with roughly 9 contemporary species, with another peak in diversification during the Middle Miocene Climatic Optimum. Following the Middle Miocene Climatic Optimum, the order saw a terminal decline before going extinct. The extinction of the order is widely considered to have been the result of changing ecosystems and competition with sirenians.

== Classification ==
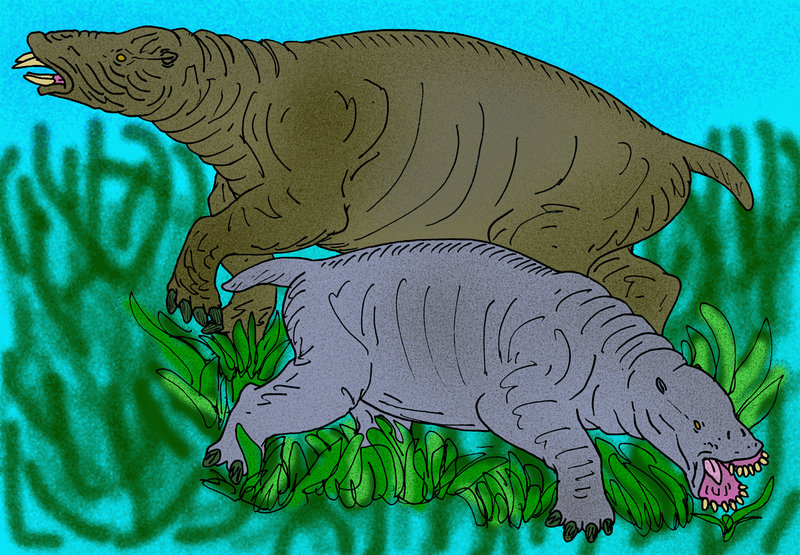
Restoration of Desmostylus and Paleoparadoxia

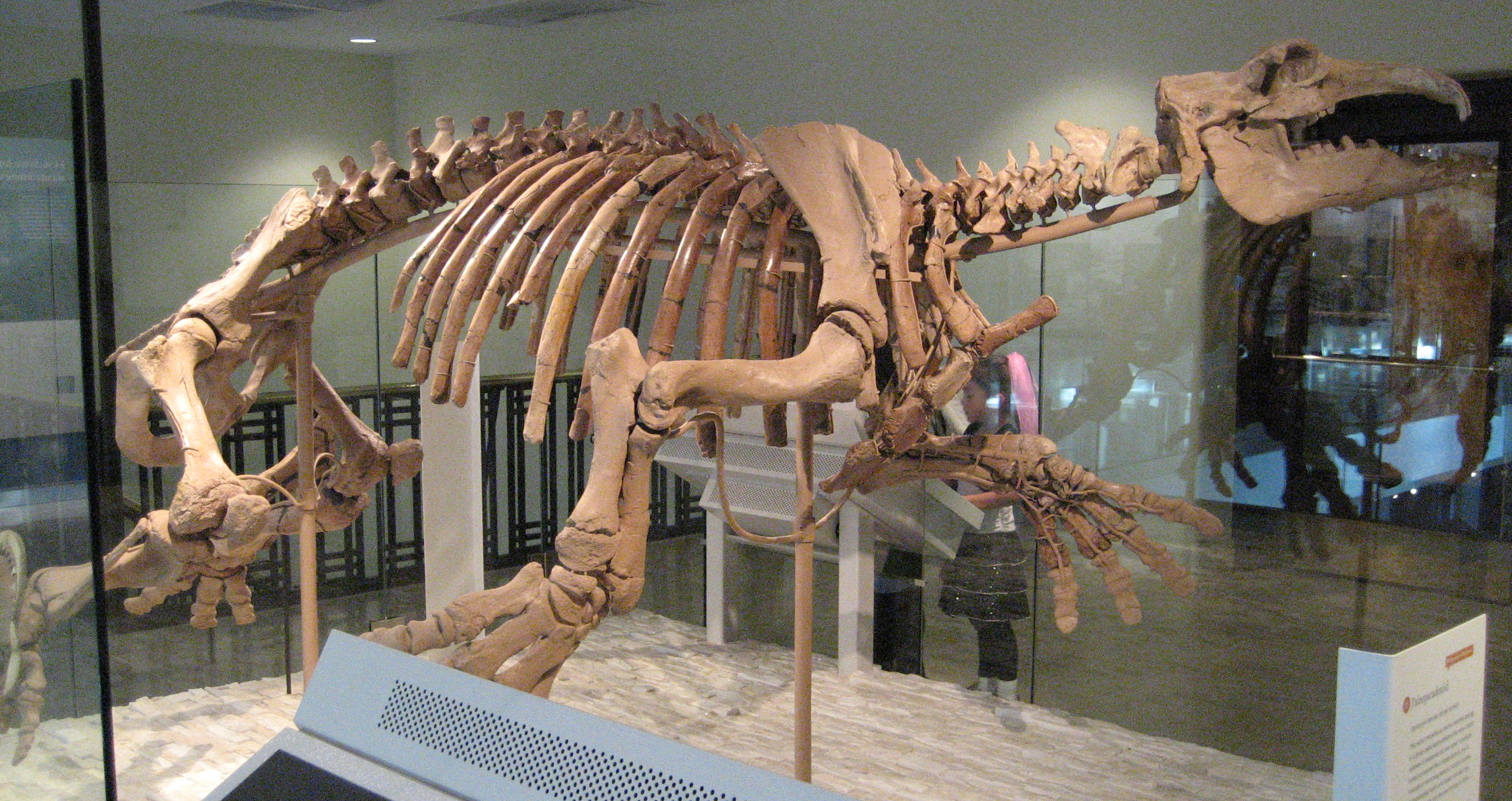
Neoparadoxia cecilialina on display at the Natural History Museum of Los Angeles County

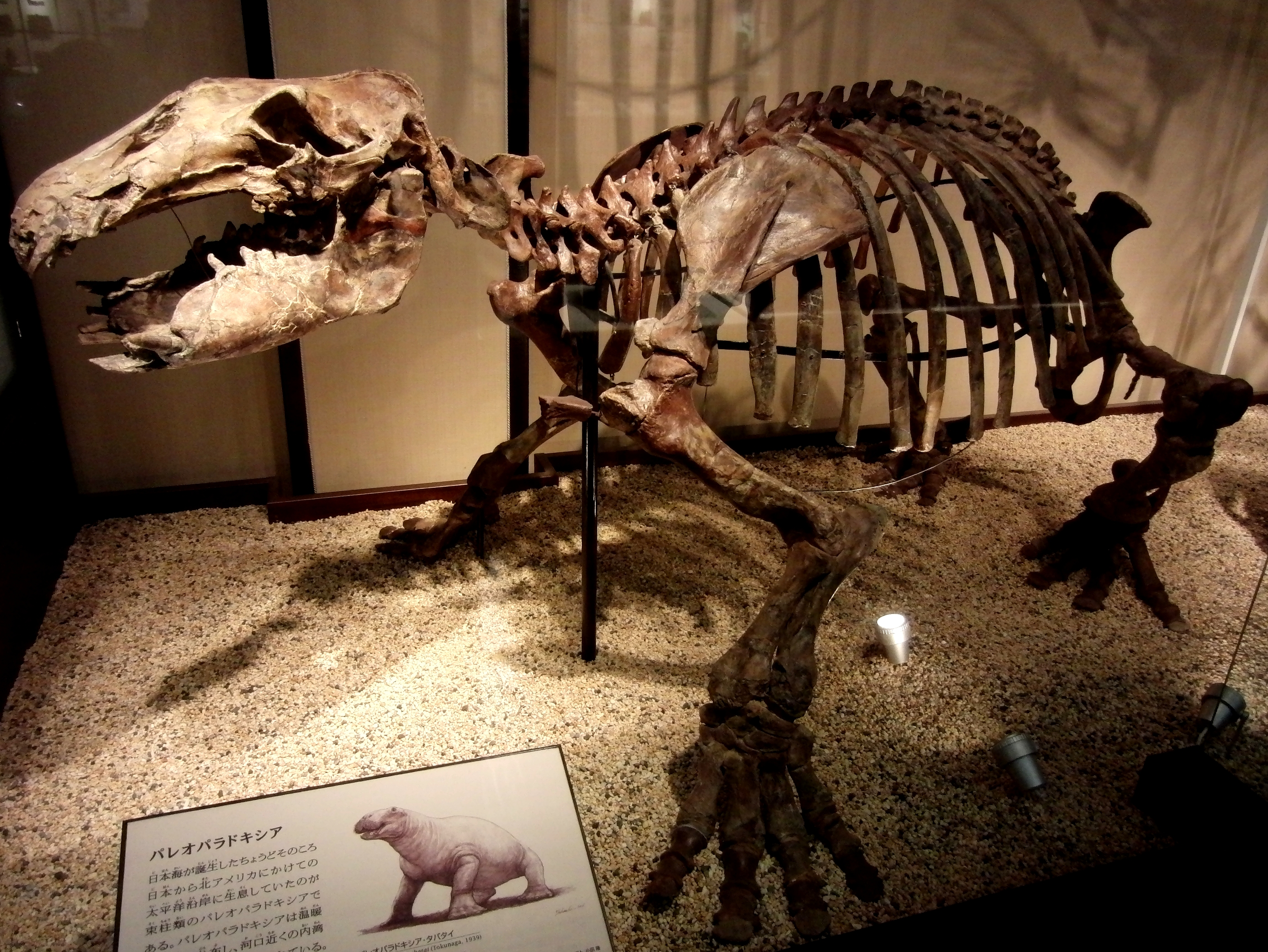
Paleoparadoxia skeleton

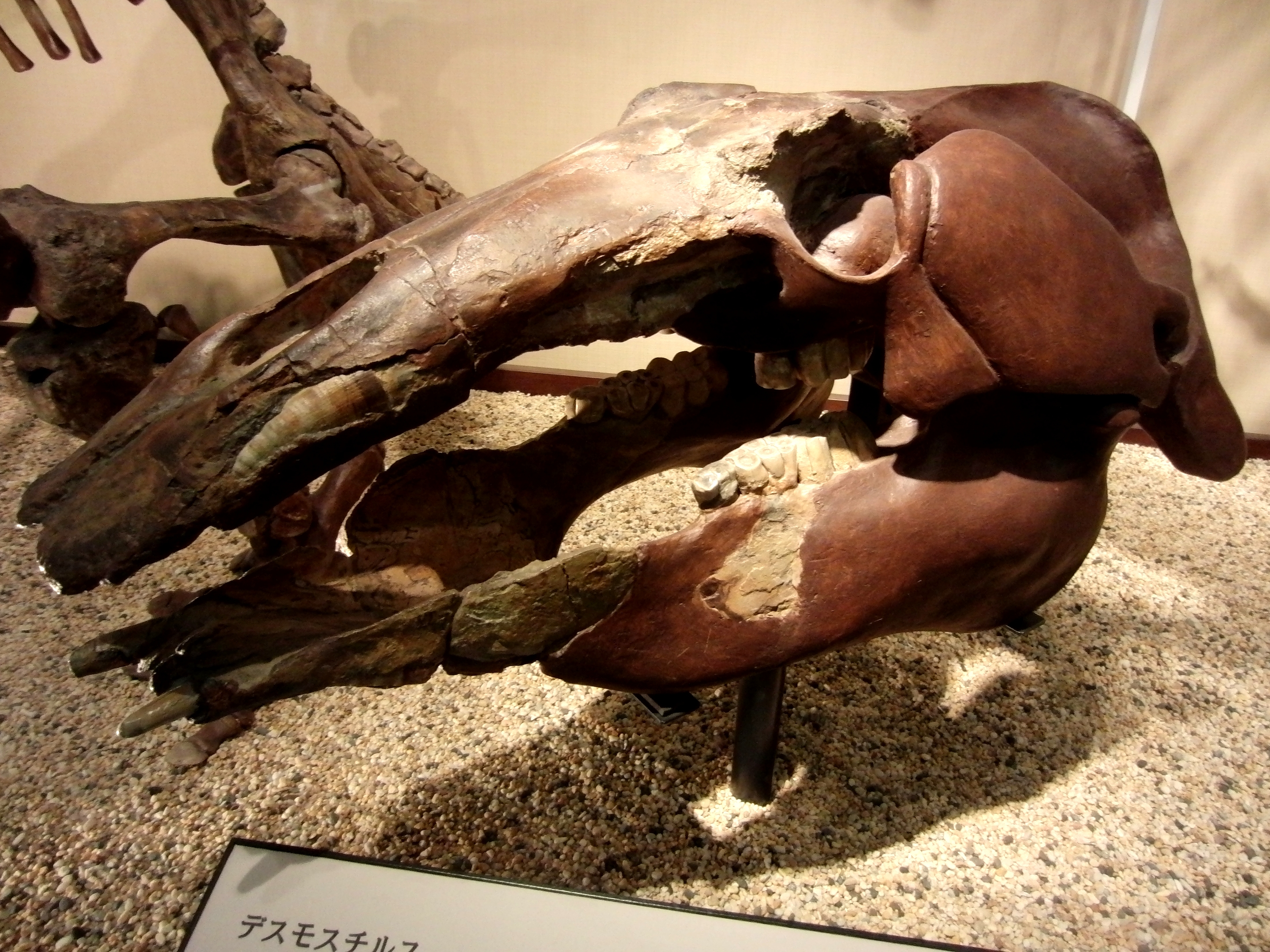
Skull of Desmostylus

The type species Desmostylus hesperus was originally classified from a few teeth and vertebrae as a sirenian by Marsh 1888, but doubts arose a decade later when more complete fossils were discovered in Japan. Osborn 1905 also proposed that they belonged to the Sirenia. One of the most comprehensive collections of desmostylian teeth was amassed by paleontologist John C. Merriam, who concluded on the basis of the molar structure and repeated occurrence in marine beds that the animals had been aquatic, and were probably sirenian.

In 1926, the Austrian palaeontologist Othenio Abel suggested origins with monotremes, like the duck-billed platypus, and in 1933, he even created the order "Desmostyloidea", which he placed within the Multituberculata. Abel died shortly after World War II, and his classification won few supporters and has been ignored since.

Because desmostylians were originally known only from skull fragments, teeth, and bits of other bones, general agreement was that they had had flippers and a fin-like tail. The discovery of a complete skeleton from Sakhalin Island in 1941, however, showed that they possessed four legs, with bones as stout as a hippopotamus', and justified the creation of a new order for the desmostylians, described by Reinhart 1959.

A major find was announced in October 2015 after scientists examined an extensive group of giant, tusked, quadruped, marine mammal fossils. This northernmost to date species discovery had been unearthed during excavation for the construction of a school in Unalaska, in the Aleutian Islands. A rendition of a group was drawn by Alaskan artist Ray Troll.

Despite their similarities to manatees and elephants, desmostylians were entirely unlike any living creatures. Douglas Emlong's 1971 discovery of the new genus Behemotops from Oregon showed that early desmostylians had more proboscidean-like teeth and jaws than later ones. Despite this discovery, their relationships to manatees and proboscids remain unresolved. The analysis of Cooper et al. (2014) indicates the similarities with manatees and elephants may be a result of convergence and that they may instead be basal perissodactyls.

Barnes 2013 proposed a new classification of Paleoparadoxiidae:

- Order Desmostylia Reinhart, 1953
  - Family Paleoparadoxiidae Reinhart, 1959
    - Subfamily Behemotopsinae (Inuzuka, 1987)
      - Behemotops Domning, Ray, and McKenna, 1986
        - Behemotops proteus Domning, Ray, and McKenna, 1986 (including Behemotops emlongi Domning, Ray, and McKenna, 1986)
        - Behemotops katsuiei Inuzuka, 2000b
    - Subfamily Paleoparadoxiinae (Reinhart, 1959)
      - Archaeoparadoxia
        - Archaeoparadoxia weltoni (Clark, 1991)
      - Paleoparadoxia Reinhart, 1959
        - Paleoparadoxia tabatai (Tokunaga, 1939), (= Paleoparadoxia media Inuzuka, 2005)
      - Neoparadoxia Barnes, 2013
        - Neoparadoxia repenningi (Domning and Barnes, 2007)
        - Neoparadoxia cecilialina Barnes, 2013

== Description ==
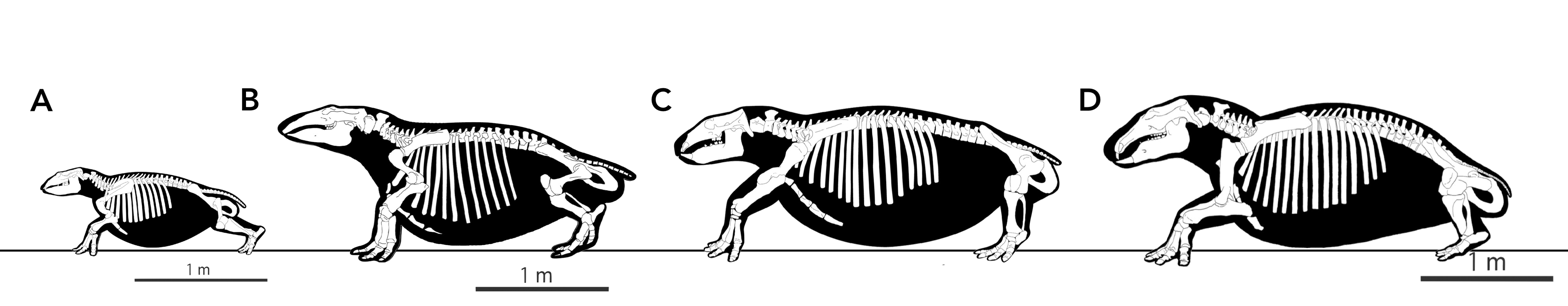
Skeletal diagrams: (A) Ashoroa, (B) Desmostylus, (C) Behemetops, (D) Paleoparadoxia

Desmostylians were large, fully aquatic quadrupeds with massive limbs and short tails. The smallest is Ashoroa laticosta, a relatively large animal at a body length of 168 centimetres or 5 feet 6 inches, while the largest species reached sizes comparable to Steller's sea cow.

A desmostylian skull has an elongated and broadened rostrum, with the nasal opening located slightly dorsally. The zygomatic arches are prominent (behind the eyes), the paroccipital processes elongated (downward-pointing processes behind the jaw-joints), and the epitympanic sinuses open into the temporal fossae (cavities above the ear holes).

The mandible and maxilla typically have forward-pointing incisors and canine tusks, followed by a long postcanine diastema, partly because of the reduced number of premolars. The cusps of the premolars and molars are composed of densely packed cylinders of thick enamel, giving the order its name ("bundle of columns"). The primitive dental formula is 3.1.4.3, with a trilobate fourth deciduous premolar. The cheek teeth are brachydont and bunodont in primitive genera, but hypsodont in later genera such as Desmostylus, which has many supernumerary cusps.

In the postcrania, the clavicle is absent and the sternum consists of a series of heavy, paired, plate-like sternebrae. In adults, the joints between the radius and ulna prevent any movements. The metacarpals are longer than metatarsals, and each foot has four digits (digit I is vestigial).

== Habitat preference ==
Their dental and skeletal forms suggest that desmostylians were aquatic herbivores dependent on littoral habitats. Their name refers to their highly distinctive molars, in which each cusp was modified into hollow columns, so a typical molar would have resembled a cluster of pipes, or in the case of worn molars, volcanoes. (This may reflect the close relationship between the Paenungulata, to which this group has been assigned, and the Tubulidentata.)

Desmostylus did not chew or eat like any other known animal. It clenched its teeth, rooted up plants with the help of tusks and powerful neck, and then sucked them in using strong throat muscles and the shape of the roof of the mouth.

Desmostylians are believed to be aquatic because of a combination of characteristics. Their legs seemed to be adapted for terrestrial locomotion, while a number of other parameters confirms their aquatic nature:

- Fossils have been found in marine strata.
- The nares are retracted and the orbits are raised like in other aquatic mammals.
- Levels of stable isotopes in their tooth enamel suggest an aquatic diet and environment (carbon and oxygen) and fresh or brackish water (strontium).
- Their spongy bone structure is similar to that of cetaceans.

Based on a comparison of trunk and limb proportions, Gingerich 2005 concluded that desmostylians were more terrestrial than aquatic and clearly fore limb-dominated swimmers, hence they were more similar to "sea bears" than "sea sloths" (as proposed by other researchers.) However, a more recent and detailed analysis of desmostylian bone structure has revealed them to be fully aquatic, like sirenians and cetaceans, with their limbs being incapable of supporting their own weight on land. More recent studies vindicate this assessment, as desmostylians had a thoracic morphology more similar to sirenians and modern cetaceans than to that of semiaquatic mammals. Its less dense bone structure suggests that Desmostylus had a lifestyle of active swimming and possibly feeding at the surface, while other desmostylians were primarily slow swimmers and/or bottom walkers and sea grass feeders. Isotopic analysis recovered Desmostylus as an aquatic herbivore that foraged in estuarine and freshwater ecosystems.

A 2017 study on Desmostylus and Paleoparadoxia shows that the former preferred areas shallower than 30 m, while the latter occurred in deep, offshore waters based on fossil occurrences.

== Extinction ==
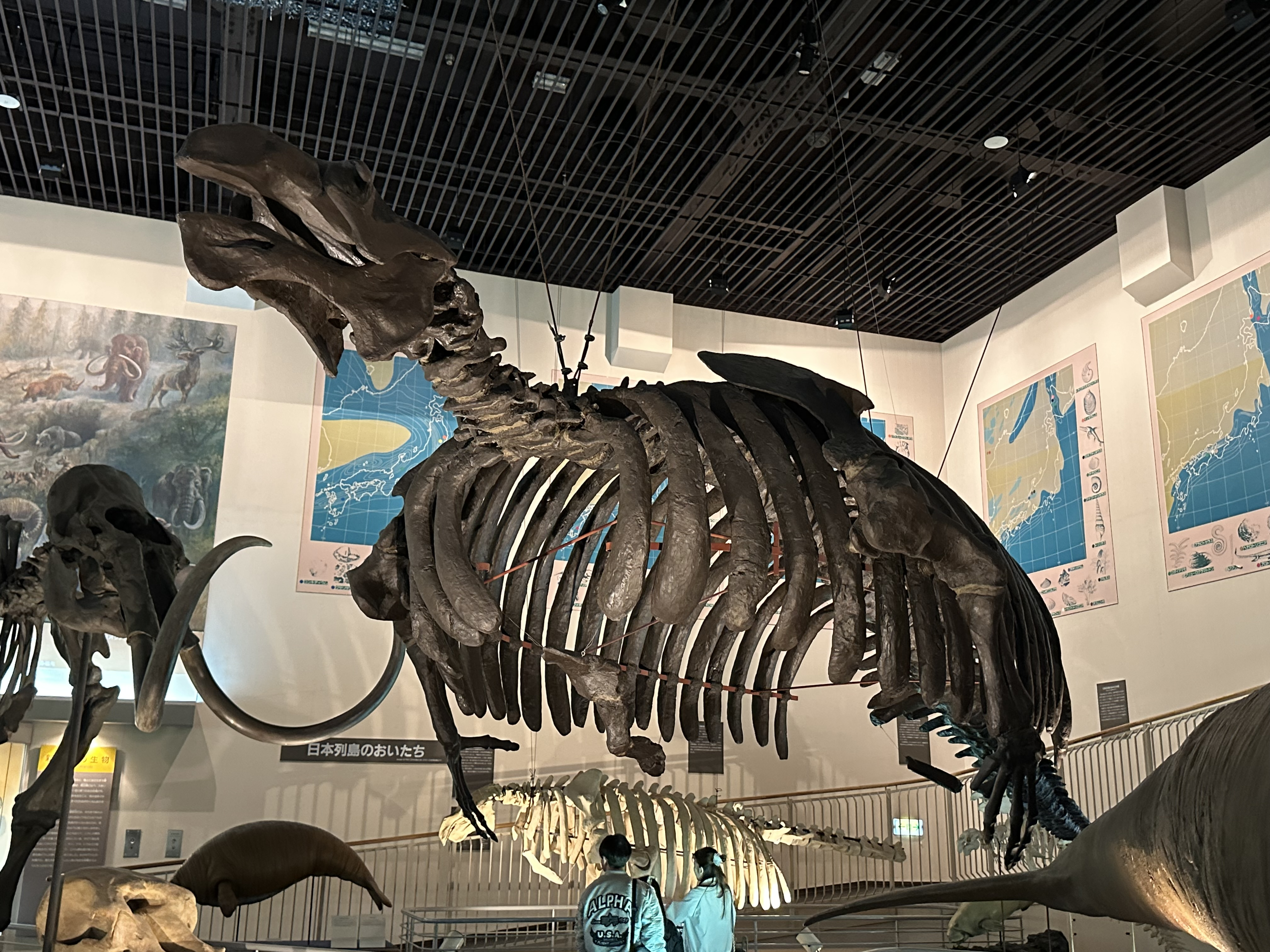
Skeletal mount of Hydrodamalis spissa. It is hypothesized that hydrodamalines sirenians, played a role in the extinction of desmostylians

Following the Middle Miocene Climatic Optimum, desmostylians saw a terminal decline before going extinct in the Late Miocene between 7.2 and 5.3 Ma. Desmostylians began to decline during the Middle to Late Miocene cooling event, with the reason being uncertain as they successfully adapted to cold environments during other cooling periods. Asai et al. (2025) suggested Middle to Late Miocene cooling events were more severe than previous cooling events which made the survival of desmostylians more difficult despite being adapted for cold environments. Many experts suggested that competition with sirenians also played a role in the decline and extinction of the order.

Domning (1976) noted that desmostylians were more cold-tolerant than Diplotherium allisoni and early hydroadamalines. However, as time went on, Diplotherium allisoni would go extinct due to the inability to adapt to the cooling waters due to its smaller body size and less favorable surface:volume ratio and reduction of kelps and Phyllospadix on exposed shorelines. The length of exposed shorelines likely had no significant increase and there was a less dramatic increase in exposed-habitat plants in general which continued to support desmostylians. He hypothesized the kelp specialization of hydrodamalines contributed to the extinction of desmostylians. Within his 2007 paper, Domning suggested desmostylians were unable to exploit tropical zones of other seas suggesting they couldn't compete with sirenians. On the contrary, hydrodamalines were able to exploit cooler-climate plant resources desmostylians fed upon.

Barnes (2013) suggested that desmostylians may have been outcompeted ecologically by dugongid sirenians. Later species like Neoparadoxia were noted to have been more specialized than earlier genera, suggesting increased divergence to compete with sirenians. Barnes also noted that the sirenian diversity appears to increase with desmostylian decline. Both desmostylians and North Pacific dugongids were apparently kelp specialists, as opposed to marine herbivorous mammals from other regions, with diets primarily composed of seagrass. Berta and Lanzetti (2020) found that based on distribution maps the decline of desmostylians coincided with the appearance of the genus Hydrodamalis. They also noted that the low and stableof the order made them more vulnerable to competition. Asai et al. (2025) noted while both clades coexisted with each other, competitive replacement is poorly understood and more analysis is required. Matusi et al. (2026) found that climatic changes can't be the sole factor of the extinction of Desmostylus as the genus showed resilience to the environmental changes during the Middle Miocene Climate Transition, suggesting competition likely played a role in their extinction. They also noted that Desmostylus ate seagrasses similar to modern sirenians suggesting they fed on the same resources. The last Desmostylus coincided with the appearance of hydrodamalines in the Northern Pacific suggesting competitive replacement.

== Sources ==
- Barnes, Lawrence G. (2013). "A New Genus of Late Miocene Paleoparadoxiid (Mammalia, Desmostylia) from California" (PDF). Contributions in Science. 521: 51–114. Archived from the original (PDF) on 7 November 2015.
- Clementz, Mark T.; Hoppe, Kathryn A.; Koch, Paul L. (2003). "A paleoecological paradox: the habitat and dietary preferences of the extinct tethythere Desmostylus, inferred from stable isotope analysis". Paleobiology. 29 (4): 506–519. Bibcode:2003Pbio...29..506C. doi:10.1666/0094-8373(2003)029<0506:APPTHA>2.0.CO;2. OCLC 211272891. S2CID 12567121.
- Cooper, L. N.; Seiffert, E. R.; Clementz, M.; Madar, S. I.; Bajpai, S.; Hussain, S. T.; Thewissen, J. G. M. (2014-10-08). "Anthracobunids from the Middle Eocene of India and Pakistan Are Stem Perissodactyls". PLOS ONE. 9 (10) e109232. Bibcode:2014PLoSO...9j9232C. doi:10.1371/journal.pone.0109232. PMC 4189980. PMID 25295875.
- Domning, Daryl P.; Ray, Clayton Edward; McKenna, Malcolm C. (1986). "Two new Oligocene desmostylians and a discussion of Tethytherian systematics" (PDF). Smithsonian Contributions to Paleobiology. 59 (59): 1–56. doi:10.5479/si.00810266.59.1. OCLC 12974759.
- Gingerich, Philip D. (2005). "Aquatic Adaptation and Swimming Mode Inferred from Skeletal Proportions in the Miocene Desmostylian Desmostylus" (PDF). Journal of Mammalian Evolution. 12 (1/2): 183–194. doi:10.1007/s10914-005-5719-1. hdl:2027.42/44971. S2CID 7812089.
- Hay, O. P. (1923). "Characteristics of sundry fossil vertebrates". Pan-American Geologist. 39: 101–20. OCLC 38855496.
- Hayashi, S.; Houssaye, A.; Nakajima, Y.; Kentaro, C.; Ando, T.; Sawamura, H.; Inuzuka, N.; Kaneko, N.; Osaki, T. (2013). "Bone Inner Structure Suggests Increasing Aquatic Adaptations in Desmostylia (Mammalia, Afrotheria)". PLOS ONE. 8 (4) e59146. Bibcode:2013PLoSO...859146H. doi:10.1371/journal.pone.0059146. OCLC 837402105. PMC 3615000. PMID 23565143.
- Inuzuka, N. (2000). "Primitive late Oligocene desmostylians from Japan and Phylogeny of the Desmostylia". Bulletin of the Ashoro Museum of Paleontology. 1: 91–123.
  - "N. Inuzuka 2000". Fossilworks.
- Marsh, O. C. (1888). "Notice of a new fossil sirenian, from California" (PDF). American Journal of Science. 25 (8): 94–96. Bibcode:1888AmJS...35...94M. doi:10.2475/ajs.s3-35.205.94. OCLC 79838746. S2CID 129254943.
- Osborn, H. F. (1905). "Ten years progress in the mammalian Palaeontology of North America". Extrait des Comptes Rendus du 6e Congres International de Zoologie. Session de Berne 1904: 86–113. OCLC 18502464.
- Pronina, I. G. (1957). "A new desmostylid, Kronokotherium brevimaxillare gen. nov., sp. nov., from the Miocene deposits of Kamchatka". C. R. Acad. Sci. URSS. 117: 310–12.
- Reinhart, Roy Herbert (1959). "A review of the Sirenia and Desmostylia". University of California Publications in Geological Sciences. 36 (1): 1–146. OCLC 3474601.
- Gheerbrant, Emmanuel; Domning, Daryl P.; Tassy, Pascal (2005). "Paenungulata". In Rose, Kenneth D.; Archibald, J. David (eds.). The Rise of Placental Mammals: Origins and Relationships of the Major Extant Clades. JHU Press. ISBN 978-0-8018-8022-3. OCLC 55801049.
- Uhen, Mark D. (2007). "Evolution of Marine Mammals: Back to the Sea After 300 Million Years". Anatomical Record. 290 (6): 514–22. doi:10.1002/ar.20545. OCLC 137264359. PMID 17516441.
