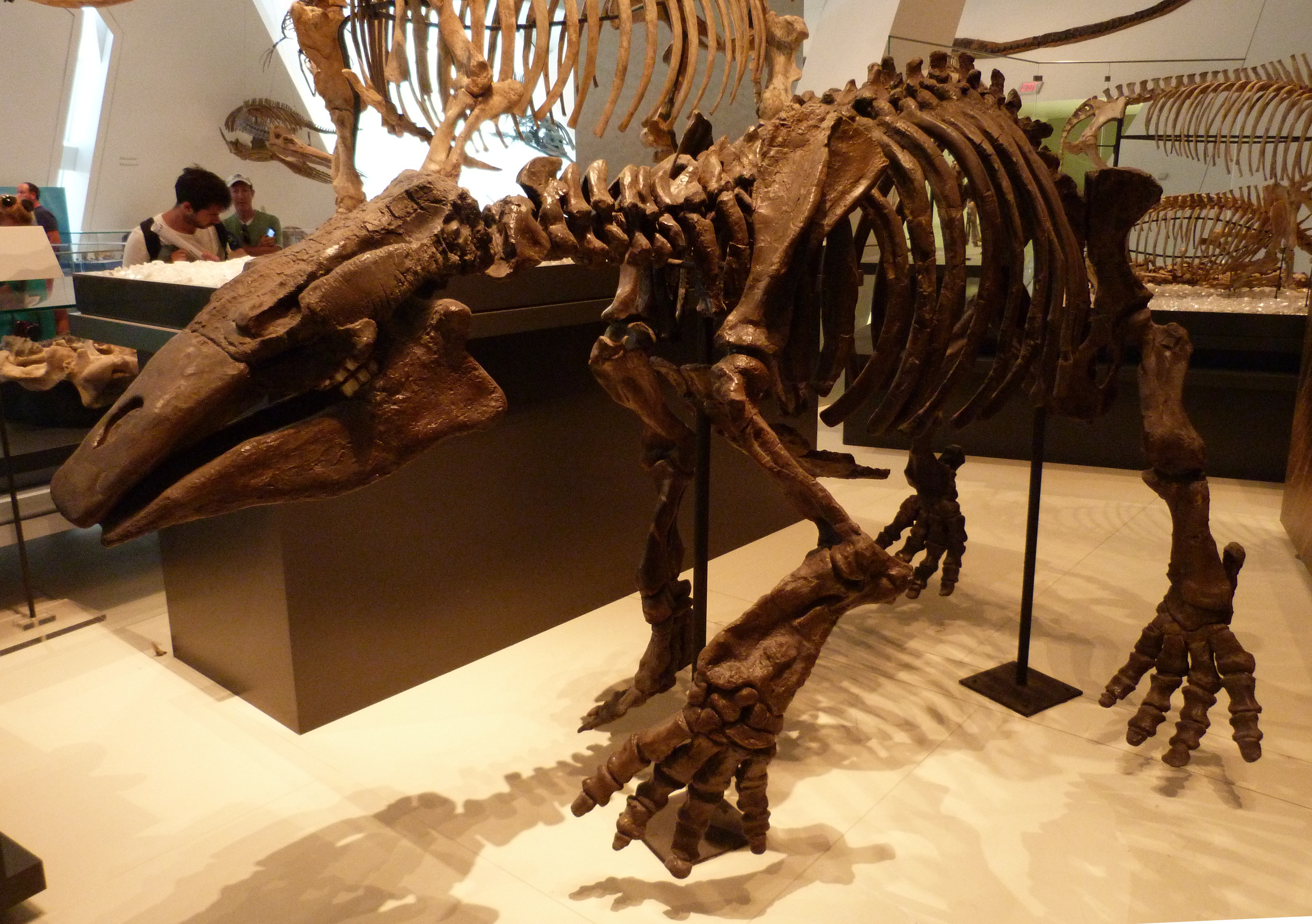
- Desmostylus, Royal Ontario Museum
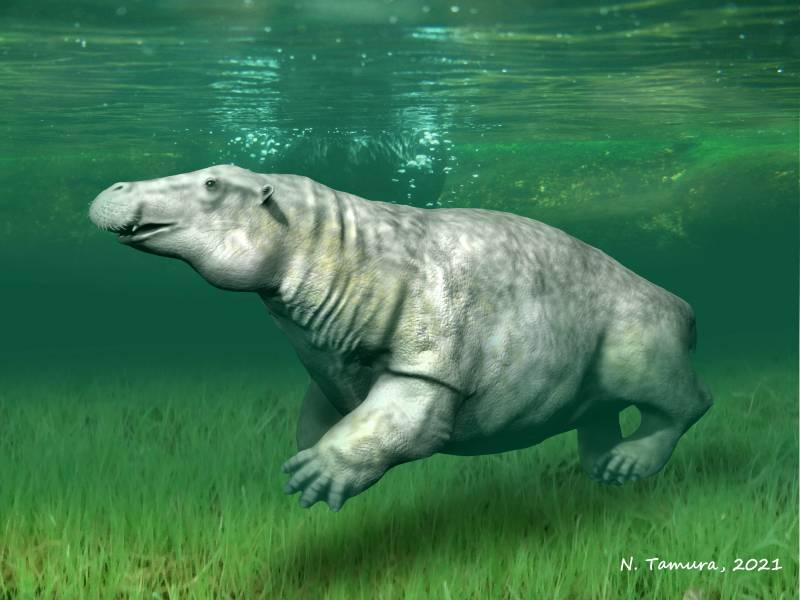
- Restoration of D. hesperus

Scientific classification
- Kingdom: Animalia
- Phylum: Chordata
- Class: Mammalia
- Infraclass: Placentalia
- Order: †Desmostylia
- Family: †Desmostylidae
- Genus: †Desmostylus; Marsh 1888

Species
- †D. hesperus (type) Marsh 1888; †D. coalingensis Reinhart 1959; †D. japonicus Tokunaga & Iwasaki 1914

Synonyms
- †Vanderhoofius coalingensis

= Desmostylus =

Desmostylus Temporal range: Early to Late Miocene (Aquitanian to Tortonian) 23.03–11 Ma

Extinct family of mammals

Desmostylus is an extinct genus of herbivorous mammal of the family Desmostylidae living from the Early Miocene and went extinct during the Late Miocene from 23.03 to 11 Ma.

== Description ==
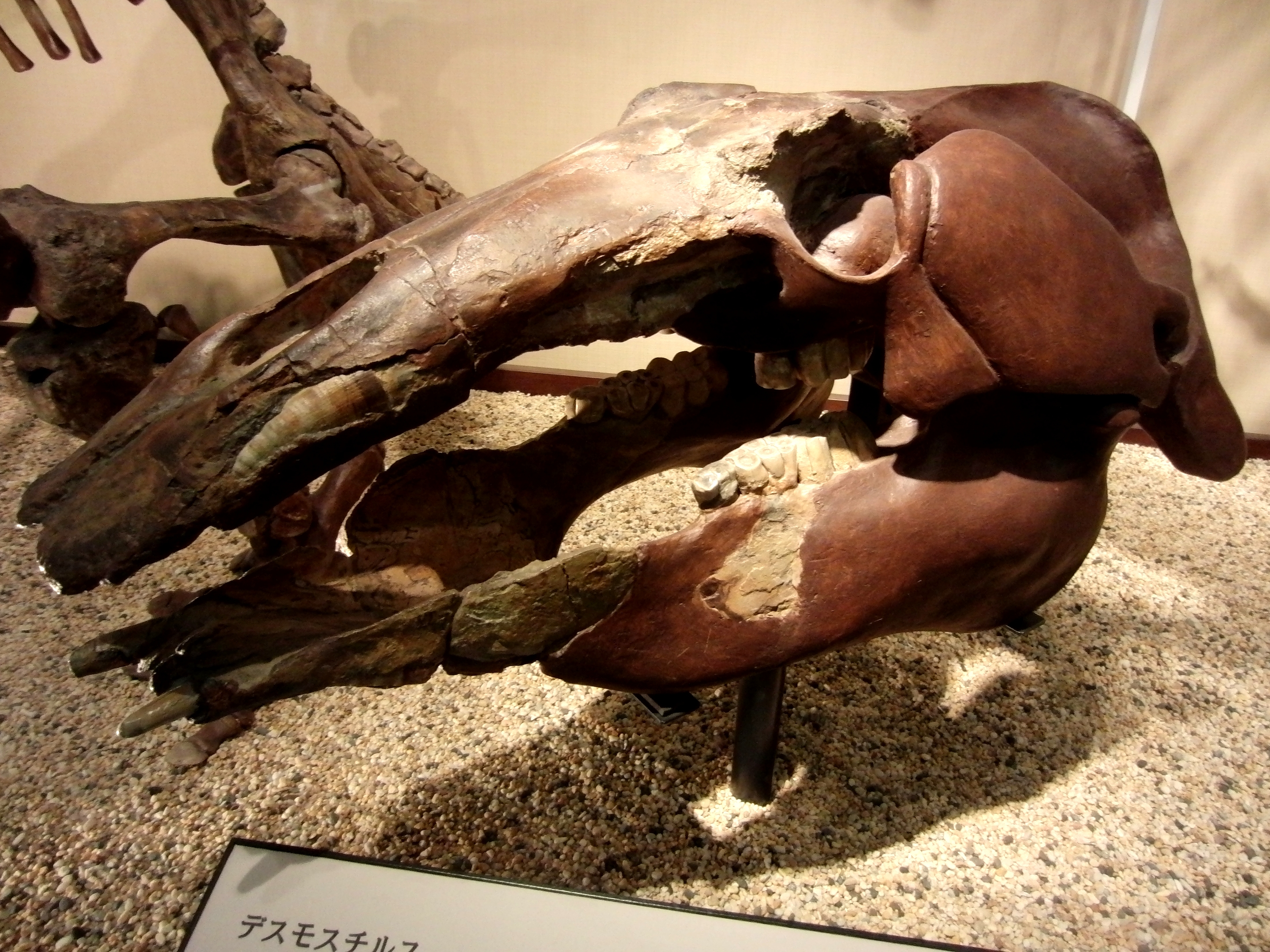
Skull of D. japonicus at the National Museum of Nature and Science, Tokyo, Japan. Holotype

Desmostylus was a large, hippopotamus-like creature, with the adult Keton specimen of D. hesperus measuring 275 cm (9.02 ft) in length, 105 cm (3.44 ft) in height and 1,283 kilograms (2,829 lb) in body mass; the largest known humerus, which is 1.3 times that of the Keton specimen in length, probably belonged to an individual with a mass of 2.8 metric tons (3.1 short tons). It had a short tail and powerful legs with four hooves. The animal's jaws were elongated and sported forward-facing tusks, which were elongated canines and incisors.

Most likely fully aquatic, Desmostylus is thought to have lived in shallow water in coastal regions, usually less than 30 meters deep. Recent isotope work indicates that Desmostylus more likely lived (or spent a large amount of time) in freshwater or estuary ecosystems foraging for aquatic freshwater plants.

Its less dense bone structure suggests that Desmostylus had a lifestyle of active swimming and possibly feeding at the surface, unlike other desmostylians that were primarily slow swimmers and/or bottom walkers and sea grass feeders.

== Species ==
Desmostylus hesperus (synonyms and invalid names: D. watasei, D. cymatias, D. californicus, D. mirabilis, D. minor, Desmostylella typica), D. coalingensis (syn. Vanderhoofius coalingensis), and D. japonicus.

Marsh 1888 named the type specimen D. hesperus based on a set of isolated teeth that had been found near Mission San Jose, California (type locality: 37.6°N 121.9°W, paleocoordinates 36.8°N 117.6°W). Marsh described his specimen as a sirenian and proposed affinities with Metaxytherium (a genus of extinct dugongs) and Halicore (an obsolete name for dugong).

Several other species were later described based on minor differences in tooth morphology. Most or all of these species have been synonymized with D. hesperus since variation in tooth morphology between individuals assigned to one of these species has proven to be to greater than the differences between species.

Desmostylus japonicus was described by Yoshiwara & Iwasaki 1902 based on a well-preserved partial skull and named by Tokunaga & Iwasaki 1914. It has been reproposed as distinct species based on cranial morphology.

== Fossil distribution ==
Fossils have been discovered from along the northern Pacific Rim from Baja California Peninsula northward along the coast of California, Oregon, Washington and west to Sakhalin Island, Hokkaido, and south to the Shimane Prefecture.
