= Amblypoda =

Polyphyletic group of extinct mammals

Amblypoda was a taxonomic hypothesis uniting a group of extinct, herbivorous mammals. They were considered a suborder of the primitive ungulate mammals and have since been shown to represent a polyphyletic group.

== Characteristics ==
The Amblypoda take their name from their short and stumpy feet, which were furnished with five toes each and supported massive pillar-like limbs. The brain cavity was extremely small and insignificant in comparison to the bodily mass, which was equal to that of the largest rhinoceroses. These animals were descendants of the small ancestral ungulates that retained all the primitive characteristics of the latter, accompanied by a huge increase in body size.

The Amblypoda were confined to the Paleocene and Eocene periods and occurred in North America, Asia (especially Mongolia) and Europe. The cheek teeth were short-crowned (brachyodont), with the tubercles more-or-less completely fused into transverse ridges, or cross-crests (lophodont type), and the total number of teeth was in one case the typical 44, but in another was fewer. The vertebra of the neck unite on nearly flat surfaces, the humerus had lost the foramen, or perforation, at the lower end, and the third trochanter to the femur may have also been wanting. In the forelimb, the upper and lower series of carpal (finger) bones scarcely alternated, but in the hind foot, the astragalus overlapped the cuboid, while the fibula, which was quite distinct from the tibia (as was the radius from the ulna in the forelimb), articulated with both astragalus and calcaneum.

== Types of amblypods ==
The most generalized type was Coryphodon, representing the family Coryphodontidae, from the lower Eocene of Europe and North America, in which there were 44 teeth and no horn-like excrescences on the long skull, while the femur had a third trochanter. The canines were somewhat elongated and were followed by a short gap in each jaw, and the cheek-teeth were adapted for succulent food. The length of the body reached about six feet in some cases.

In the middle Eocene formations of North America occurred the more specialized Uintatherium (or Dinoceras), typifying the family Uintatheriidae. Uintatheres were huge creatures with long narrow skulls, of which the elongated facial portion carried three pairs of bony horn-cores, probably covered with short horns in life, the hind-pair having been much the largest. The dental formula was i. 0/3, c. 1/1, p. 3/3·4, m. 3/3, the upper canines having been long sabre-like weapons, protected by a descending flange on each side of the lower front jaw.

In the basal Eocene of North America, the Amblypoda were represented by extremely primitive, five-toed, small ungulates such as Periptychus and Pantolambda, each of these typifying a family. The full typical series of 44 teeth was developed in each, but whereas in the Periptychidae, the upper molars were bunodont and tritubercular, in the Pantolambdidae, they had assumed a selenodont structure. Creodont characters were displayed in the skeleton.

== Current taxonomy of animals once classified in Amblypoda ==
Few authorities recognize Amblypoda in modern classifications. The following mammals were once considered part of this group:

- Order Pantodonta
  - Family Wangliidae
  - Family Harpyodidae
  - Family Bemalambdidae
  - Family Pastoralodontidae
  - Family Titanoideidae
  - Family Pantolambdidae (including Pantolambda)
  - Family Barylambdidae
  - Family Cyriacotheriidae
  - Family Pantolambdodontidae
  - Family Coryphodontidae (including Coryphodon)
- Order Dinocerata
  - Family Uintatheriidae (includes Uintatherium, Eobasileus, Tetheopsis, etc. Gobiatherium is sometimes placed in its own family.)
- a part of the order Condylarthra, mainly the family Periptychidae (including Periptychus)
