= Crustulus =

Crustulus Temporal range: Early Palaeocene

Scientific classification
- Kingdom: Animalia
- Phylum: Chordata
- Class: Mammalia
- Order: †Pantodonta
- Genus: †Crustulus; Clemens, 2017
- Species: †C. fontanus

Binomial name
- †Crustulus fontanus Clemens, 2017

Extinct genus of mammals

Crustulus is an extinct genus of pantodont that lived in what is now Montana during the Early Palaeocene. It is known from a single species, Crustulus fontanus.

== Description ==
Crustulus has been noted as having very similar dentistry to Alcidedorbignya.

Crustulus fontanus is one of the smallest known paleodonts.
