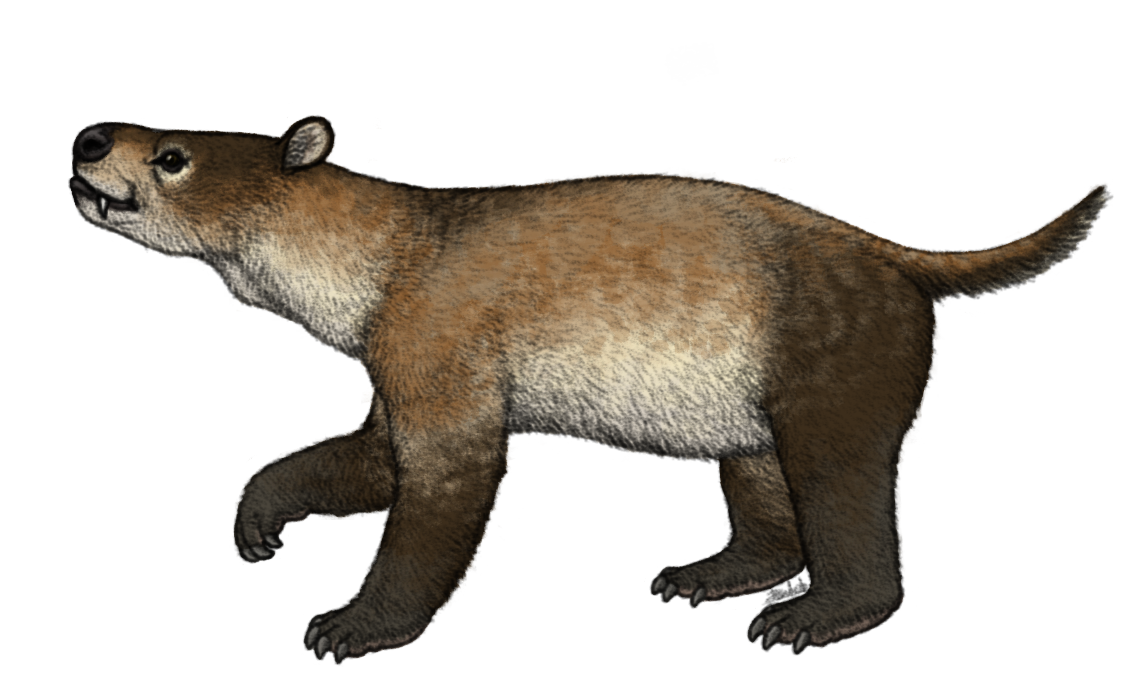
- Life restoration of T. primaevus

Scientific classification
- Kingdom: Animalia
- Phylum: Chordata
- Class: Mammalia
- Order: †Pantodonta
- Superfamily: †Pantolambdoidea
- Family: †Titanoideidae; Patterson, 1934
- Genus: †Titanoides; Gidley, 1917

Type species
- †Titanoides primaevus Gidley, 1917

Species
- T. gidleyi Jepsen, 1930; T. looki (Patterson, 1939); T. major Simons, 1960; T. nanus Gingerich, 1996; T. primaevus Gidley, 1917

Synonyms
- Sparactolambda Patterson, 1939

= Titanoides =

Titanoides Temporal range: Late Paleocene (Tiffanian 2 – Clarkforkian 2), 59–56 Ma

Extinct genus of mammals

Titanoides is an extinct genus of pantodont mammal which lived in western North America during the late Paleocene (Tiffanian 2 to Clarkforkian 2 ages). It was a medium-sized pantodont which weighed up to 150 kg (330 lb). It was one of the largest mammals in its habitat, a tropical swampland where the main predators were semiaquatic reptiles such as crocodilians and choristoderes.

Titanoides looked similar to a bear in size and stance, though it has no close living relatives. The skull is proportionally large, the tail is short, and the neck is thick and muscular. Its canine teeth are distinctive: the upper canines are saber-like (very long from top-to-bottom), while the lower canines are shaped like hooked blades (with a long base from front-to-back). The limbs are strong and stocky, with five digits on each paw. The rear paws are not fully preserved, but the front paws have narrow curved claws rather than hoofs, unlike other pantodonts. Despite their fearsome canines, the shape of the postcanine teeth (premolars and molars) indicate that Titanoides were probably herbivores. The claws and canines may have been used to dig up and slice through roots and tubers.

== Discovery and species ==
Footprints attributed to Titanoides are known from the Firkanten Formation of Svalbard. These footprints are classified as the ichnospecies Thulitheripus svalbardii.

=== T. primaevus ===
Titanoides primaevus, the type species of Titanoides, was named by Gidley (1917) for a few lower jaw fragments discovered in the Williston Basin, near Buford, North Dakota. These initial fragments were discovered in 1913 by Vernon Bailey, who collected from the Sentinel Butte Formation. Gidley noted that it was "by far the largest mammal yet known from the Paleocene". Its large size and the shape of its molar teeth reminded him of brontotheres, a family of hoofed mammals which he referred to as titanotheres. He established the name Titanoides in reference to the similarity.

The exact site of Bailey's discovery was elusive for decades before being relocated by Princeton University paleontologists in 1951. They were able to collect many more fossils of a Titanoides skull, probably the same exact individual which the original jaw fragments came from.

T. primaevus fossils are also known from Alberta, Saskatchewan (specifically the Roche Percée local fauna in the Ravenscrag Formation), and the Bison Basin of Fremont County, Wyoming. Sites preserving T. primaevus fossils are generally considered to be Tiffanian 4 in age.

=== T. gidleyi ===
Titanoides gidleyi was named by Jepsen (1930) for fossils from the Silver Coulee beds (Fort Union Formation) in the Bighorn Basin of Wyoming. It is a medium-sized species which is slightly older than T. primaevus, dating to the Tiffanian 3.

Simpson (1937) named another Titanoides species, Titanoides zeuxis, from the Melville Formation in the Crazy Mountain Basin near Melville, Montana. It is a somewhat smaller species, also from the Tiffanian 3. Gingerich (1996) regarded T. zeuxis as a synonym of T. gidleyi. "T. zeuxis" fossils reported from the Black Peaks Formation of Texas may also represent fossils of T. gidleyi. Simons (1960) named another Titanoides species from the Crazy Mountain Basin, T. simpsoni, but later authors considered it to belong within Pantolambda instead.

=== T. looki ===
Titanoides looki was originally named as Sparactolambda looki by Patterson (1939), who was collecting on behalf of the Field Museum of Natural History. Patterson applied this name to well-preserved skull and postcranial fossils from the DeBeque Formation (Tiffanian 5 to Clarkforkian 1) in Plateau Valley, near De Beque, Colorado. Subsequent authors recognized "Sparactolambda" as a synonym of Titanoides, once more skull material of the latter was found in North Dakota. Simons (1960) regarded Sparactolambda looki as a synonym of T. primaevus in particular, with other Colorado Titanoides fossils referable to T. zeuxis. Gingerich (1996) argued that T. looki was still distinct enough to be considered its own species within Titanoides. In any case, the best Titanoides fossils are represented by Patterson's Colorado collection.

Prior to naming "Sparactolambda", Patterson reported collecting numerous Titanoides fossils from the Plateau Valley area through the 1930s. However, in 1937 he classified these earlier finds as a different pantodont genus, Barylambda.

=== T. major ===
T. major was named by Simons (1960) for a single lower jaw fossil from the Silver Coulee beds in the Bighorn Basin of Wyoming. It appears to be the largest known Titanoides species and one of the oldest (Tiffanian 2 in age).

=== T. nanus ===
T. nanus was named by Gingerich (1996) for lower jaw fossils from the Clarks Fork Basin, a small offshoot of the Bighorn Basin at the north edge of Wyoming. T. nanus is the youngest known Titanoides species (Clarkforkian 2 in age) as well as the smallest, with its teeth measuring about 10-25% smaller than other species.
