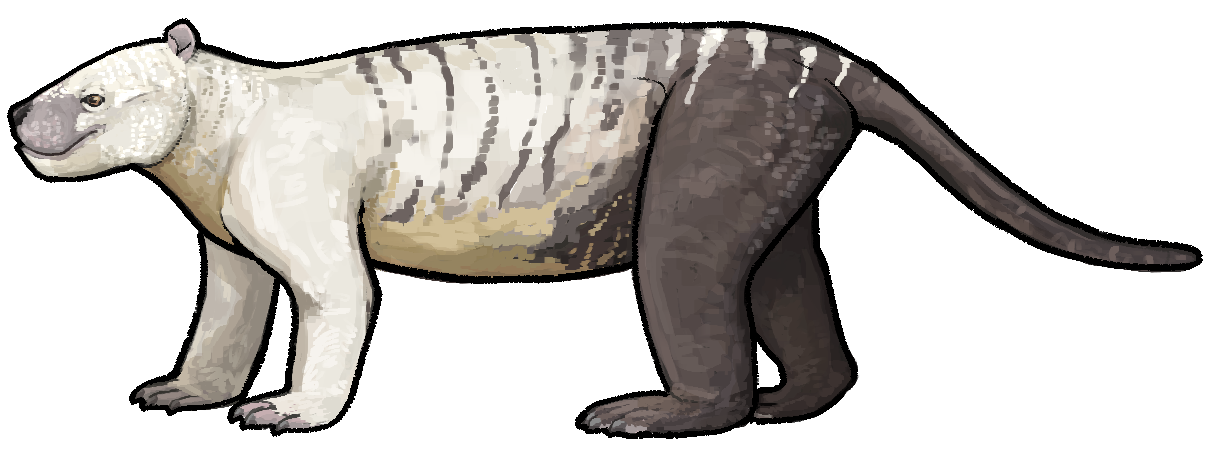
- picture of Nanxiongilambda

Scientific classification
- Kingdom: Animalia
- Phylum: Chordata
- Class: Mammalia
- Order: †Pantodonta
- Family: †Pantolambdidae
- Genus: †Nanxiongilambda
- Species: †N. yei

Binomial name
- †Nanxiongilambda yei Quan & Wang, 2024

= Nanxiongilambda =

Nanxiongilambda Temporal range: Palaeocene

Extinct genus of pantolambdid

Nanxiongilambda is an extinct genus of pantolambdid that lived during the Palaeocene epoch.

== Distribution ==
Nanxiongilambda yei is found in the Nongshan Formation of China.
