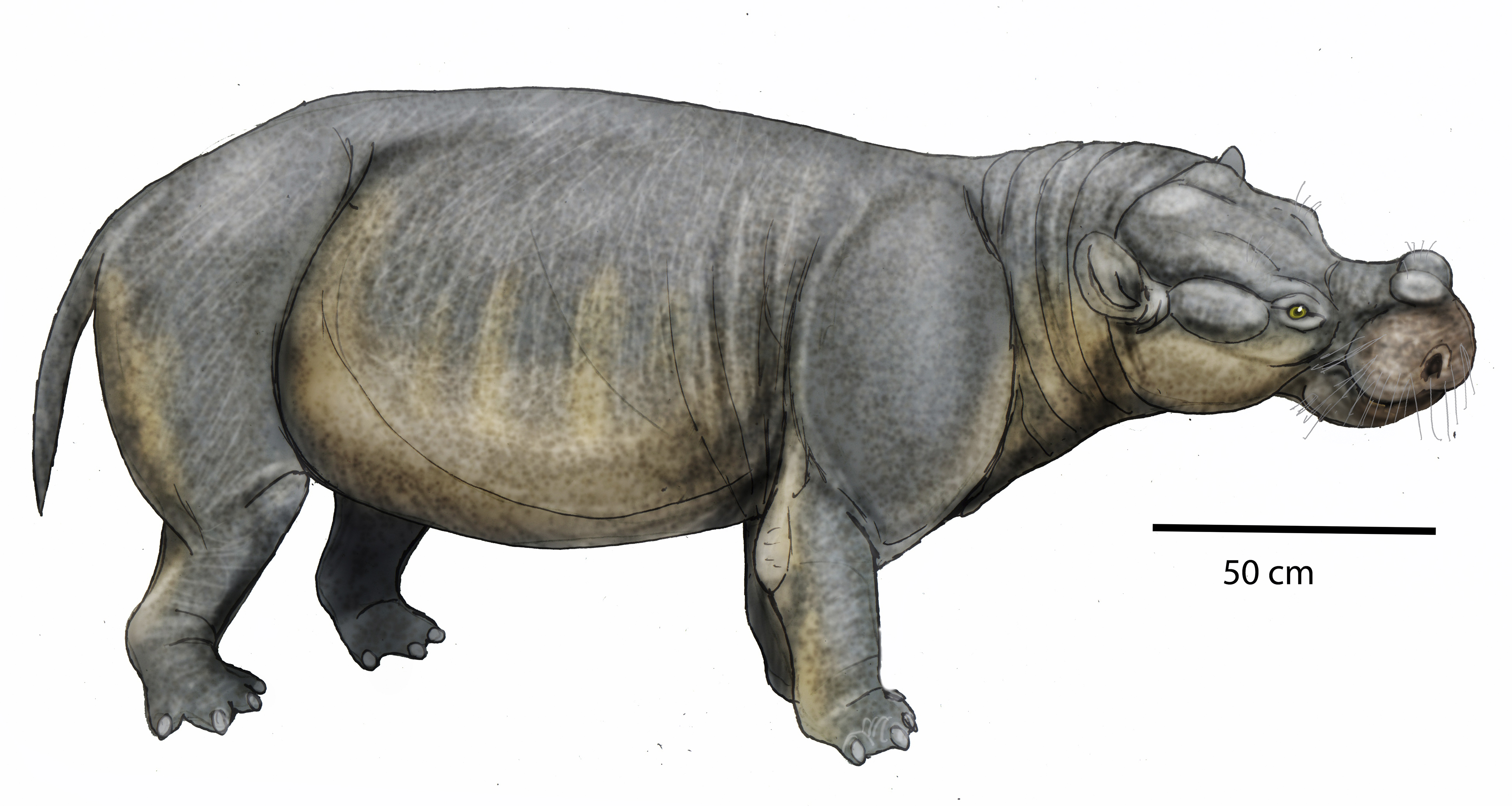
- Restoration of Eudinoceras mongoliensis

Scientific classification
- Kingdom: Animalia
- Phylum: Chordata
- Class: Mammalia
- Order: †Pantodonta
- Family: †Coryphodontidae
- Genus: †Eudinoceras; Osborn, 1924

Type species
- †Eudinoceras mongoliensis Osborn, 1924

Species
- †E. crassum Tong & Tang, 1977; †E. mongoliensis Osborn, 1924; †E. sishuiensis Wang, 1994; †E. xintaiensis Mao & Wang, 2012; †E. youngi Mao & Wang, 2012; †E. zhichengensis Lei et al., 1987

Synonyms
- Metacoryphodon Q.i.Chow, 1982

= Eudinoceras =

Eudinoceras Temporal range: Eocene, 55.8–37.2 Ma

Fossil genus of Asian mammals

Eudinoceras is an extinct genus of pantodont in the family Coryphodontidae. The first fossils were discovered in the Irdin Manha Formation by palaeontologists Henry Fairfield Osborn and Roy Chapman Andrews in 1923, and were assigned to the genus Eudinoceras, due to both thinking it was a dinoceratan closely related to Dinoceras (now known as Uintatherium). As more complete specimens were recovered, the animal was identified as a pantodont more related to the genus Coryphodon.

Eudinoceras was described from 2 premolars & jaw elements. However, more teeth and fragmentary skull material have been found throughout Mongolia and China.

== Description ==
Eudinoceras mongoliensis was a large pantodont, reaching 2.5 m (8 ft 2 in) in length and weighing around 800 kg (1,800 lb). Histological study of molar enamel samples show that E. mongoliensis was comparable to a white rhinoceros in lifestyle.

== Paleoecology ==
Fossils of Eudinoceras are primarily known from the Irdin Manha and Arshanto Formations. It may have coexisted with the artiodactyls Andrewsarchus mongoliensis and Erlianhyus primitivus, the dinoceratan Gobiatherium mirificum, the oxyaenid Sarkastodon mongoliensis, the mesonychians Hapalodectes serus, Harpagolestes leei, and Mongolonyx dolichognathus, the paraceratheriids Forstercooperia totadenta and Pappaceras confluens, the lophialetid Lophialetes expeditus, the brontotheres Gnathotitan berkeyi, and the crocodilian Asiatosuchus grangeri.
