= Leptolambda =

Leptolambda Temporal range: Paleocene

Scientific classification
- Domain: Eukaryota
- Kingdom: Animalia
- Phylum: Chordata
- Class: Mammalia
- Order: †Pantodonta
- Family: †Barylambdidae
- Genus: †Leptolambda; Patterson & Simons, 1958

Type species
- Leptolambda schmidti Patterson & Simons, 1958

Species
- L. schmidti; L. churchilli

Extinct genus of mammals

Leptolambda is an extinct genus of pantodonts in the family Barylambdidae from North America.
