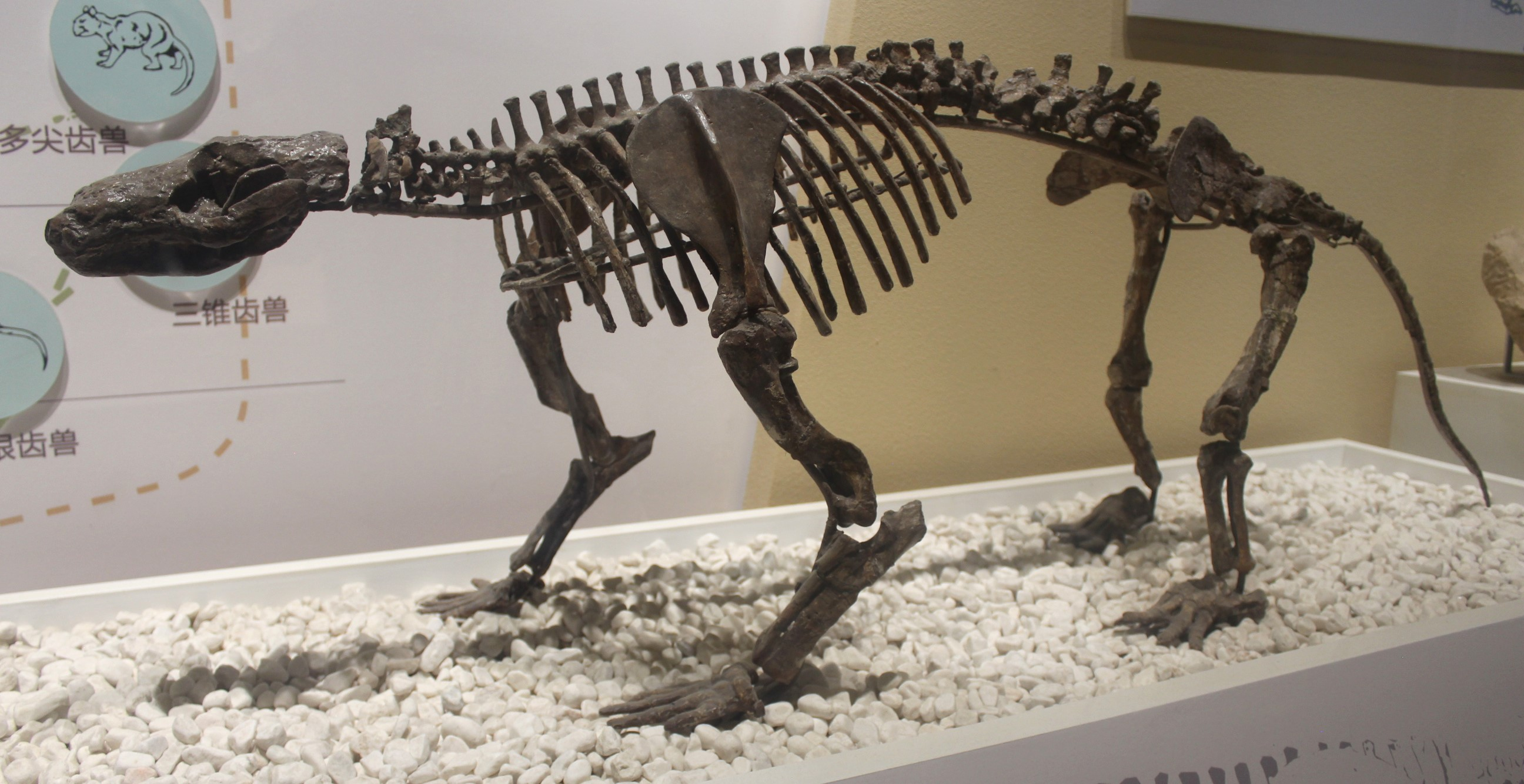
- Skeleton of B. nanhsiungensis, National Natural History Museum of China

Scientific classification
- Kingdom: Animalia
- Phylum: Chordata
- Class: Mammalia
- Order: †Pantodonta
- Family: †Bemalambdidae
- Genus: †Bemalambda; Chow et al., 1973

Type species
- Bemalambda nanhsiungensis Chow et al., 1973

= Bemalambda =

Extinct genus of mammals

Bemalambda (meaning "stepped lambda") is a genus of extinct mammal, belonging to the pantodonts. It lived in the lower-middle Paleocene (about 63–58 million years ago) and the fossil remains have been found in China.

== Description ==
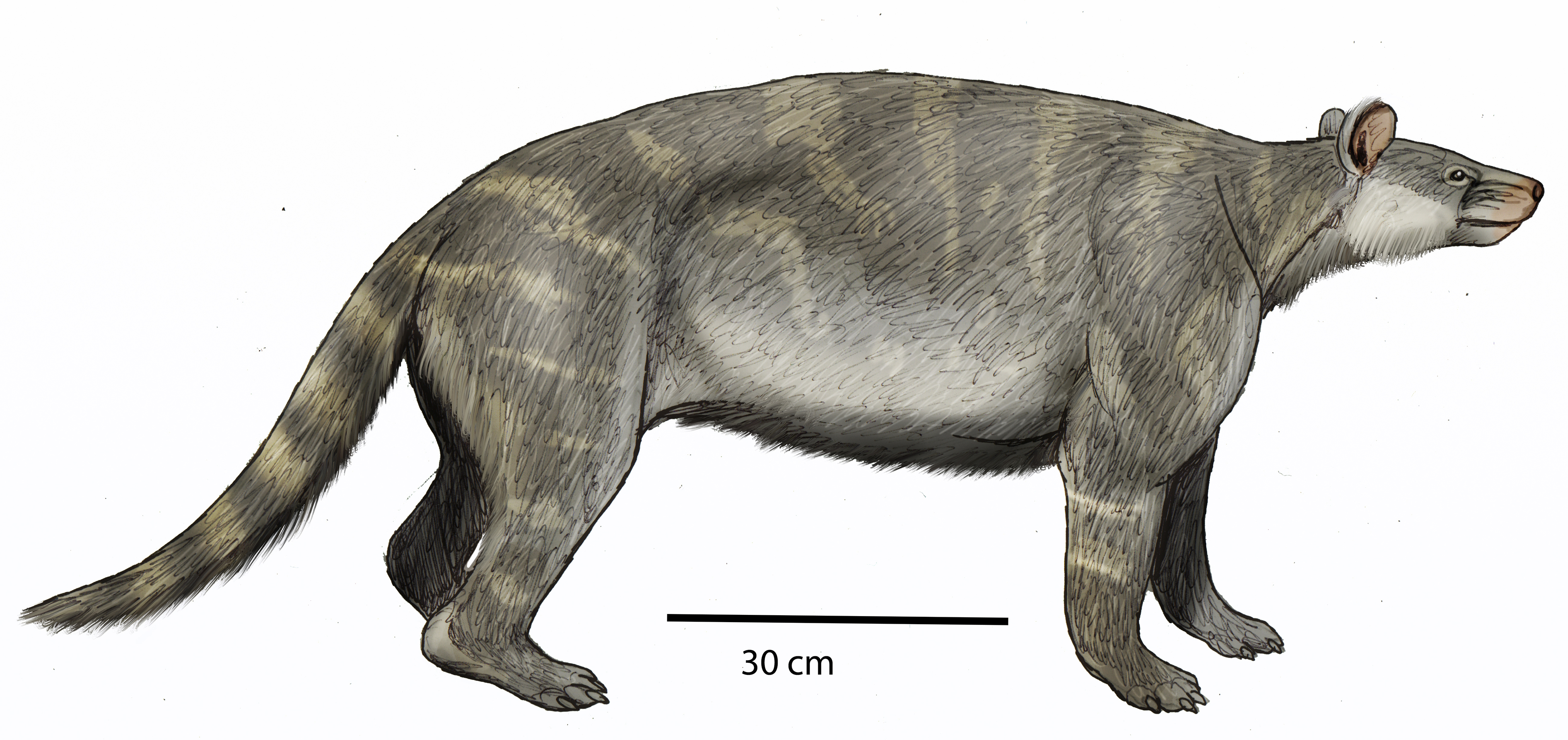
Life restoration

It was a medium-sized animal, comparable in size to a large dog. The body was robust, with a short tail and strong, muscular legs. The skull was short and low, featuring a broad muzzle, swollen zygomatic processes, and a relatively small size. The temporal fossae were deep, the sagittal crest prominent, and the coronoid process on the mandible was very high; these characteristics indicate a more developed temporal musculature (useful for chewing) than that of the subsequent pantodonts.

Like all pantodonts, Bemalambda had upper premolars with V-shaped ectolofi; the upper molars, however, had a transverse structure, almost zalambdodonte, with closely paired paracone and metaconus, and did not possess the dilambdodont W-shaped structure like the typical pantodonts. The stylar platform of the teeth from the third premolar to the third molar was very broad, and the ectoflexus (an additional external indentation of the molars) was deeply incised.

== Classification ==
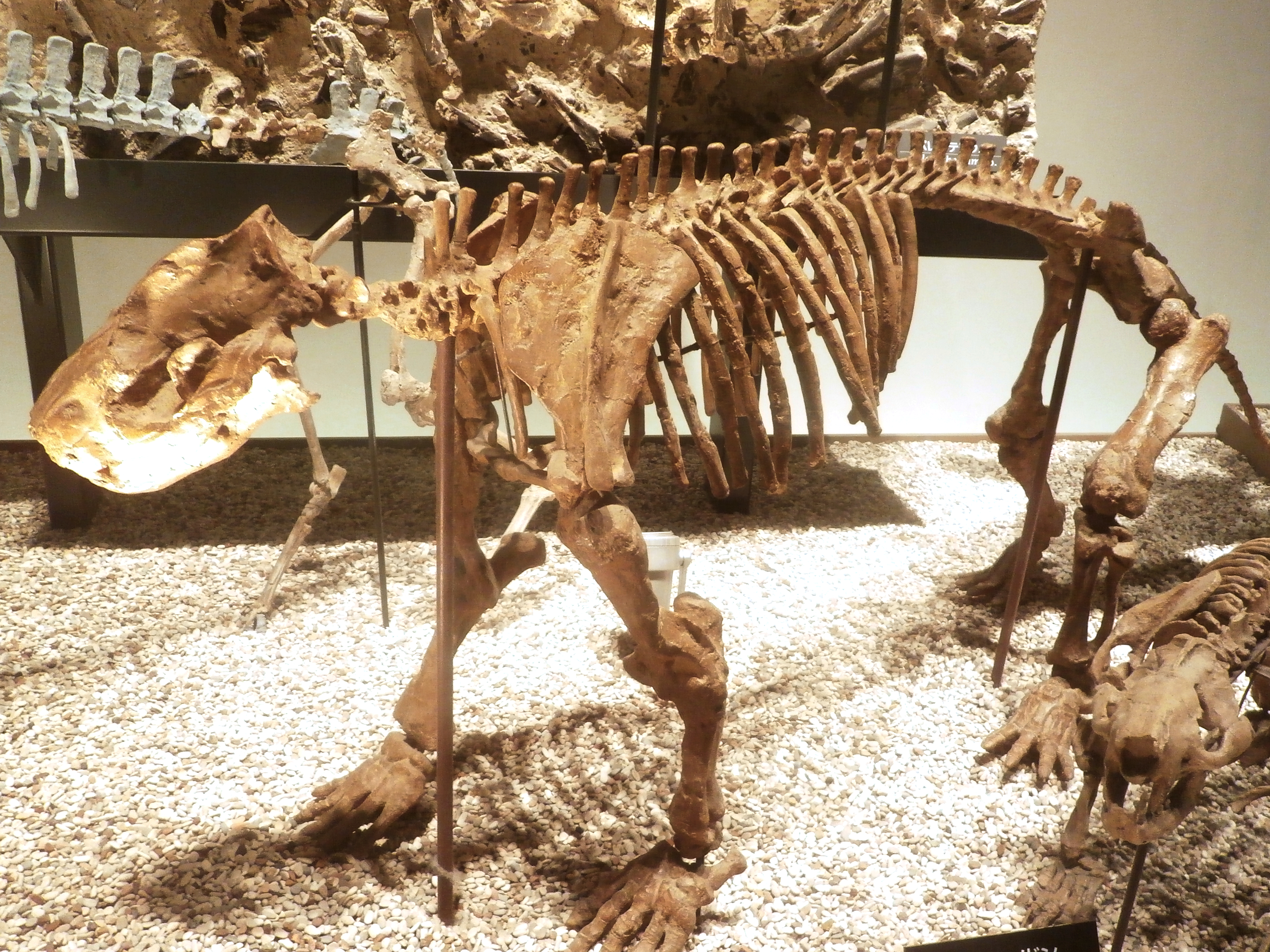
Skeleton of B. pachyoesteus

The genus Bemalambda was established in 1973 on the basis of some fossils found in the area of Nanxiong in the Lofochai formation (Guangdong, China), dating back to the lower/middle Paleocene. The study by Chow and colleagues established various species: Bemalambda crassa, Bemalambda nanhsiungensis (the type species), Bemalambda pachyoesteus, distinguished on the basis of some dental characteristics. Subsequently, in Jiangxi, fossils of a slightly more recent species (Middle Paleocene) were found, B. dingae.

Bemalambda is a rather atypical representative of the pantodonts, a group of archaic mammals with the characteristic ambdodon teeth. In particular, Bemalambda and other related forms such as Hypsilolambda would seem to be part of a radiation of primitive pantodonts of relatively modest size, developed in the Asian Paleocene, the Bemalambdidae . Probably close to this group were other small animals, such as Harpyodus and Alcidedorbignya.

== Paleoecology ==
The representatives of the Bemalambda genus were animals with a strong and robust build, with a herbivorous or perhaps omnivorous diet. The strong legs, in particular the humerus, indicate a propensity for digging.

== Bibliography ==
- M. M. Chow, Y.-P. Chang, B.-Y. Wang and S.-Y. Ting. 1973. New mammalian genera and species from the Paleocene of Nanhsiung, N. Kwangtung. Vertebrata PalAsiatica 11(1):31–35
- Zhou, M., Y. Zhang, B. Wang, and S. Ding. 1977. Mammalian fauna from the Paleocene of Nanxiong Basin, Guangdong. Palaeontologia Sinica, new series C 20:1–100.
- C. de Muizon and L. G. Marshall. 1992. Alcidedorbignya inopinata (Mammalia: Pantodonta) from the Early Paleocene of Bolivia: Phylogenetic and Paleobiogeographic Implications. Journal of Paleontology 66(3):499–520
- Q. Li. 2005. New material of Bemalambda from Chijiang Basin in Jiangxi, China. Vertebrata PalAsiatica 43(4):325–329
