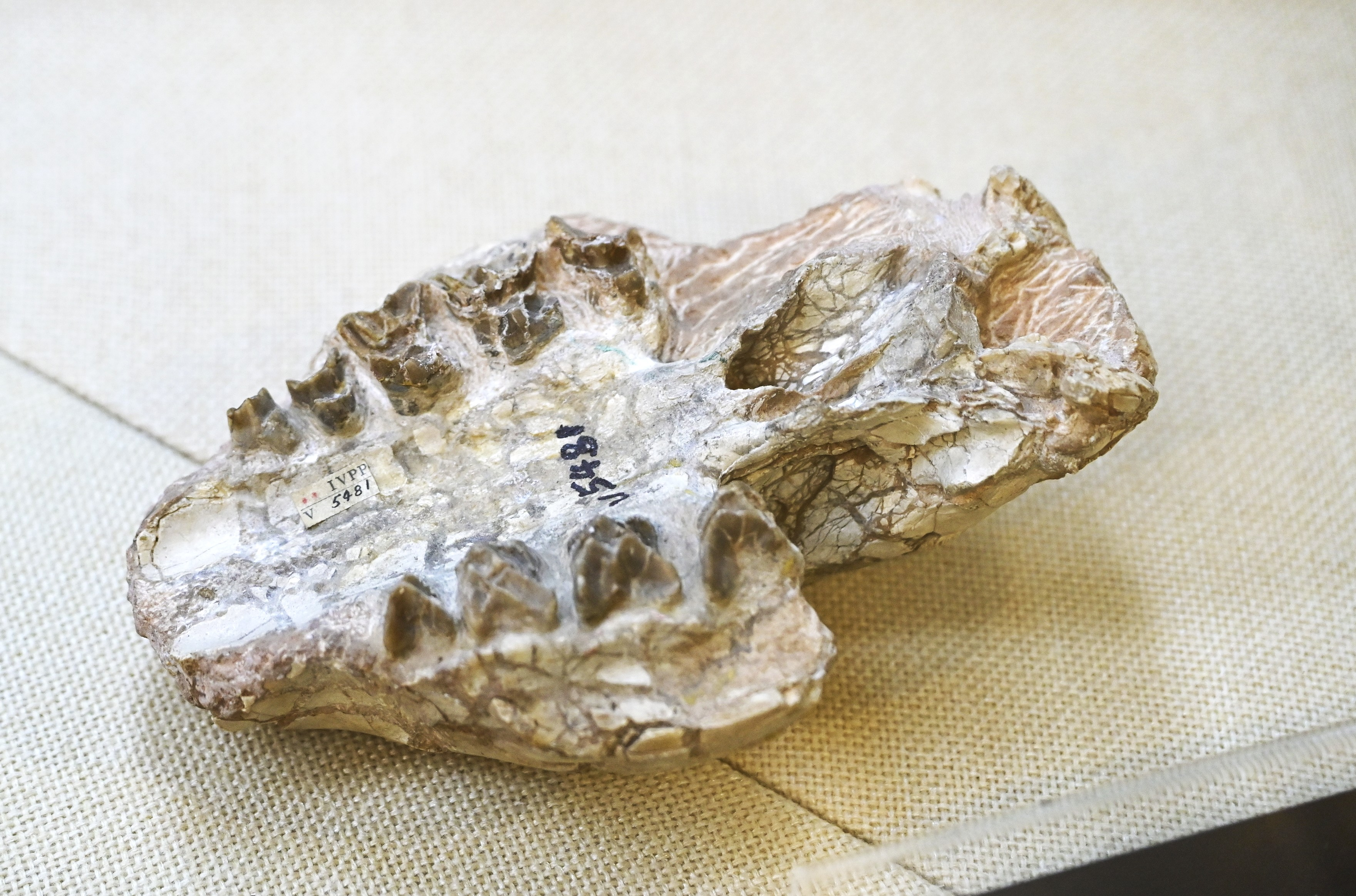
- Holotype of P. lacustris (IVPP V5481), Paleozoological Museum of China

Scientific classification
- Kingdom: Animalia
- Phylum: Chordata
- Class: Mammalia
- Infraclass: Placentalia
- Order: †Pantodonta
- Family: †Pastoralodontidae
- Genus: †Pastoralodon; Chow and Qi, 1978

Type species
- Pastoralodon lacustris

= Pastoralodon =

Pastoralodon Temporal range: Paleogene

Extinct genus of mammals

Pastoralodon is an extinct genus of pastoralodontid pantodont from the Palaeogene of East Asia. It is a monotypic genus known from a single species, P. lacustris.

== Distribution ==
P. lacustris fossils have been found in the Nomogen Formation, a geologic formation dating back to around the Palaeocene-Eocene boundary.
