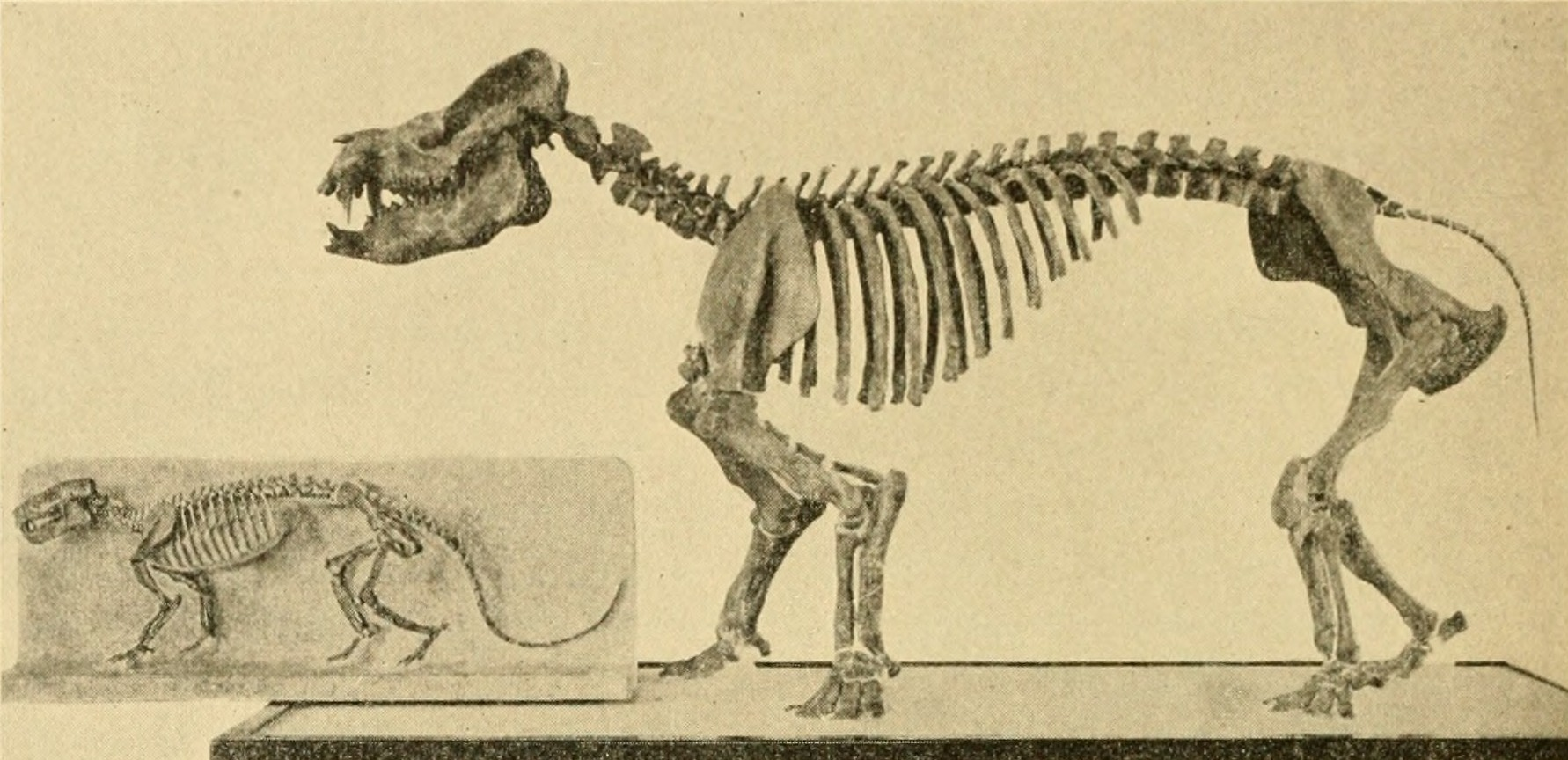
- Skeletons of Pantolambda (left) and Coryphodon (right)
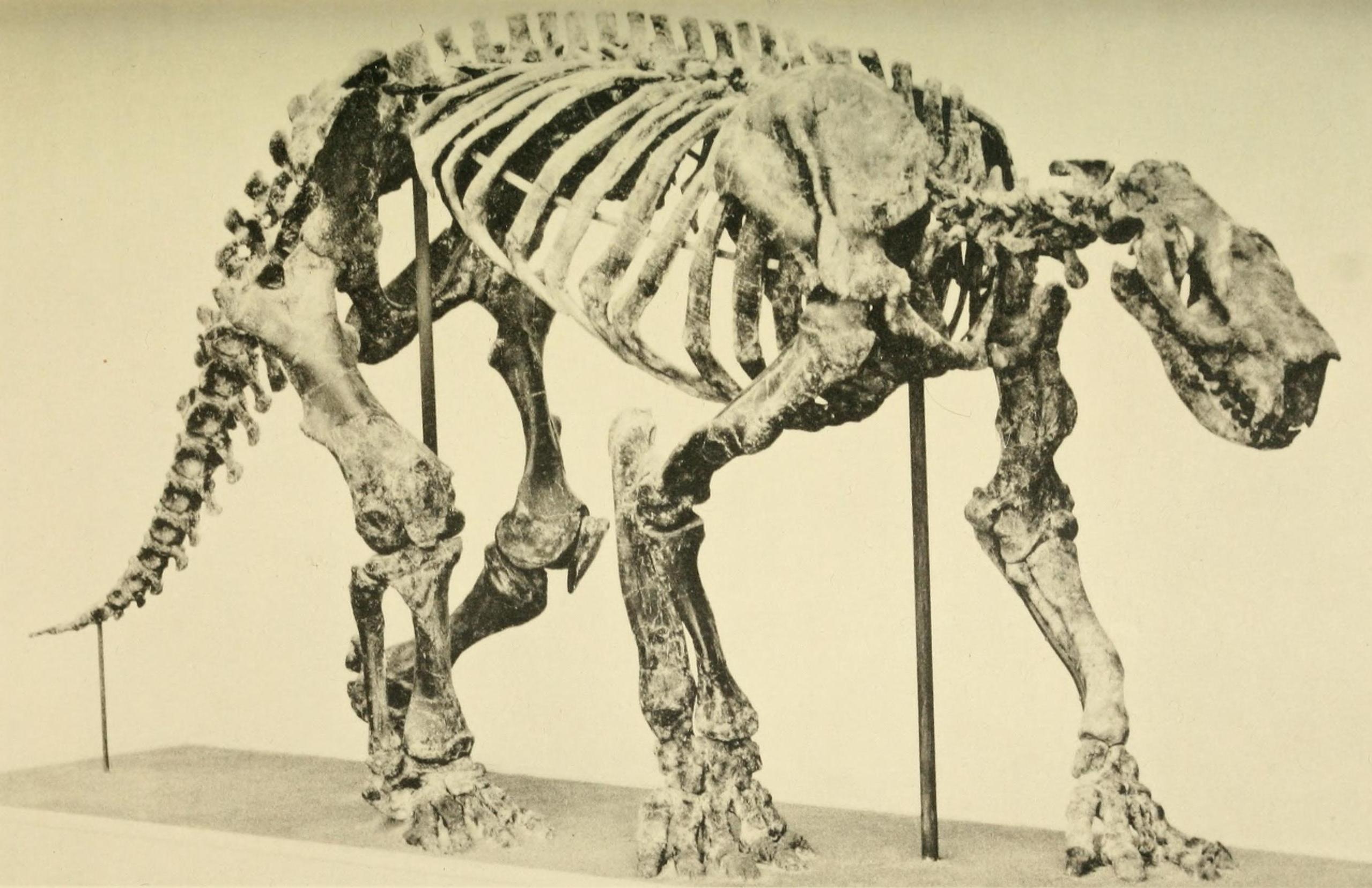
- Skeleton of Barylambda faberi

Scientific classification
- Kingdom: Animalia
- Phylum: Chordata
- Class: Mammalia
- Clade: Paraxonia
- Order: †Pantodonta; Cope 1873

Families
- †Alcidedorbignyidae; †Barylambdidae; †Bemalambdidae; †Coryphodontidae; †Harpyodidae; †Pantolambdidae; †Pantolambdodontidae; †Pastoralodontidae; †Titanoideidae; †?Cyriacotheriidae

= Pantodonta =

Pantodonta Temporal range: Paleocene - Eocene, 65–34 Ma

Extinct suborder of mammals

Pantodonta is an extinct order (or, according to some, a suborder) of eutherian mammals. These herbivorous mammals were one of the first groups of large mammals to evolve (around 66 million years ago) after the end of the Cretaceous. The last pantodonts died out at the end of the Eocene (around 34 million years ago).

Pantodonta include some of the largest mammals of their time, but were a diversified group, with some primitive members weighing less than 10 kg (22 lb) and the largest more than 500 kg (1,100 lb).

The earliest and most primitive pantodonts, Bemalambda (with a 20 cm (7.9 in) skull probably the size of a dog) and Hypsilolambda, appear in the early Paleocene Shanghuan Formation in China. All more derived families are collectively classified as Eupantodonta. The pantodonts appear in North America in the middle Paleocene, where Coryphodon survived into the middle Eocene. Pantodont teeth have been found in South America (Alcidedorbignya) and Antarctica, and footprints in a coal mine on Svalbard.

== Description ==
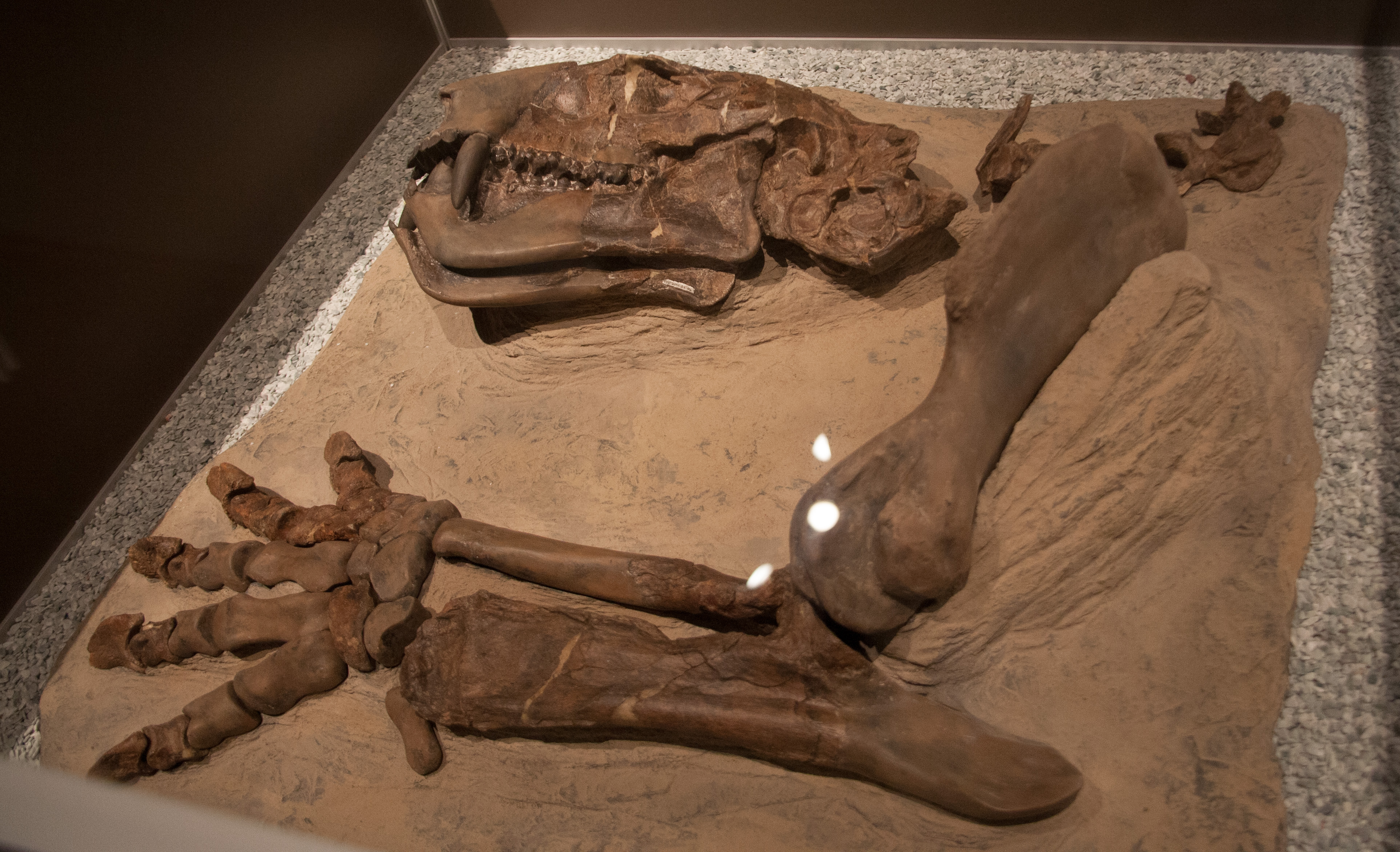
Undescribed specimen from the Paskapoo Formation

The pantodonts varied considerably in size: the small Archaeolambda, of which there is a complete skeleton from the Late Palaeocene of China, was probably arboreal, while the North American, ground sloth-like Barylambda was massive, slow-moving ("graviportal") and probably browsed on high vegetation.

=== Dentition ===
The pantodonts have a primitive dental formula (3.1.4.33.1.4.3) with little or no diastemata. Their most important synapomorphy are the zalambdodont (V-shaped ectoloph opening towards lip) P^{3–4} and (except in the most primitive families) dilambdodont (W-shaped ectoloph) upper molars. Most pantodonts lacked a hypocone (fourth cusp) and had small conules (additional small cusps). The incisors are small but the canines large, occasionally sabertooth-like. On P^{3}-M^{3} there is normally an ectoflexus (indentation on the outer side). Asian families can typically be distinguished from the American because their paracone and metacone (bottom of W on side of tongue) tend to be closer together.

The cheek teeth in the lower jaw are also dilambdodont, with broad, high metalophids (posterior crest) and tall metaconid (posterior-interior cusp) with much lower paracristids and small paraconids.

=== Postcranial skeleton ===
Pantodonts have plesiomorphic (unaltered) and robust postcranial skeletons. Their five-toed feet are often hoofed with the tarsals similar to those of ungulates, which feature had led to previously suggested ties to arctocyonid "condylarths", but this similarity is now considered primitive.

== Classification ==
The pantodonts were previously grouped with the ungulates as amblypods, paenungulates, or arctocyonids, but since McKenna & Bell 1997 they have been allied with the tillodonts and considered to be derived from the cimolestids. The interrelationship within Pantodonta is controversial, but, following McKenna & Bell 1997, it contains about two dozen genera in ten families. Most of the families are known from the Paleocene of either Asia or North America. The pantolambdodontids and coryphodontids survived into the Eocene and the latter are known from across the northern hemisphere. Some dental features can possibly link the most primitive pantodonts to the palaeoryctids, a group of small and insectivorous mammals that evolved during the Cretaceous. Recently a close relationship with Periptychidae has been suggested. This would make pantodonts crown-group ungulate placentals and not related to cimolestids at all.

Genera from North America tended to be large and robust, starting with Pantolambda and Caenolambda in the Middle Paleocene epoch, and later in the epoch started to get larger, with Barylambda as the largest Paleocene form of pantodont. However, Asian forms, such as Archaeolambda, tended to be thinner and less robust, around the size of a medium-sized dog. Only later in the Eocene, with Hypercoryphodon, did Asian pantodonts get large and robust.

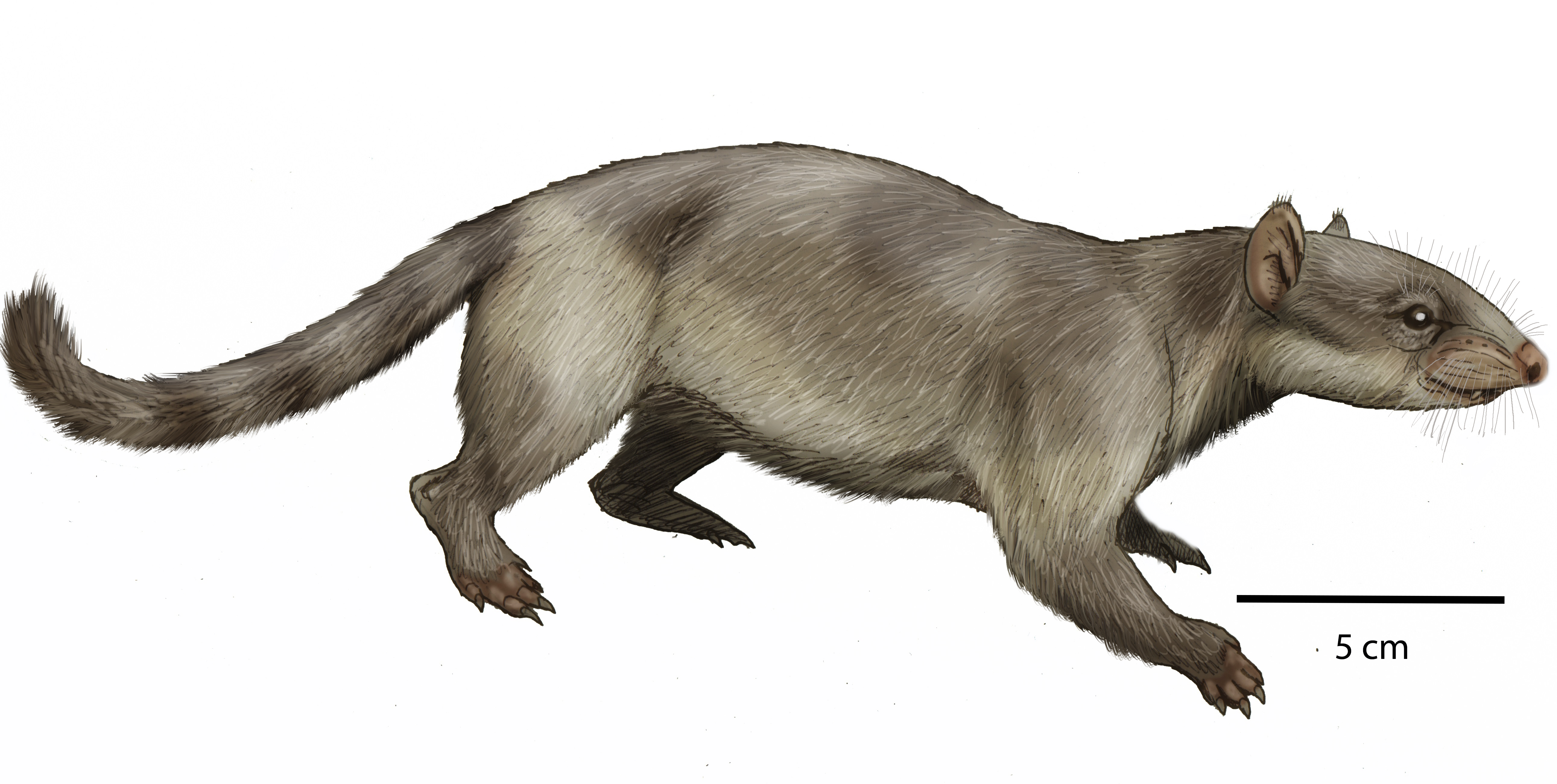
Life reconstruction of Alcidedorbignya inopinata

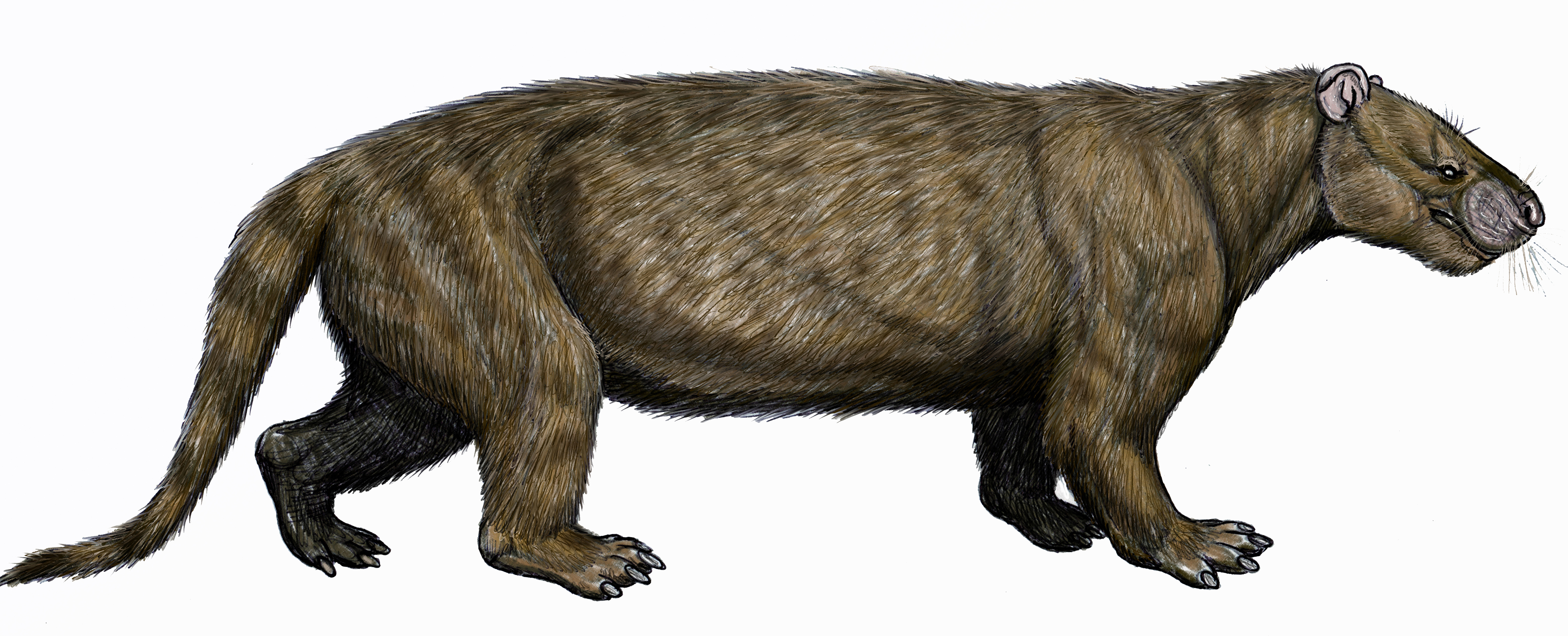
Life reconstruction of Pantolambda bathmodon

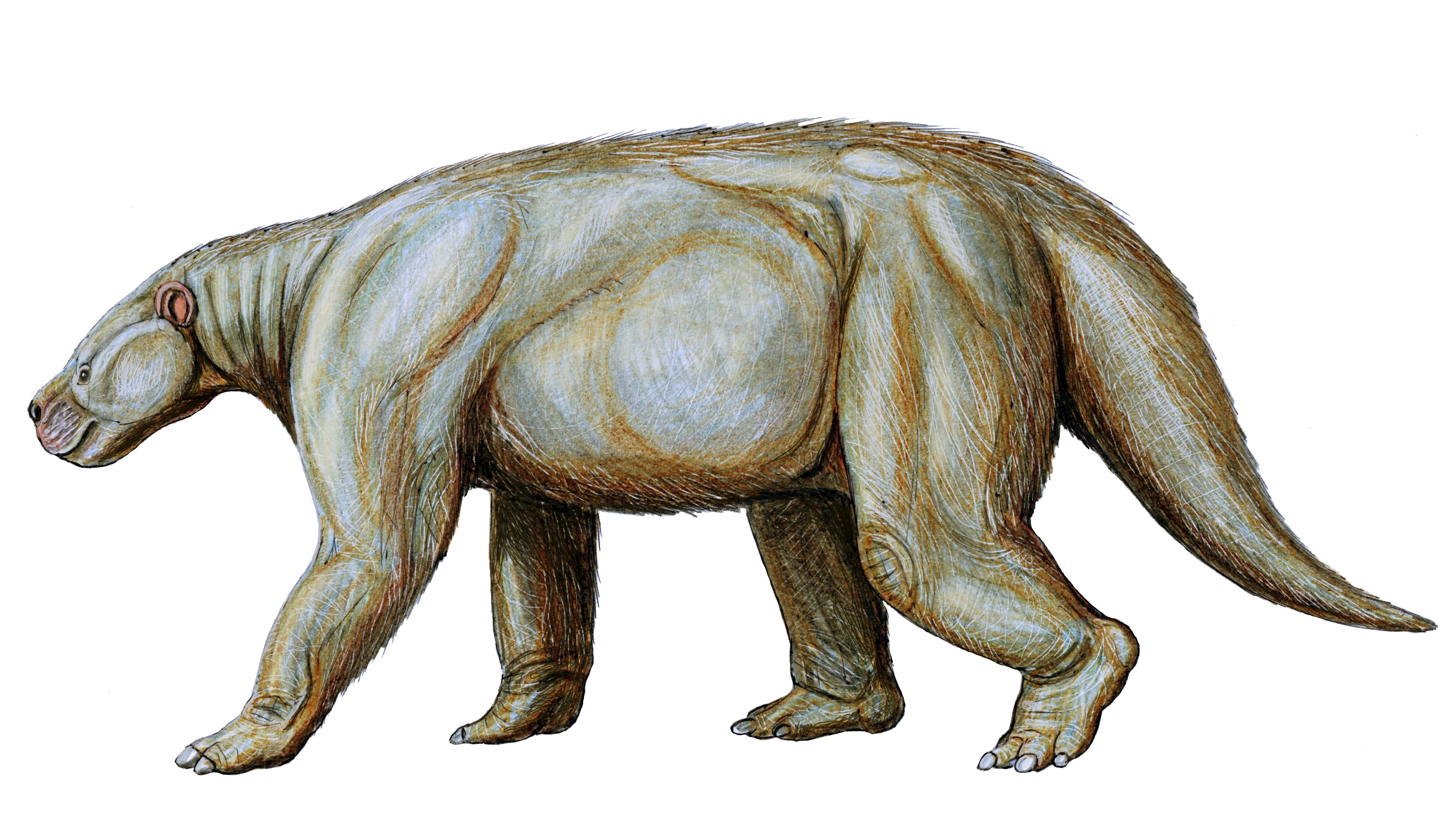
Life reconstruction of Barylambda faberi

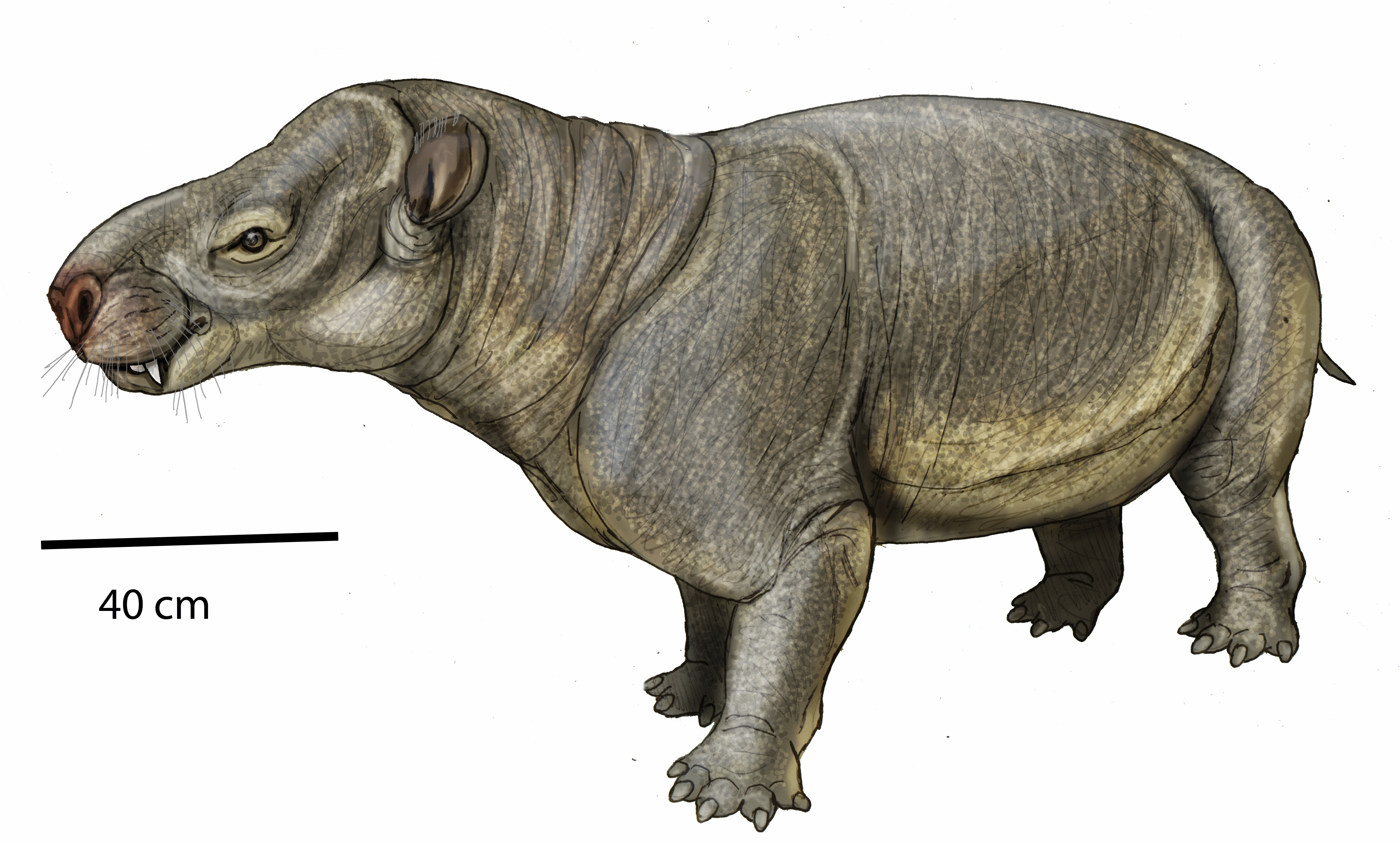
Life reconstruction of Asiocoryphodon conicus

The following taxa are recognized in Pantodonta:

- Order/Suborder Pantodonta Cope, 1873
  - Family Alcidedorbignyidae de Muizon & Marshall, 1987
    - Genus Alcidedorbignya de Muizon & Marshall, 1987
  - Family Barylambdidae Patterson, 1939
    - Genus Barylambda Patterson, 1937
    - Genus Haplolambda Patterson, 1939
    - Genus ?Ignatiolambda Simons, 1960
    - Genus ?Leptolambda Patterson & Simons, 1958
  - Family Bemalambdidae Chow et al., 1973
    - Genus Bemalambda Chow et al., 1973
    - Genus Hypsilolambda Wang, 1975
  - Family Coryphodontidae Marsh, 1876
    - Genus Asiocoryphodon Xu, 1976
    - Genus Coryphodon Owen, 1845
    - Genus Eudinoceras Osborn, 1924
    - Genus Heterocoryphodon Lucas & Tong, 1987
    - Genus Hypercoryphodon Osborn & Granger, 1932
    - Genus Wutucoryphodon Tong & Wang, 2006
  - Family Harpyodidae Wang, 1979
    - Genus Harpyodus Qiu & Li, 1977 (= Wanglia Van Valen, 1988)
  - Family Pantolambdidae Cope, 1883
    - Genus Caenolambda Gazin, 1956
    - Genus Nanxiongilambda Quan & Wang, 2024
    - Genus Pantolambda Cope, 1882
  - Family Pantolambdodontidae Granger & Gregory, 1934
    - Genus Archaeolambda Flerov, 1952
    - Genus Celaenolambda Tong and Wang 2006
    - Genus Dilambda Tong, 1978
    - Genus Guichilambda Huang & Chen, 1997
    - Genus Nanlingilambda Tong, 1979
    - Genus Oroklambda Dashzeveg, 1980
    - Genus Pantolambdodon Granger & Gregory, 1934
  - Family Pastoralodontidae Chow & Qi, 1978
    - Genus Altilambda Chow & Wang, 1978
    - Genus Convallisodon Chow & Qi, 1978
    - Genus Pastoralodon Chow & Qi 1978
    - Genus ?Huananius Huang & Zheng, 1999
  - Family Titanoideidae Patterson, 1934
    - Genus Titanoides Gidley, 1917
    - Ichnogenus Thulitheripus Lüthje et al., 2010 (tracks attributed to Titanoides)
  - Family ?Cyriacotheriidae Rose & Krause, 1982
    - Genus ?Cyriacotherium Rose and Krause, 1982
    - Genus ?Presbytherium Scott, 2010
  - Genus ?Crustulus Clemens, 2017
