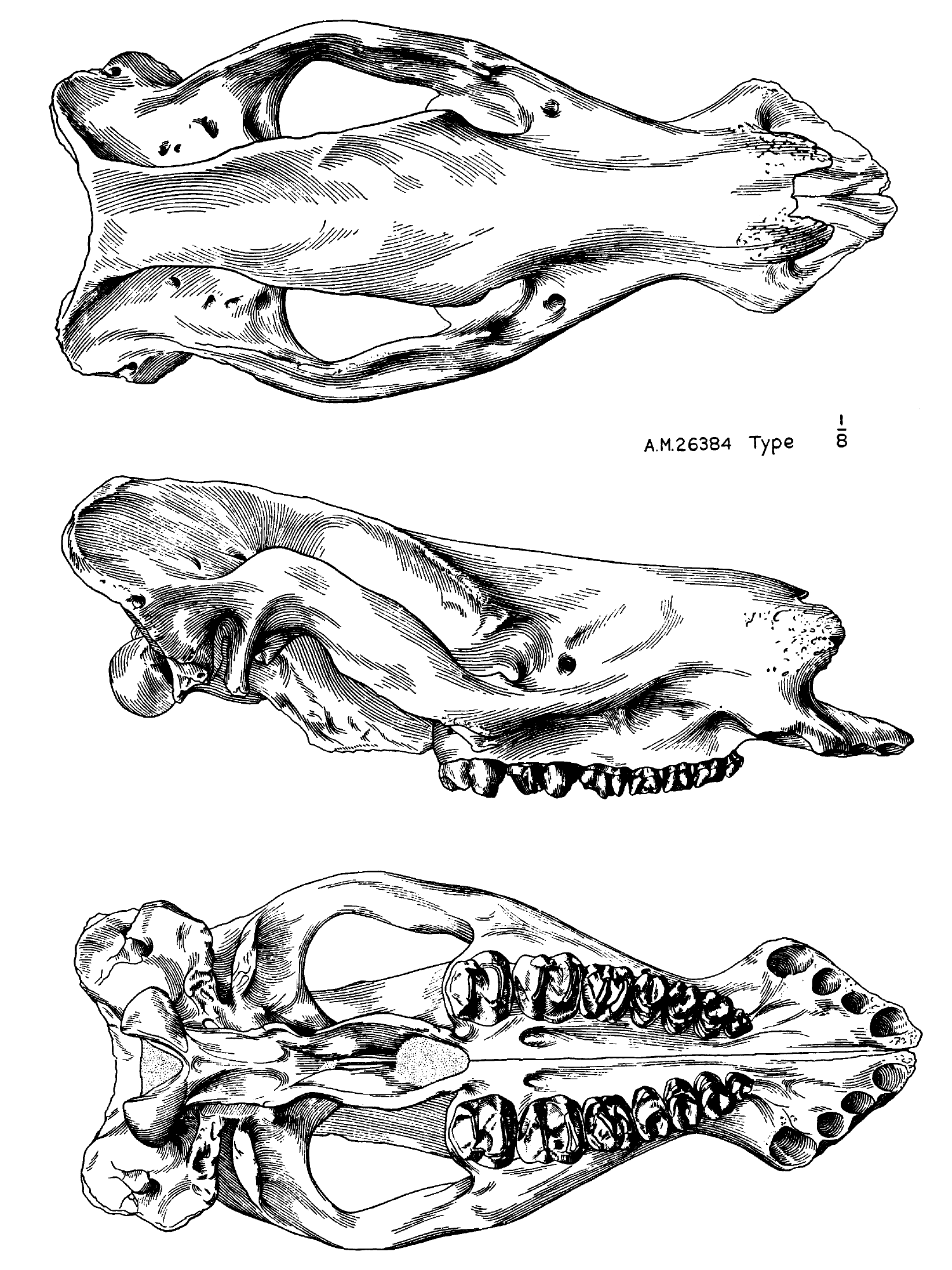
- Skull diagram

Scientific classification
- Kingdom: Animalia
- Phylum: Chordata
- Class: Mammalia
- Order: †Pantodonta
- Family: †Coryphodontidae
- Genus: †Hypercoryphodon; Osborn & Granger, 1932
- Species: †H. thomsoni

Binomial name
- †Hypercoryphodon thomsoni Osborn & Granger, 1932

= Hypercoryphodon =

Hypercoryphodon Temporal range: Late Eocene, 37–34 Ma

Genus of mammals (fossil)

Hypercoryphodon is an extinct genus of rhinoceros-sized pantodont native to Late Eocene Mongolia, and was very similar to its ancestor, Coryphodon. Described from a skull, Hypercoryphodon is a quadrupedal hippopotamus-like herbivore that may have been able to adapt its feeding to suit different situations. It is thought to have possibly lived in wetland to forest ecosystems that it might have shared with other herbivores such as dinoceratans like Gobiatherium. The low-crowned teeth of Hypercoryphodon were adapted for feeding on soft aquatic vegetation.

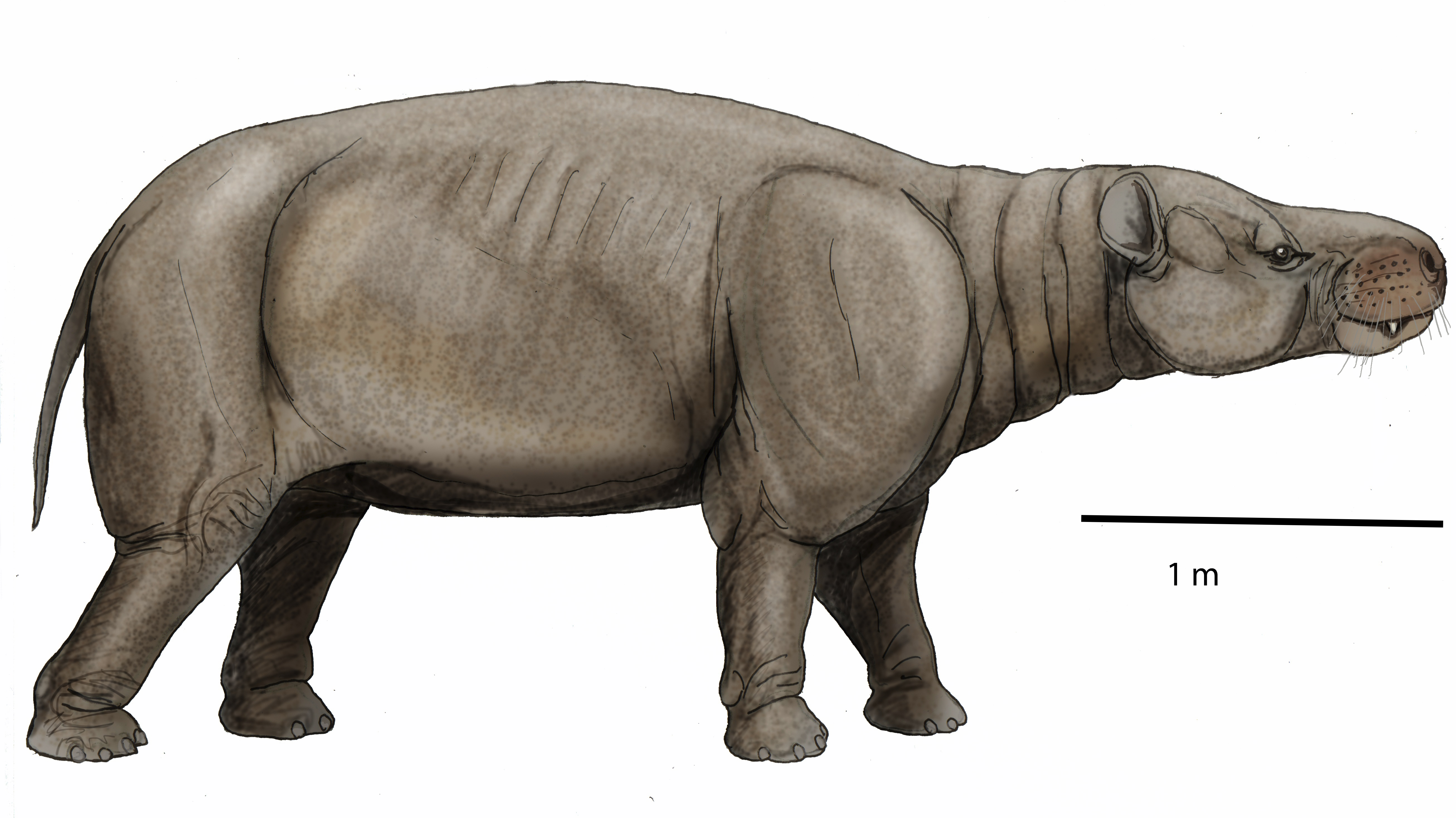
Life restoration
