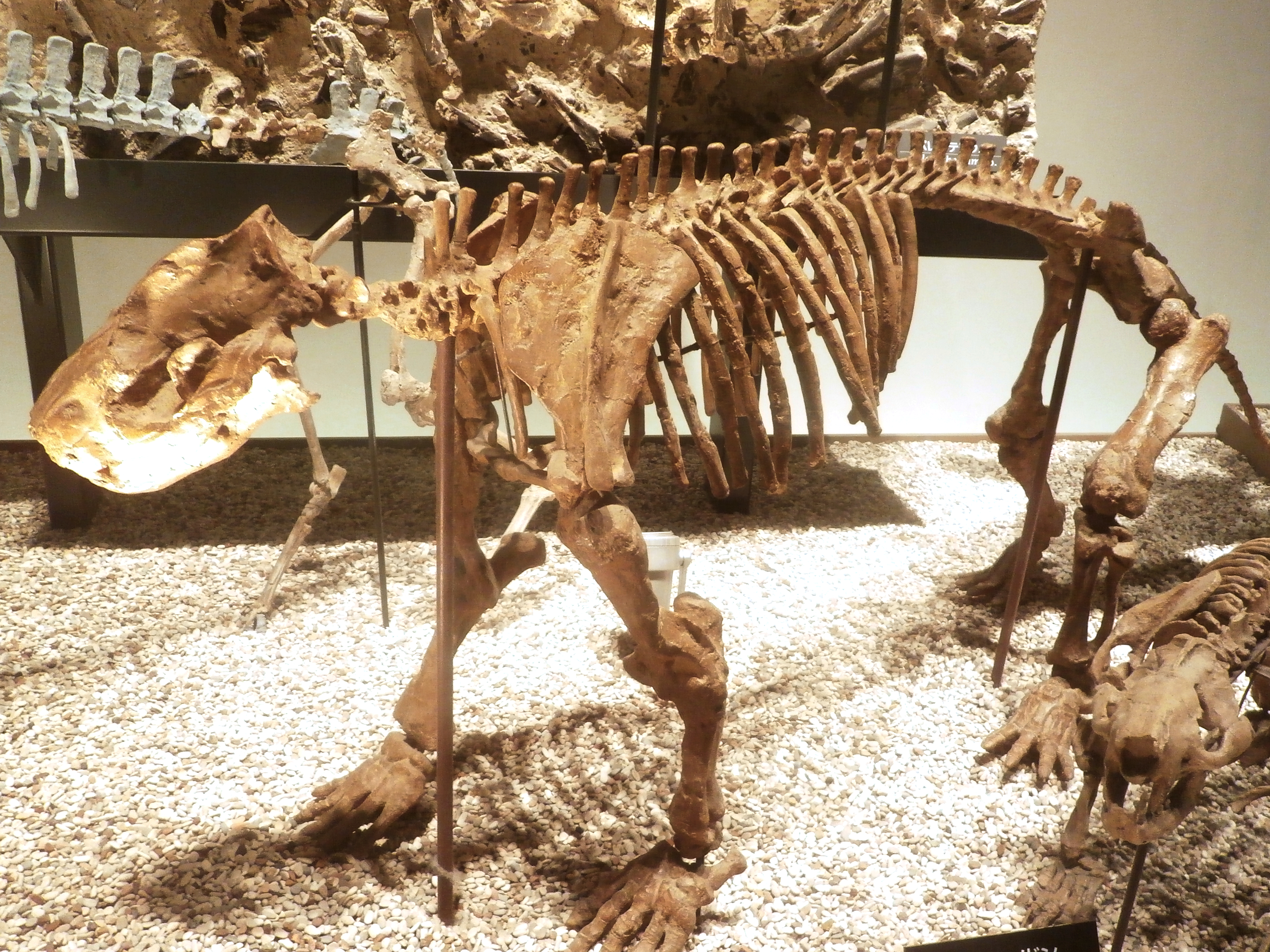
- Skeleton of Bemalambda pachyoesteus, exhibited in the National Museum of Nature and Science, Tokyo, Japan.

Scientific classification
- Kingdom: Animalia
- Phylum: Chordata
- Class: Mammalia
- Infraclass: Placentalia
- Order: †Pantodonta
- Superfamily: †Bemalambdoidea
- Family: †Bemalambdidae; Chow et al. 1973

Genera and species
- †Bemalambda (type) Chow et al. 1973; †B. nanhsiungensis (type) Chow et al. 1973; †B. pachyoesteus Chow et al. 1973; †B. dingae Li 2005; †B. crassa Chow et al. 1973; †Hypsilolambda Wang 1975; †H. chalingensis Wang 1975

= Bemalambdidae =

Bemalambdidae Temporal range: Early Paleocene–Middle Paleocene

Extinct family of mammals

Bemalambdidae is an extinct family of pantodont mammals known from Early and Middle Paleocene of China.

== Description ==
The bemalambdids are, along with Harpyodus and Alcidedorbignya, the most primitive pantodonts. Hypsilolambda is known only from a skull and teeth, but Bemalambda is known from complete cranial and postcranial specimens and is the best preserved mammal from Shanghuan. It was dog-sized (a large animal for its era) and omnivorous.

Both genera have dilambdodont upper premolars (W-shaped crests on the crowns), one of the characteristics of pantodonts, but their upper molars, unlike in later pantodonts, are almost zalambdodont (V-shaped crests) and transversely elongated with the paracone and metacone (cusp) appressed or connated. On p^{3}-M^{3}, there is a large buccal platform on the crowns, the stylar shelf. An exterior indentation on the buccal side, the ectoflexus, is very deep. The lower cheek teeth are easily recognizable as pantodont.

The bemalambdids had a low and short skull with a very small braincase; a prominent sagittal crest and deep temporal fossae, a broad snout; and flaring zygomatic processes. The high coronoid process on the mandible suggest the chewing musculatures was more developed than in later pantodonts. The postcranium was robust, and, judging from a single massive humerus, adapted for digging.

== Fossil localities ==
- the Early Paleocene (65.5 to 58.7 Ma) of Guangdong, China (type) (25.1°N 114.3°E, paleocoordinates 26.0°N 109.4°E)
- the Early Paleocene (65.5 - 58.7 Ma) of Shaanxi, China
- the Middle Paleocene (61.7 - 58.7 Ma) of Jiangxi, China
