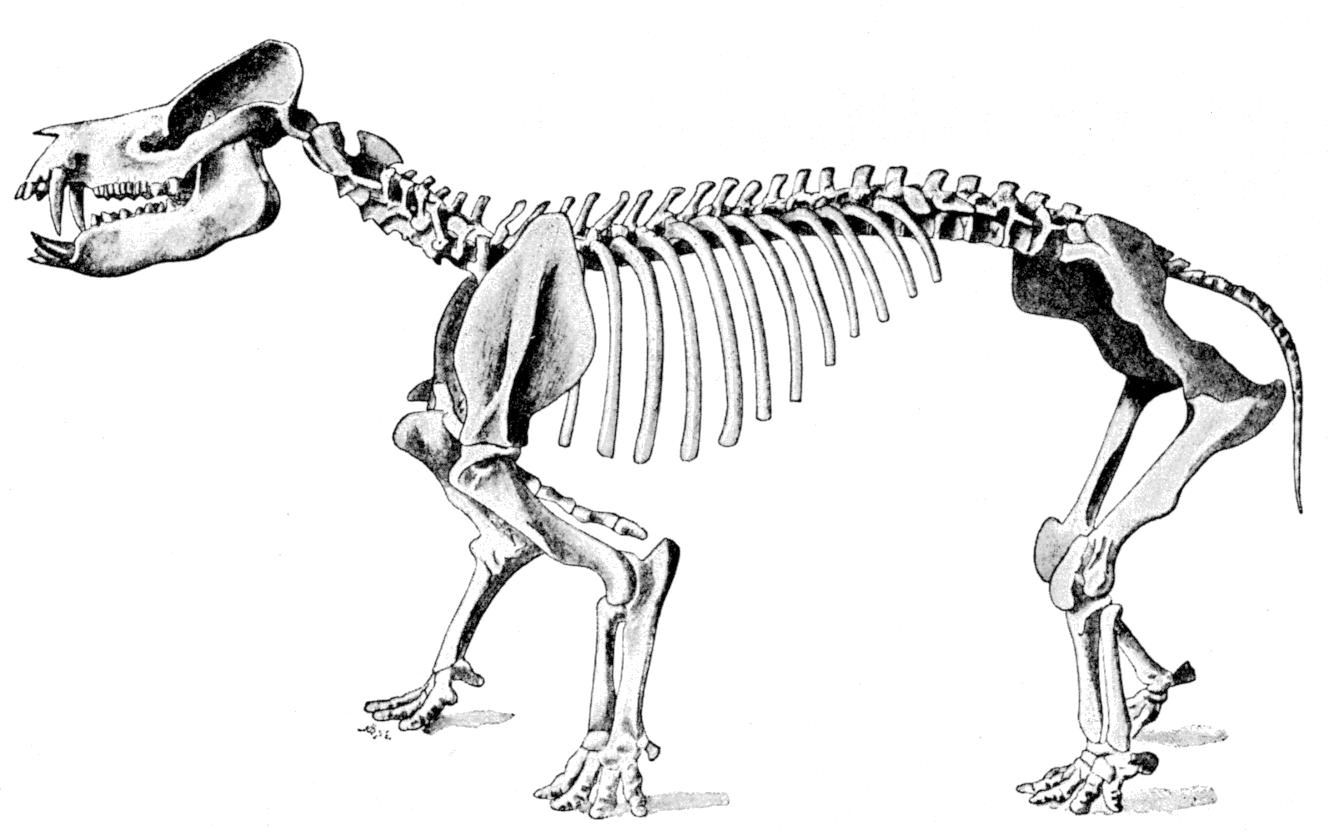
- Coryphodon skeleton

Scientific classification
- Domain: Eukaryota
- Kingdom: Animalia
- Phylum: Chordata
- Class: Mammalia
- Order: †Pantodonta
- Superfamily: †Coryphodontoidea; Simons 1960
- Family: †Coryphodontidae; Marsh 1876

Genera
- †Asiocoryphodon Xu 1976; †Coryphodon (type) Owen 1845; †Eudinoceras Osborn 1924; †Heterocoryphodon Lucas & Tong 1988; †Hypercoryphodon Osborn & Granger 1932; †Metacoryphodon Chow & Qi 1982; †Procoryphodon Flerow 1957

Synonyms
- Bathmodontidae

= Coryphodontidae =

Coryphodontidae Temporal range: Late Paleocene–Middle Eocene

Extinct family of mammals

Coryphodontidae is an extinct family of pantodont mammals known from the Late Paleocene to the Middle Eocene of Eurasia and North America.

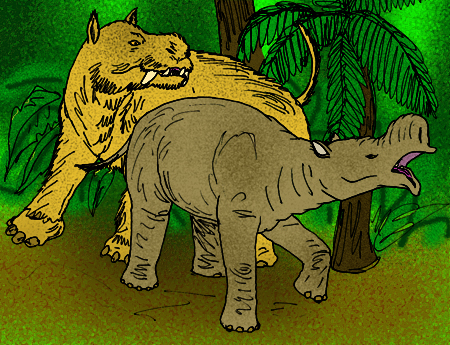
The Late Eocene dinoceratan Gobiatherium major, and the pantodont Hypercoryphodon, of what is now Mongolia.

The type genus Coryphodon is known from around the Paleocene-Eocene transition in Europe, western United States, northern Canada, and eastern Asia. The remaining genera are known exclusively from the middle Eocene of Asia.

The coryphodontids are related to the pantolambdids. Coryphodon are large, derived pantodonts first described in the mid-19th century, but no intermediate stages leading to their unusual upper molars are known. The last known species of Coryphodon have bilophodont molars similar to later, more derived coryphodontids, and, most likely, Coryphodon is the primitive sister taxon to the remaining genera and the entire lineage (or lineages) originated from within this genus. Two coryphodontids considerably larger than Coryphodon but endemic to China, Asiocoryphodon and Heterocoryphodon, have more advanced bilophodont dentition. Metacoryphodon is morphologically transitional between Coryphodon and Eudinoceras.

== Paleobiology ==
Corypohodontids were slow-growing and long-living animals, and studies of a large sample of individuals from a single locality, assumed to be from the same population, suggest that coryphodontids had a polygynous social structure in which males and females reached sexual maturity at different ages. Histological study of molar enamel samples of Heterocoryphodon flerowi and Eudinoceras mongoliensis show that their life histories were comparable to those of Hippopotamus amphibius and Ceratotherium simum, respectively. Asiocoryphodon conicus lived shorter and grew faster than hippopotamus.
