= Haplolambda =

Haplolambda Temporal range: Paleocene

Scientific classification
- Kingdom: Animalia
- Phylum: Chordata
- Class: Mammalia
- Order: †Pantodonta
- Family: †Barylambdidae
- Genus: †Haplolambda; Patterson, 1939

Type species
- Haplolambda quinni Patterson, 1939

Species
- H. quinni; H. simpsoni

Extinct genus of mammals

Haplolambda is an extinct genus of pantodont mammals in the family Barylambdidae from the Paleocene of North America, containing two species: H. quinni known from Colorado and H. simpsoni from Utah.
