= Presbytherium =

Presbytherium Temporal range: Paleocene

Scientific classification
- Domain: Eukaryota
- Kingdom: Animalia
- Phylum: Chordata
- Class: Mammalia
- Order: †Pantodonta
- Family: †Cyriacotheriidae
- Genus: †Presbytherium; C. S. Scott, 2010

Extinct genus of mammals

Presbytherium is an extinct pantodont which existed in what is now Alberta, Canada, during the Paleocene period. It was first named by Craig S. Scott in 2010.
