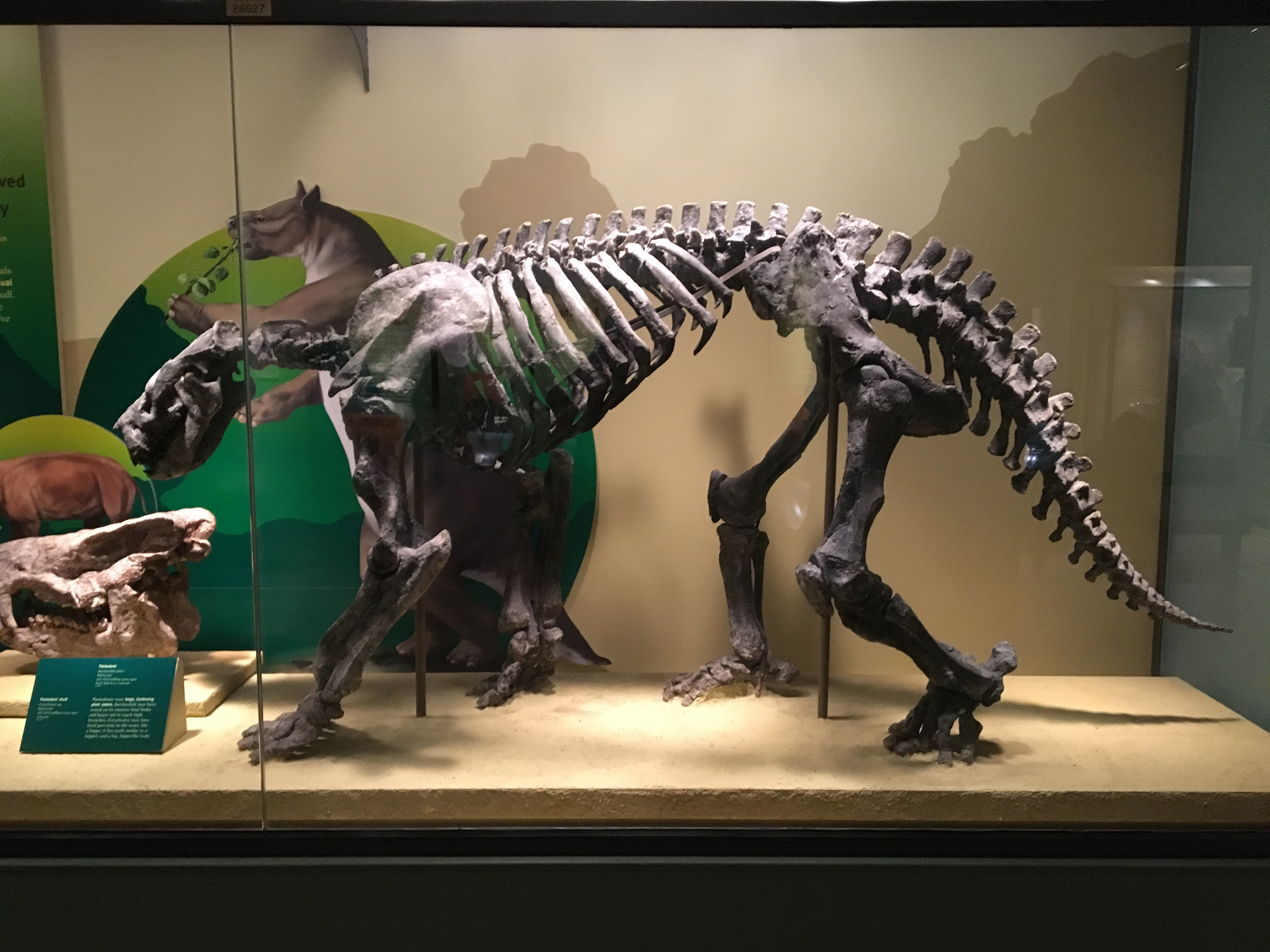
- B. faberi skeleton, Field Museum

Scientific classification
- Kingdom: Animalia
- Phylum: Chordata
- Class: Mammalia
- Order: †Pantodonta
- Family: †Barylambdidae
- Genus: †Barylambda; Patterson 1937

Species
- B. churchilli Gingerich & Childress 1983; B. faberi Patterson 1933; B. jackwilsoni Schiebout 1974

= Barylambda =

Barylambda Temporal range: Mid Paleocene-Early Eocene (Tiffanian-Wasatchian) ~60–50 Ma

Pantodont mammal genus from the Paleocene epoch

Barylambda (Greek: "heavy" (baros), "lambda" (lambda) in a reference to larger size than that of Pantolambda) is an extinct genus of pantodont mammal from the middle to late Paleocene, well known from several finds in the Wasatchian (NALMA classification) DeBeque Formation of Colorado and the Clarkforkian Wasatch Formation to Tiffanian Fort Union Formation in Wyoming. Three species of Barylambda are currently recognized. The creature likely lived a life similar to that of a modern tapir, browsing on foliage and soft vegetation. Barylambda seems to have been quite successful for an early pantodont, though eventually it seems to have been replaced in its ecosystem by other pantodonts, such as Coryphodon.

== Description ==
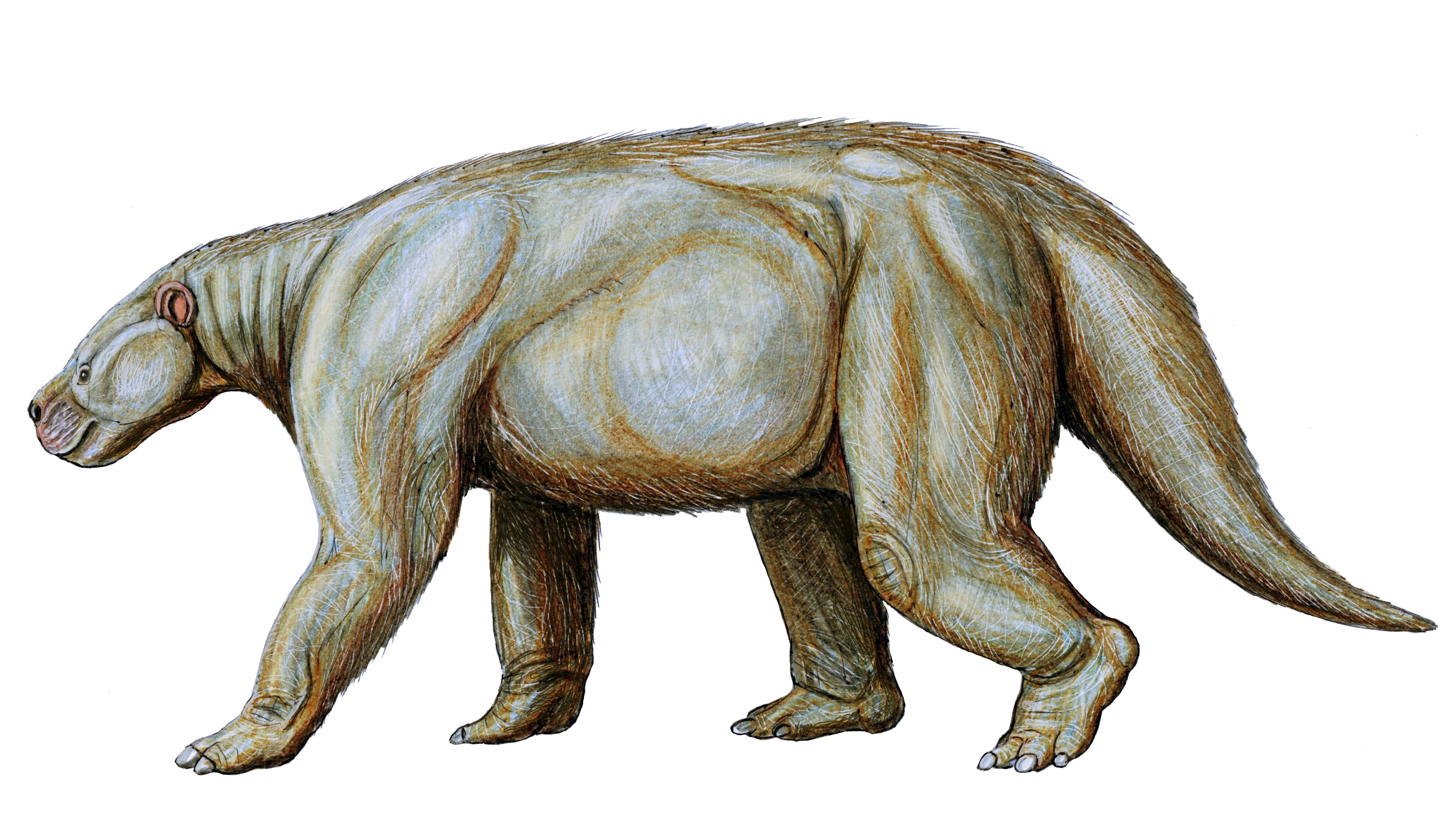
Restoration of B. faberi

In life, Barylambda probably resembled a large ground sloth, with a small head and long, well-developed tail and bear-like legs. It was a large animal weighing around 650 kg (1,430 lb), about the size of a pony. Barylambda was large even for a pantodont, sheer size probably protecting it from contemporary carnivores.

Like other pantodonts, Barylambda was a heavyset, five-toed plantigrade animal. The vertebrae of the tail were unusually massive; the living animal may have been able to rear up and support itself on the hind legs and tail in order to reach higher for food. The generalized appearance of the teeth, the presence of well-developed canines only in males, the grinding wear and lack of shearing blades on the molars, and the animal's heavy build strongly suggest that it was herbivorous.
