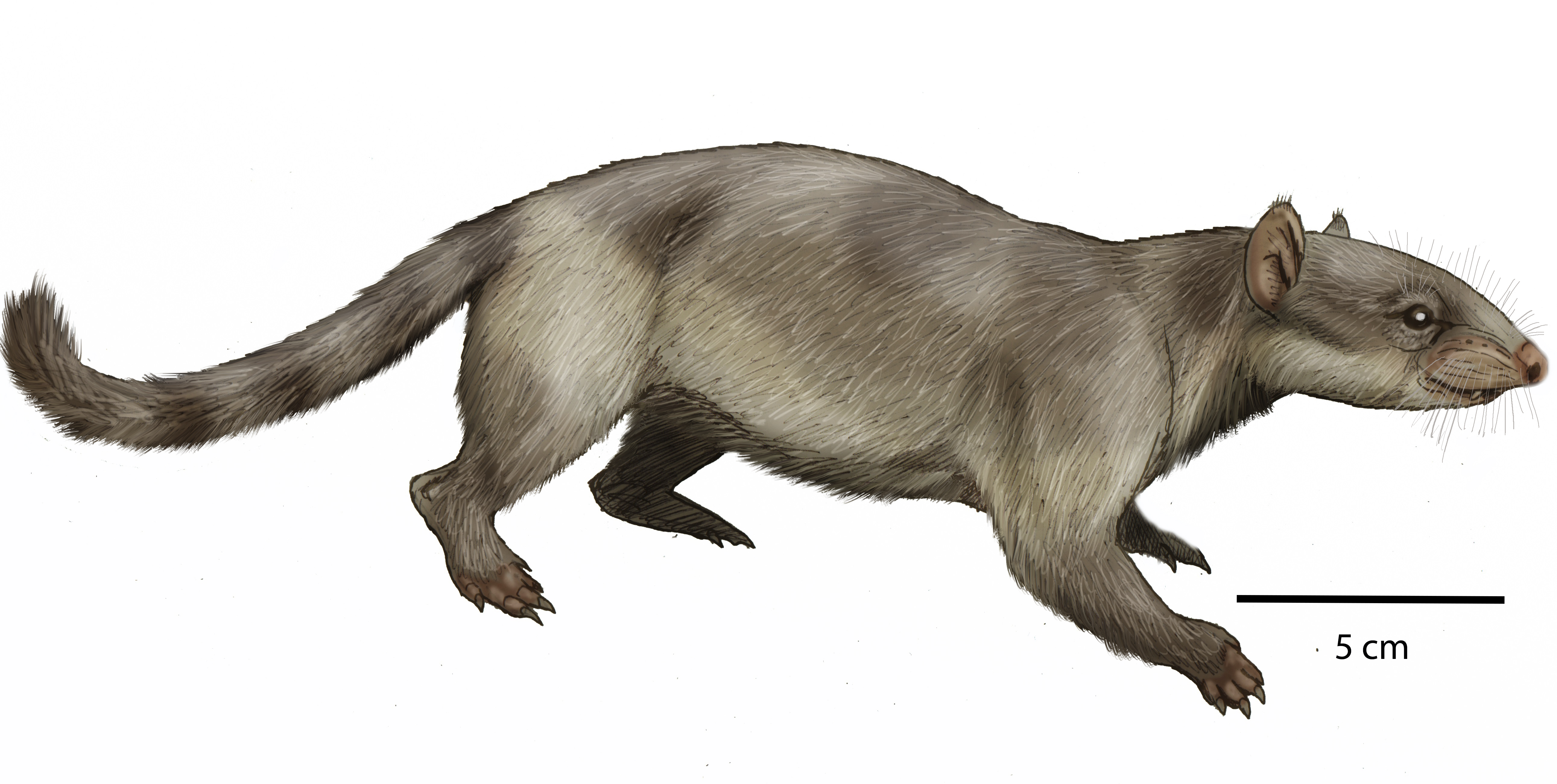
- Life restoration

Scientific classification
- Kingdom: Animalia
- Phylum: Chordata
- Class: Mammalia
- Order: †Pantodonta
- Genus: †Alcidedorbignya de Muizon and Marshall, 1987
- Species: †A. inopinata

Binomial name
- †Alcidedorbignya inopinata de Muizon and Marshall, 1987

= Alcidedorbignya =

Alcidedorbignya Temporal range: Paleocene (early Torrejonian), ~65–64.866 Ma

Extinct genus of mammals

Alcidedorbignya is an extinct pantodont mammal known from the Early Paleocene (Tiupampan SALMA, 65.5 to 61.7 million years ago) Santa Lucia Formation (18.0°S 65.6°W, paleocoordinates 20.7°S 52.5°W) at Tiupampa near Mizque, Cochabamba, Bolivia.

Following a naming convention established by pioneering Argentine palaeontologist Florentino Ameghino (i.e. combining the first name and surname of a prominent scientist), the genus name honours French naturalist Alcide d'Orbigny.

== Description ==
Estimated 25 cm head-body length and 500 grams, this was a small squirrel sized animal, terrestrial with possible scansorial habits, and either herbivorous or omnivorous.

Alcidedorbignya is one of the oldest and most primitive of the pantodonts and the only pantodont genus known from South America. Not only have some scientists questioned the age of the type locality, instead advocating an Asian origin for the pantodonts, Alcidedorbignya's bare existence obscures the origins of the already enigmatic pantodonts. Taxonomic similarities indicate that there was a mammalian interchange between North and South America during the early Paleocene, and the North American pantodont Pantolambda is a potential descendant of Alcidedorbignya.

Alciddedorbignya is known from several specimens of upper and lower dentitions, including juveniles. P^{3–4} have V-shaped ectolophs (ridges on the crowns), indicating it was a primitive pantodont. Other molar characteristics makes it unique among pantodonts. On the molars, the paracone and metacone are separated and not connate as in Bemalambda and Harpyodus. As in these two genera, there is neither a mesostyle on M^{1–2} nor a strongly V-shaped centocrista as in eupantodonts (all later pantodonts). It is still unclear which the primitive condition is in pantodont upper dentition, and the position of Alcidedorbignya near the base of the clade remain unresolved.
