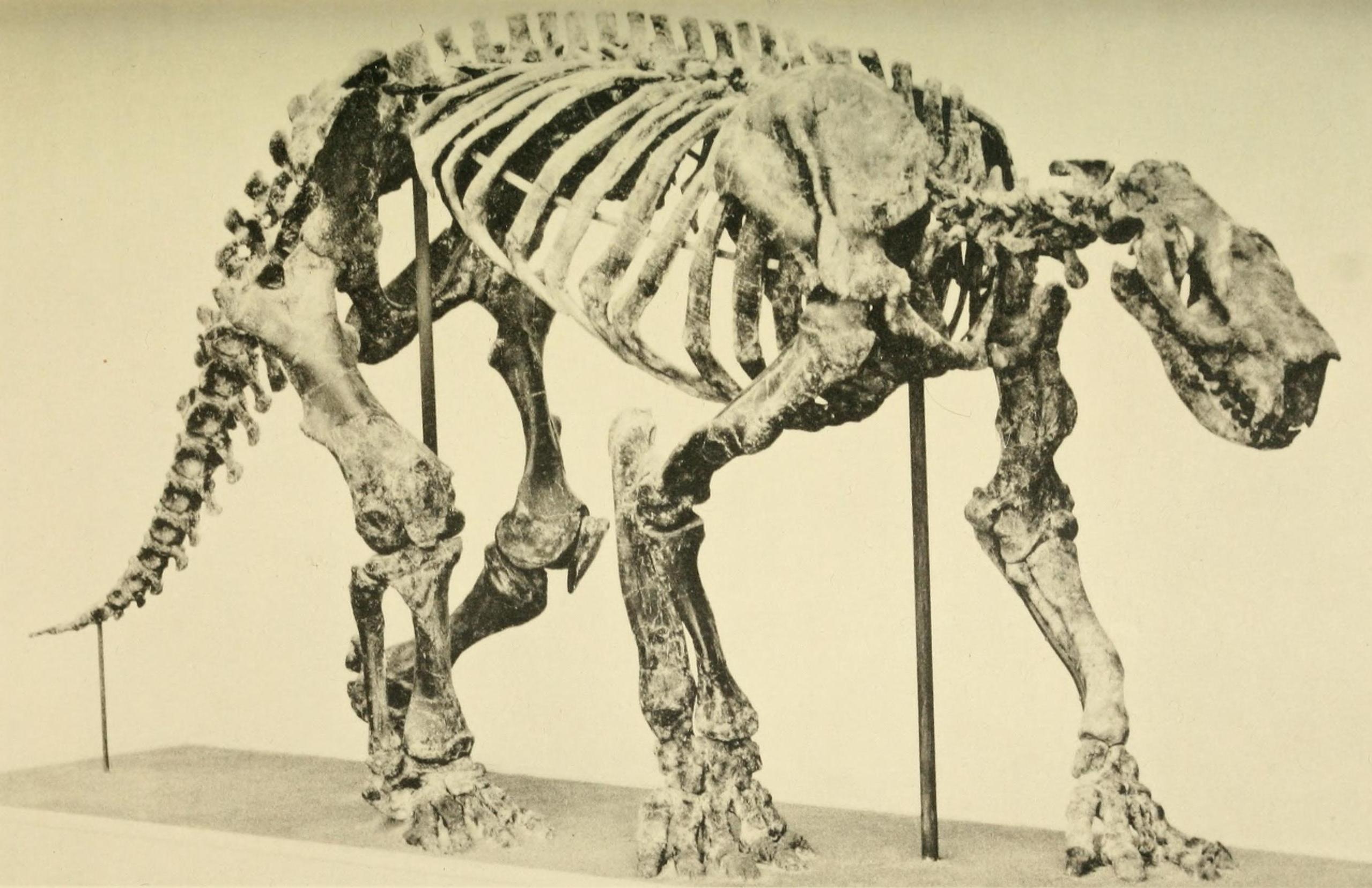
- Barylambda faberi
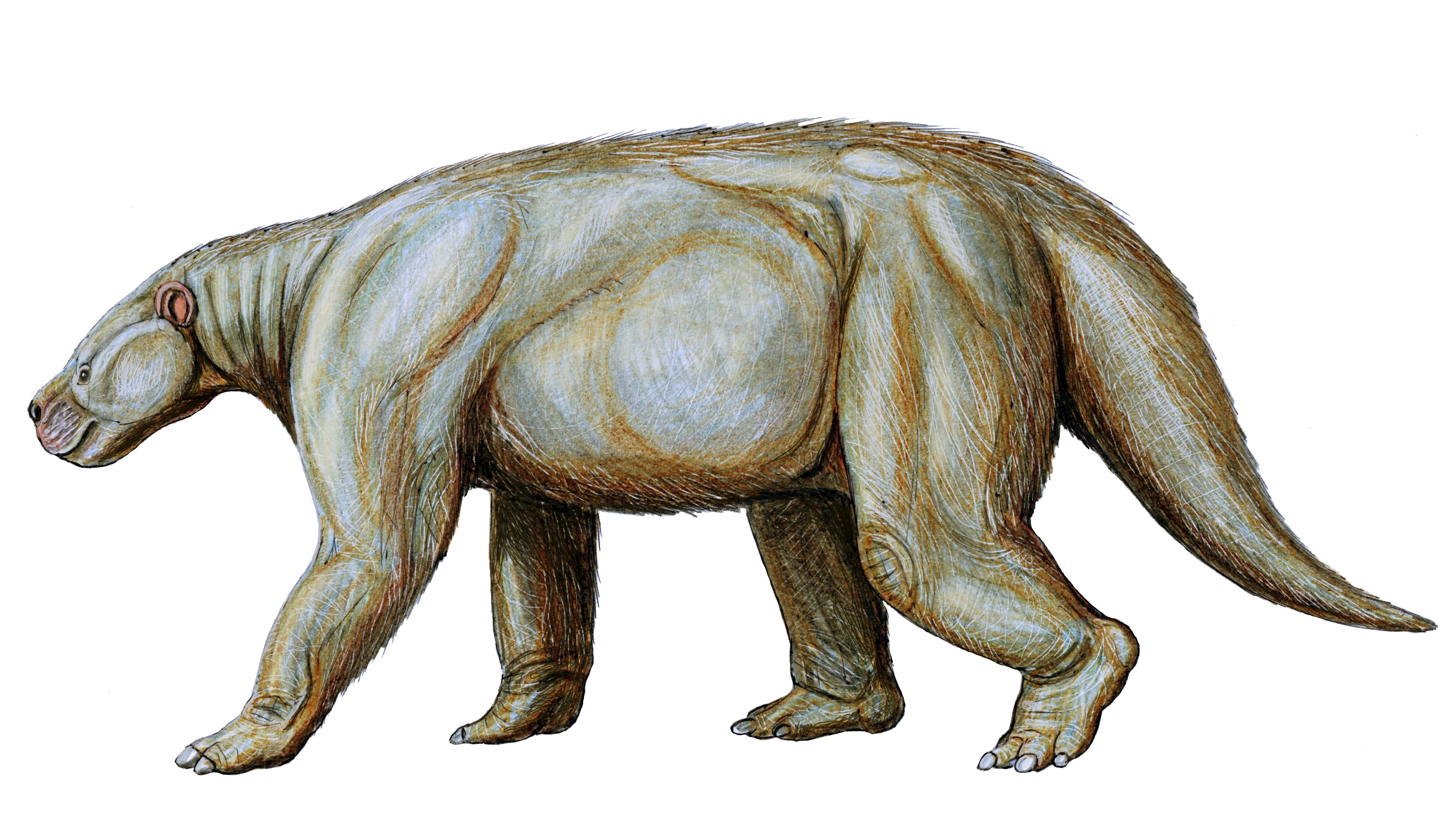
- Life restoration of Barylambda faberi

Scientific classification
- Kingdom: Animalia
- Phylum: Chordata
- Class: Mammalia
- Order: †Pantodonta
- Superfamily: †Pantolambdoidea
- Family: †Barylambdidae; Patterson, 1939

Genera
- †Barylambda; †Haplolambda; †Ignatiolambda; †Leptolambda

= Barylambdidae =

Barylambdidae Temporal range: Paleocene-Early Eocene 66–50 Ma

Extinct family of mammals

Barylambdidae is an extinct family of pantodont mammals from North America.
