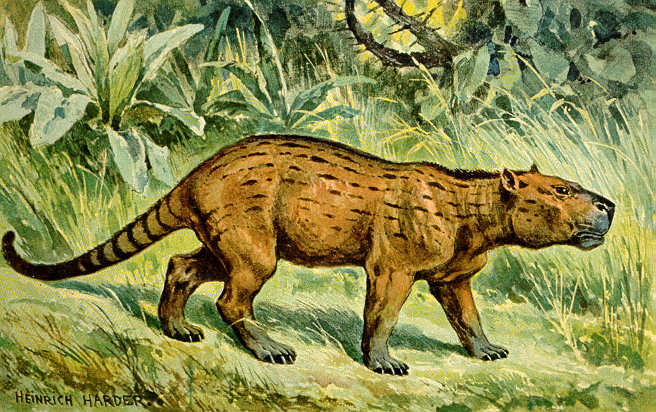

Scientific classification
- Kingdom: Animalia
- Phylum: Chordata
- Class: Mammalia
- Order: †Pantodonta
- Superfamily: †Pantolambdoidea
- Family: †Pantolambdidae
- Genus: †Pantolambda; Cope, 1882

Type species
- †Pantolambda bathmodon Cope, 1882

Species
- P. bathmodon Cope, 1882; P. cavirictum Cope, 1883; P. intermedium Simpson, 1935

= Pantolambda =

Pantolambda Temporal range: Paleocene, 63–57 Ma

Genus of mammals (fossil)

Pantolambda (Greek: "all" (pantos), "lambda" (lambda), in a reference to the shape of upper premolars, similar to the Greek letter lambda) is an extinct genus of Paleocene pantodont mammal. Pantolambda lived during the middle Paleocene, and has been found both in Asia and North America.

Cretaceous mammals, which had to compete with dinosaurs, were generally small insect eaters. Pantolambda was one of the first mammals to expand into the large-animal niches left vacant by the extinction of the dinosaurs. Pantolambda and other early pantodonts would quickly evolve into heavy animals such as Barylambda and Coryphodon. These were the first large browsers, pioneering styles of life later followed by many unrelated groups of mammals: rhinos, tapirs, hippos, ground sloths, and elephants. Pantodonts such as Pantolambda were definitely not tree dwellers.

== Description ==
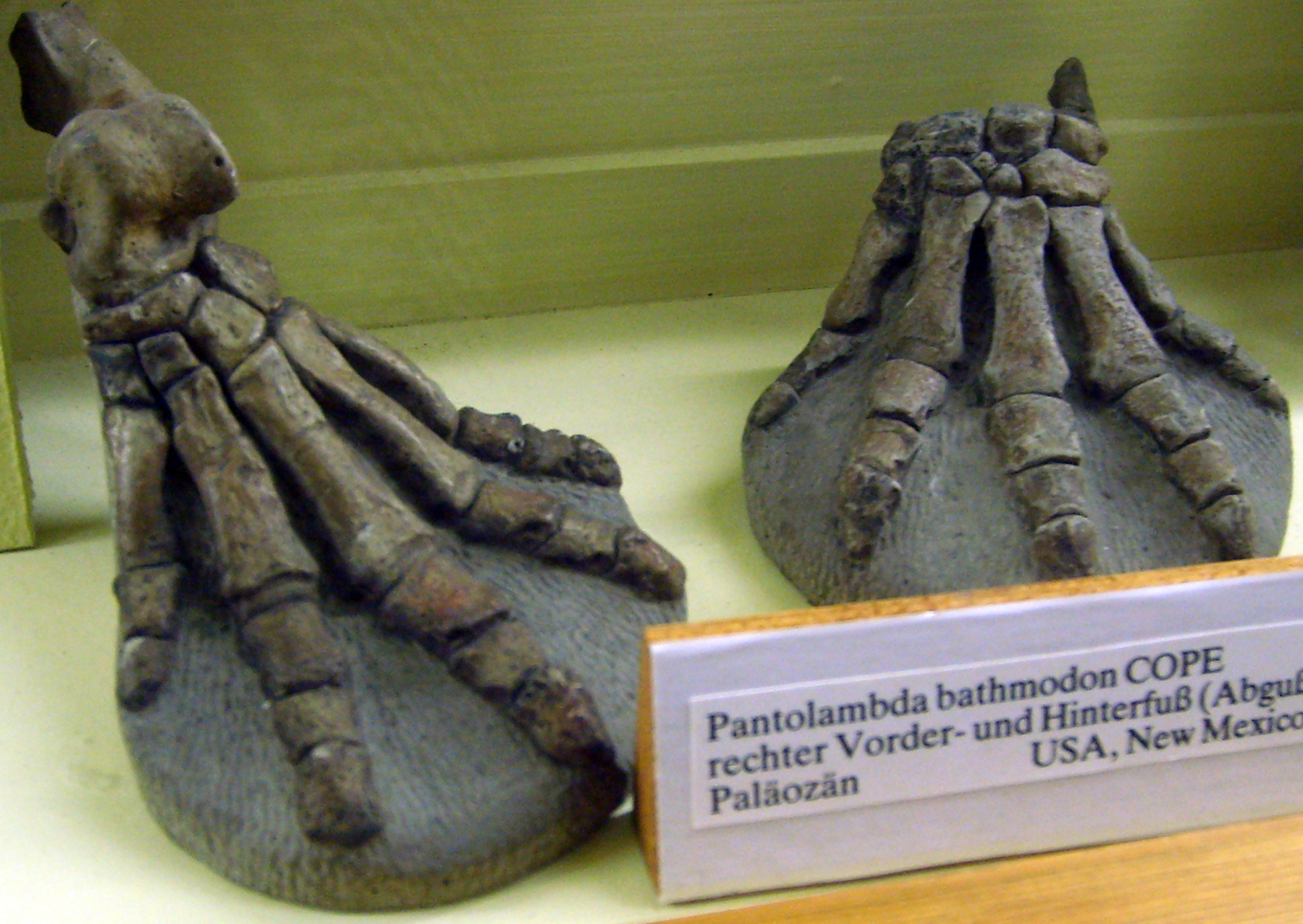
P. bathmodon fore and hind foot casts at the Museum für Naturkunde, Berlin

Pantolambda was large for a Paleocene mammal, the species P. bathmodon reached 28 kg in body mass, while P. cavirictum was as massive as 178.9 kg. A generalized early mammal, it had a vaguely cat-like body, heavy head, long tail and five-toed plantigrade feet ending in blunt nails that were neither hooves nor sharp claws. The foot bones articulated in a similar way to the feet of hoofed mammals, and the feet were probably not very flexible. The skull of Pantolambda was long, and it bore a prominent saggital crest. The limb bones were robust, and the humerus has a large deltoid crest whilst the femur had the third trochanter.

=== Teeth ===
The teeth had a selenodont structure; enamel ridges with crescent-shaped cusps. Selenodont teeth are found in modern grazers and browsers such as cattle and deer, but Pantolambda's teeth were low-crowned and indicate a not very specialized diet. The canines of Pantolambda were similar in form to those of Coryphodon, though much smaller in size. Pantolambda probably ate a mix of shoots, leaves, fungi, and fruit, which it may have supplemented with occasional worms or eggs.

== Discovery and species ==
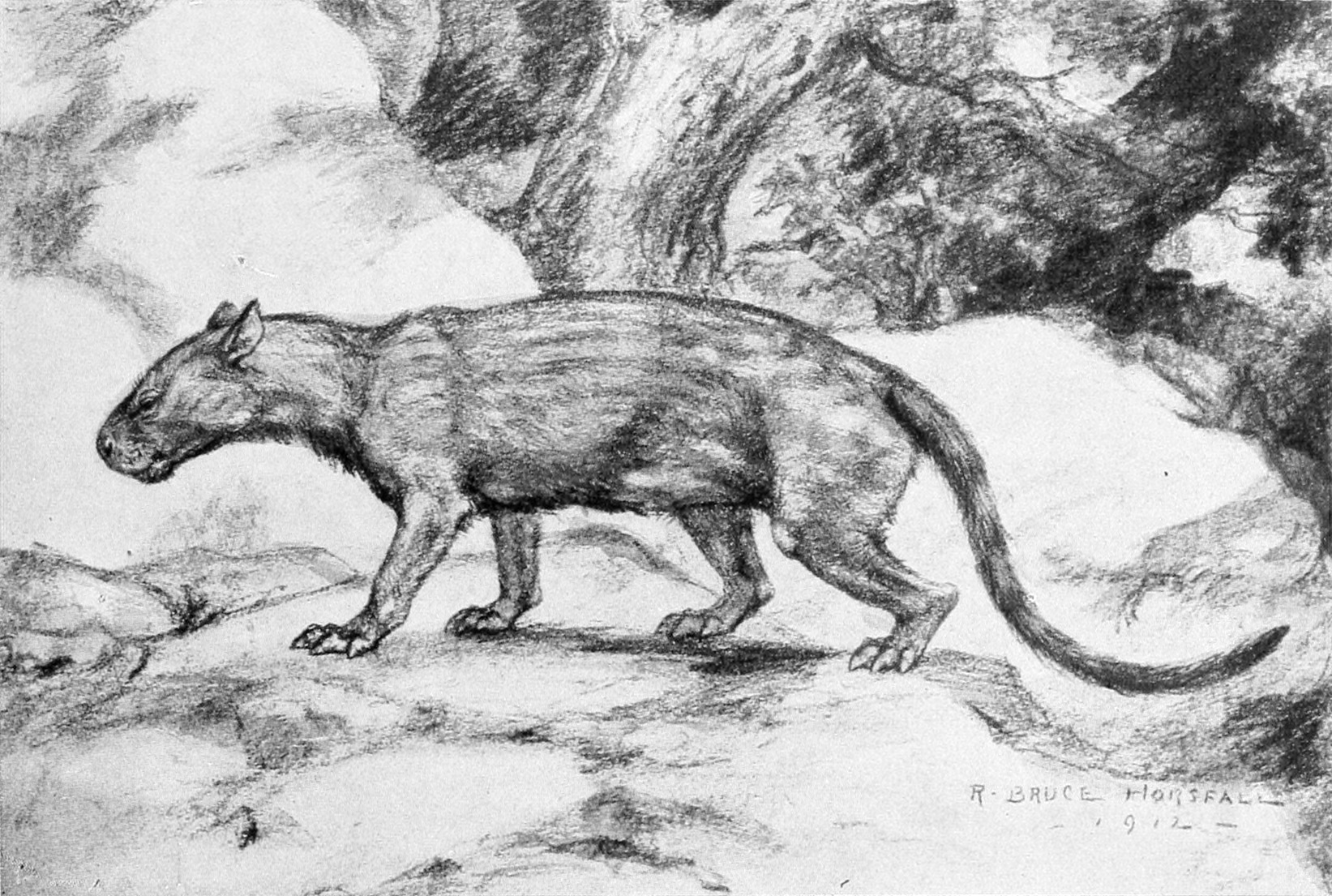
P. bathmodon by Robert Bruce Horsfall.

Fossils of this genus have been found in these Torrejonian-Tiffanian formations at the following localities of the United States:

- Pantolambda bathmodon — nicknamed "ManBearPig" (a reference to a creature from South Park) by some researchers, because it had "five-fingered hands, a bearlike face and the stocky build of a pig"
  - Sandoval County, New Mexico (35.7°N 107.0°W, paleocoordinates 42.1°N 87.1°W)
- Pantolambda cavirictum
  - Park County, Wyoming
  - San Juan County, New Mexico
  - Sandoval County, New Mexico
  - Carbon County, Wyoming
  - Fremont County, Wyoming
- Pantolambda intermedium
  - Hot Springs/Washakie County, Wyoming
  - San Juan County, New Mexico
  - Sweet Grass County, Montana

== Palaeobiology ==
=== Life history ===
P. bathmodon had a long gestation period of about 7 months, but a very rapid interval of suckling lasting only about 30 to 75 days.
