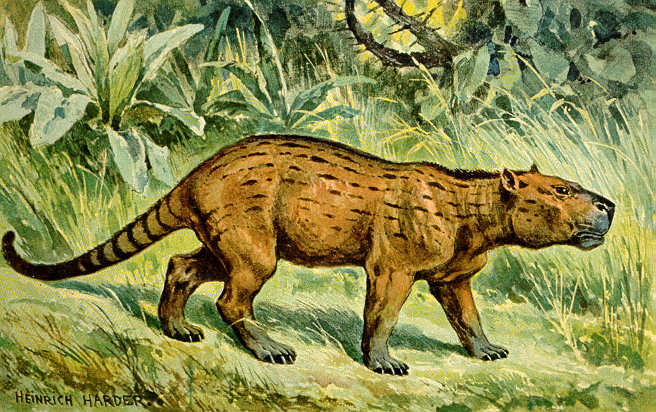
- Image of Pantolambda

Scientific classification
- Kingdom: Animalia
- Phylum: Chordata
- Class: Mammalia
- Order: †Pantodonta
- Superfamily: †Pantolambdoidea
- Family: †Pantolambdidae; Cope, 1883

= Pantolambdidae =

Family of mammals

Pantolambdidae is an extinct family of pantodont mammal in the order Pantodonta.
