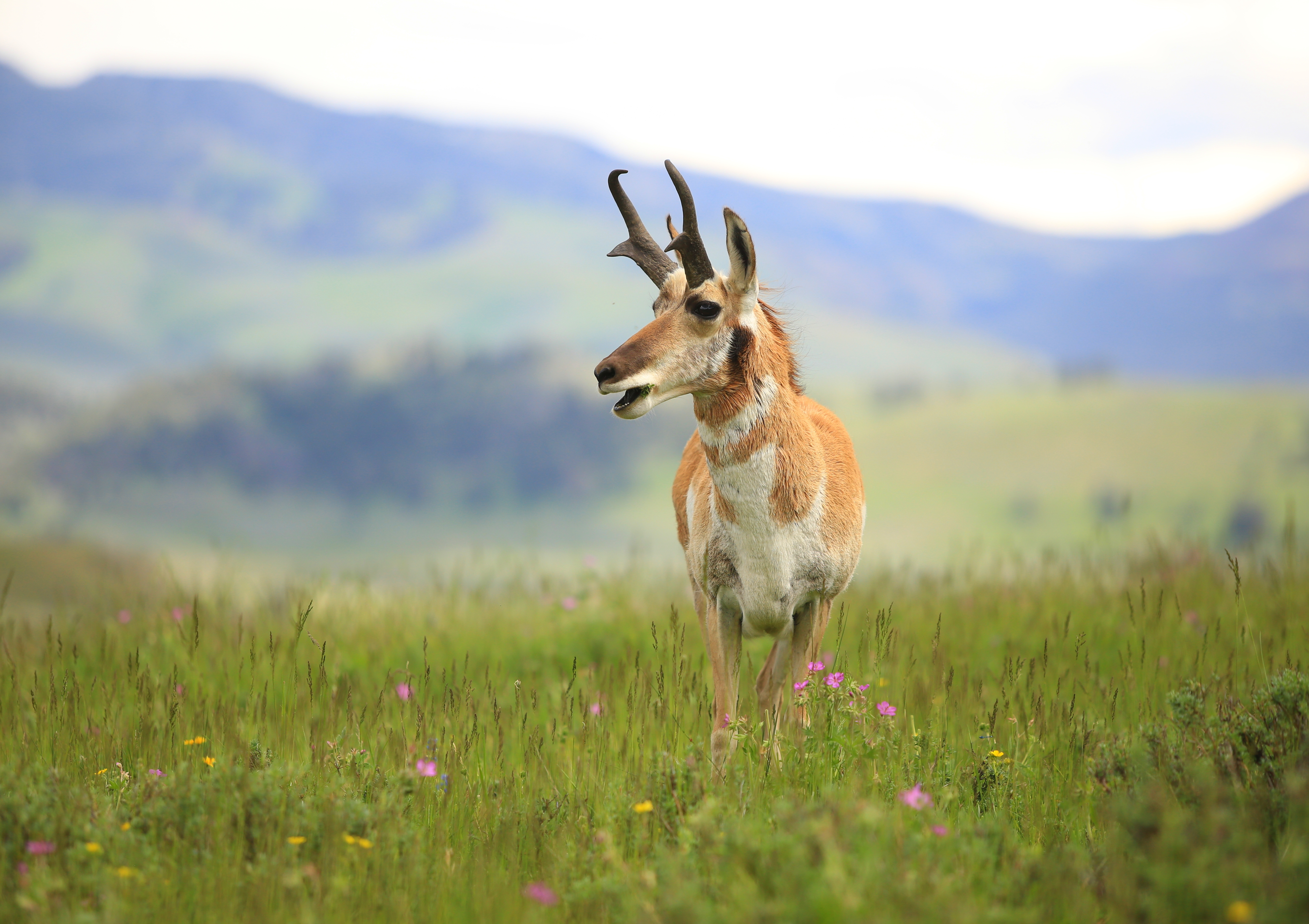
- Pronghorn (Antilocapra americana)

Scientific classification
- Domain: Eukaryota
- Kingdom: Animalia
- Phylum: Chordata
- Class: Mammalia
- Order: Artiodactyla
- Family: Antilocapridae
- Tribe: Antilocaprini
- Genus: Antilocapra; Ord, 1818

Type species
- Antilope americana Ord, 1815

Species
- Antilocapra americana †Antilocapra pacifica

= Antilocapra =

Antilocapra Temporal range: 2.5–0 Ma Early Pleistocene – Recent

Genus of mammals

Antilocapra is a genus of the family Antilocapridae, which contains only a single living species, the pronghorn (Antilocapra americana). Another species, the Pacific pronghorn, lived in California during the Late Pleistocene and survived as recently as 12,000 BP. The name means "antelope-goat".

Antilocapra is the only surviving genus of pronghorn, though three other genera (Capromeryx, Stockoceros and Tetrameryx) existed in North America up until the end of the Pleistocene.
