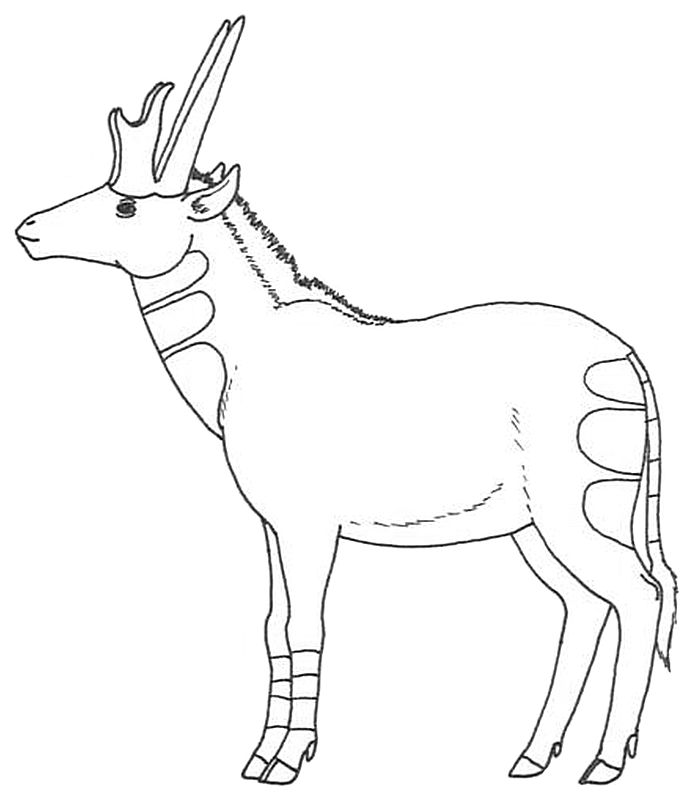

Scientific classification
- Kingdom: Animalia
- Phylum: Chordata
- Class: Mammalia
- Order: Artiodactyla
- Family: Antilocapridae
- Genus: †Hayoceros; Skinner, 1942

Species
- †H. barbouri; †H. falkenbachi

= Hayoceros =

Hayoceros Temporal range: Middle-Late Pleistocene

Extinct genus of mammals

Hayoceros is an extinct genus of the artiodactyl family Antilocapridae, endemic to North America during the Pleistocene epoch (1.8 mya—300,000 years ago), existing for about 1.5 million years.

== Taxonomy ==
Hayoceros was named by Skinner (1942) and named as a subgenus of Tetrameryx by Frick 1937; it was later raised to genus level. It was assigned to the Antilocapridae by Skinner (1942) and Carroll (1988).

== Morphology ==
It was about 1.8 m (5.9 ft) in body length, and in most respects, resembled modern pronghorns. However, in addition to the pair of forked horns located above the eyes, as in modern pronghorns, it also possessed a second, longer and unforked, pair on the back of the skull. Most likely, males used these to fight in a fashion similar to modern pronghorns, locking horns and then pushing until the opponent gives in.
