= Paracosoryx =

Paracosoryx Temporal range: Miocene

Scientific classification
- Domain: Eukaryota
- Kingdom: Animalia
- Phylum: Chordata
- Class: Mammalia
- Order: Artiodactyla
- Family: Antilocapridae
- Subfamily: †Merycodontinae
- Genus: †Paracosoryx; Frick, 1937

Type species
- †Paracosoryx wilsoni Frick, 1937

Species
- P. alticornis; P. burgensis; P. dawesensis; P. furlongi; P. loxoceros; P. nevadensis; P. wilsoni

Extinct genus of mammals

Paracosoryx is an extinct genus of antilocaprids that lived in North America during the Miocene.

== Taxonomy ==
It was originally described as a subgenus of Cosoryx, but was elevated to full genus status. It has been suggest that Paracosoryx is paraphyletic, with some species more related to members of other genera than each other.

== Description ==
The burr of Paracoryx is located relatively high on the shaft compared to other members of Merycodontinae. The horn shaft is relatively long, with small, curved tines.
