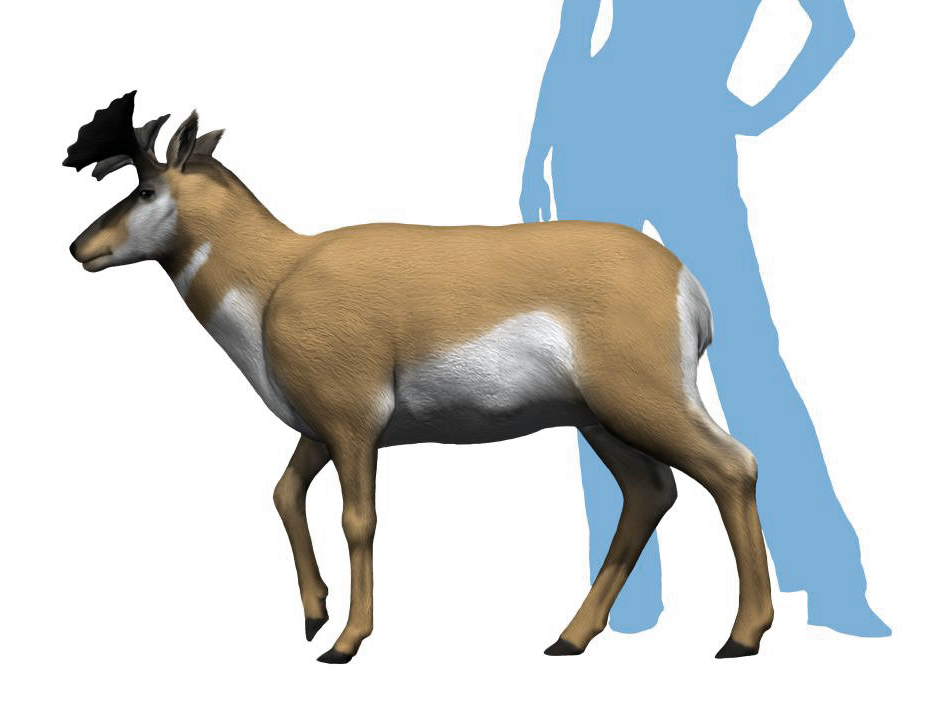

Scientific classification
- Kingdom: Animalia
- Phylum: Chordata
- Class: Mammalia
- Order: Artiodactyla
- Family: Antilocapridae
- Subfamily: †Merycodontinae
- Genus: †Merriamoceros; Frick, 1937
- Species: †M. coronatus

Binomial name
- †Merriamoceros coronatus Merriam, 1913

= Merriamoceros =

Merriamoceros Temporal range: Early Miocene, 17.5–14.8 Ma

Extinct genus of mammals

Merriamoceros is an extinct genus of pronghorn. It is known from a single species, which is also the type species, M. coronatus.

== Discovery and naming ==
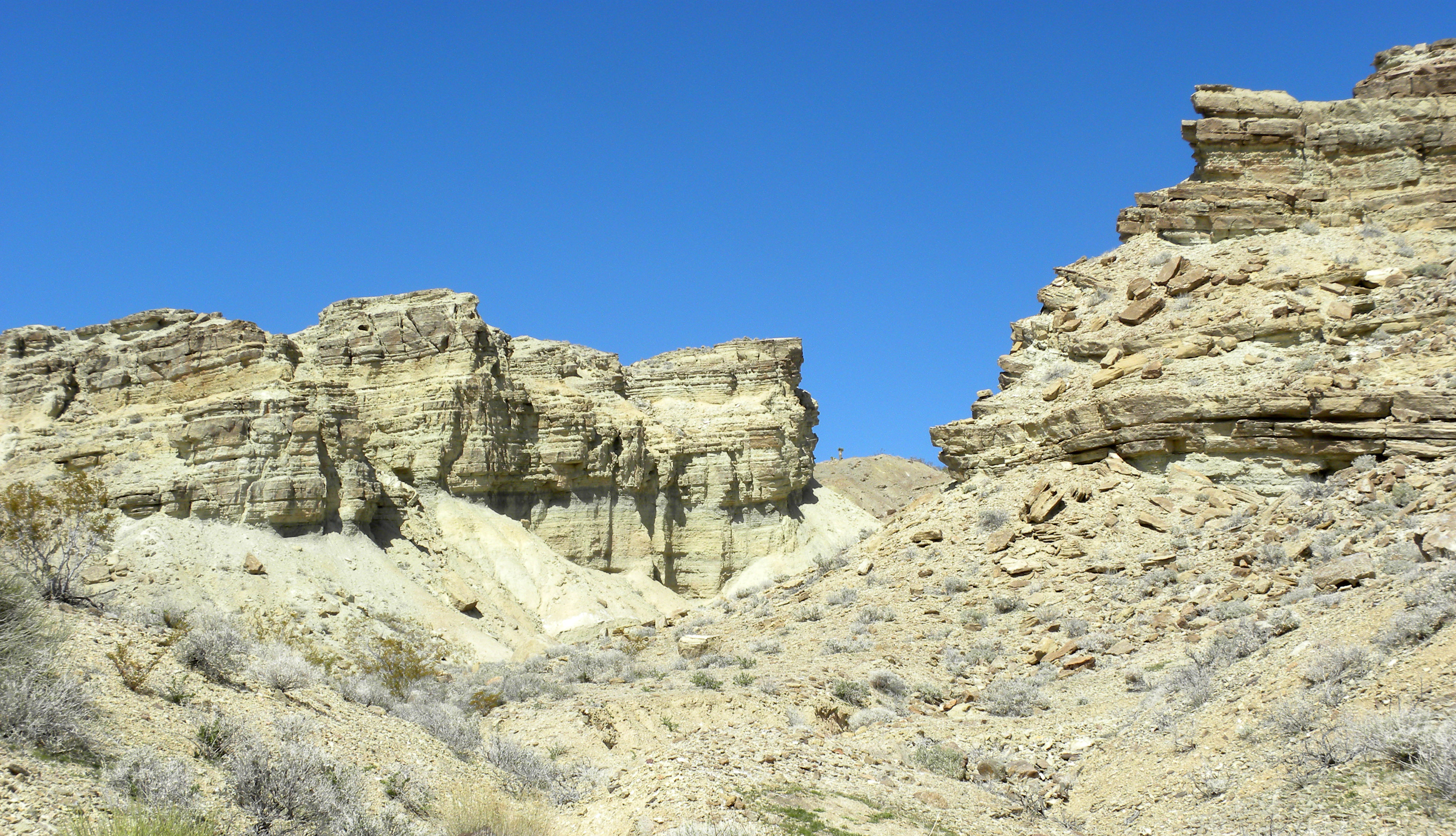
The Barstow Formation in which Merriamoceros was discovered

The type specimen (UCMP 20052) that defines this species is named Merriamoceros coronatus taking after its discoverer, J.M. Merriam. It is known from a partial skull (a single fragmentary horn or antler). Remains of Merriamoceros were found in rock formations dating to the Early Miocene period, 15.9 to 13.6 million years ago. Its type locality is Barstow, which is in a Barstovian terrestrial horizon in the Barstow Formation of California.

Merriamoceros was originally named as a subspecies of Ramoceros, but later J. T. Gregory elevated it to a generic level, stating that its palmate style horns were distinct characteristics and required a separate classification. The developmental series discussed by Childs Frick further supports the hypothesis of homology between the horns of Ramoceros and Merriamoceros, with young Merriamoceros presenting three horns, reminiscent of those of Paramoceros. The horn ontogeny of these two separate genera marks an evolutionarily distinct lineage.

== Description ==
Merriamoceros was a prehistoric relative of modern pronghorn (Antilocapra americana), which is a species of artiodactyl mammal indigenous to interior western and central North America. Its remains were found in California, and were characterized by a small body size and palmate horns. It is the oldest known member of the Antilocapridae family, also known as the pronghorns. It was closely related to Ramoceros and Merycodus.

It was, like its relatives, a quadruped herbivore and grazed on the grassy plains of its time. It is not known if Merriamoceros had any predators and much is still unknown about its paleobiology, but it is assumed that it was similar to the present day pronghorn and its extinct relatives. Merriamoceros was covered in a short fur and was likely a good runner. Merriamoceros had some of the most intricate cranial appendages in the family, where the tines were on top and along the outside edges of the horns. Like related species, these were likely initially covered in skin, which gradually rubbed off to expose the bone.
