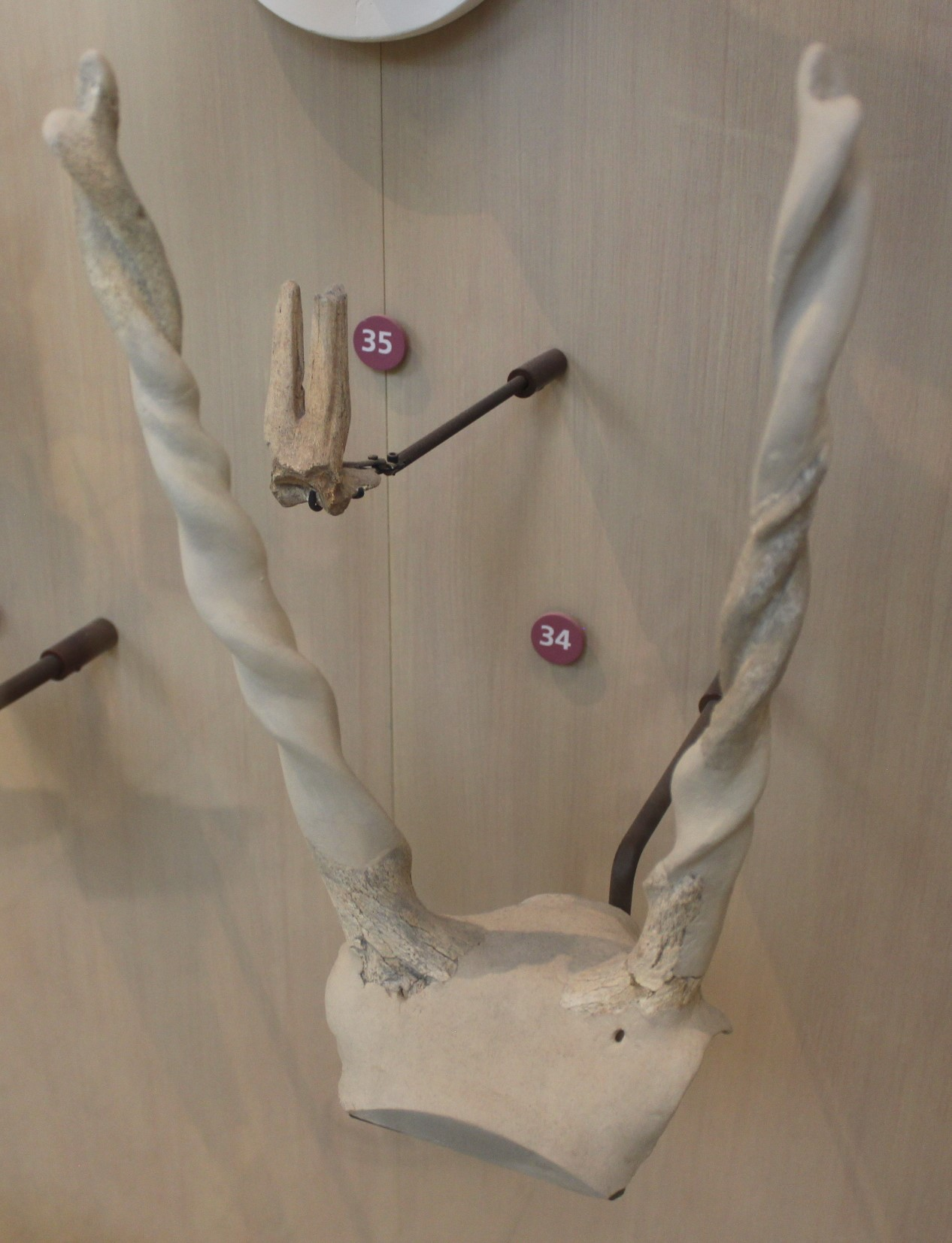
- Reconstructed horn cores of I. alexandrae, American Museum of Natural History

Scientific classification
- Domain: Eukaryota
- Kingdom: Animalia
- Phylum: Chordata
- Class: Mammalia
- Order: Artiodactyla
- Family: Antilocapridae
- Tribe: †Ilingoceratini
- Genus: †Ilingoceros; Merriam, 1909

Type species
- †Ilingoceros alexandrae

Species
- †I. alexandrae; †I. schizoceros

= Ilingoceros =

Ilingoceros Temporal range: Hemphillian

Extinct genus of mammals

Ilingoceros is an extinct genus of pronghorn artiodactyl from the Late Miocene of North America.

At 1.8 metres (5.9 ft) in body length, the animal would have been slightly bigger than the related modern pronghorn. It had straight, spiraled horns, which ended in forked tips.
