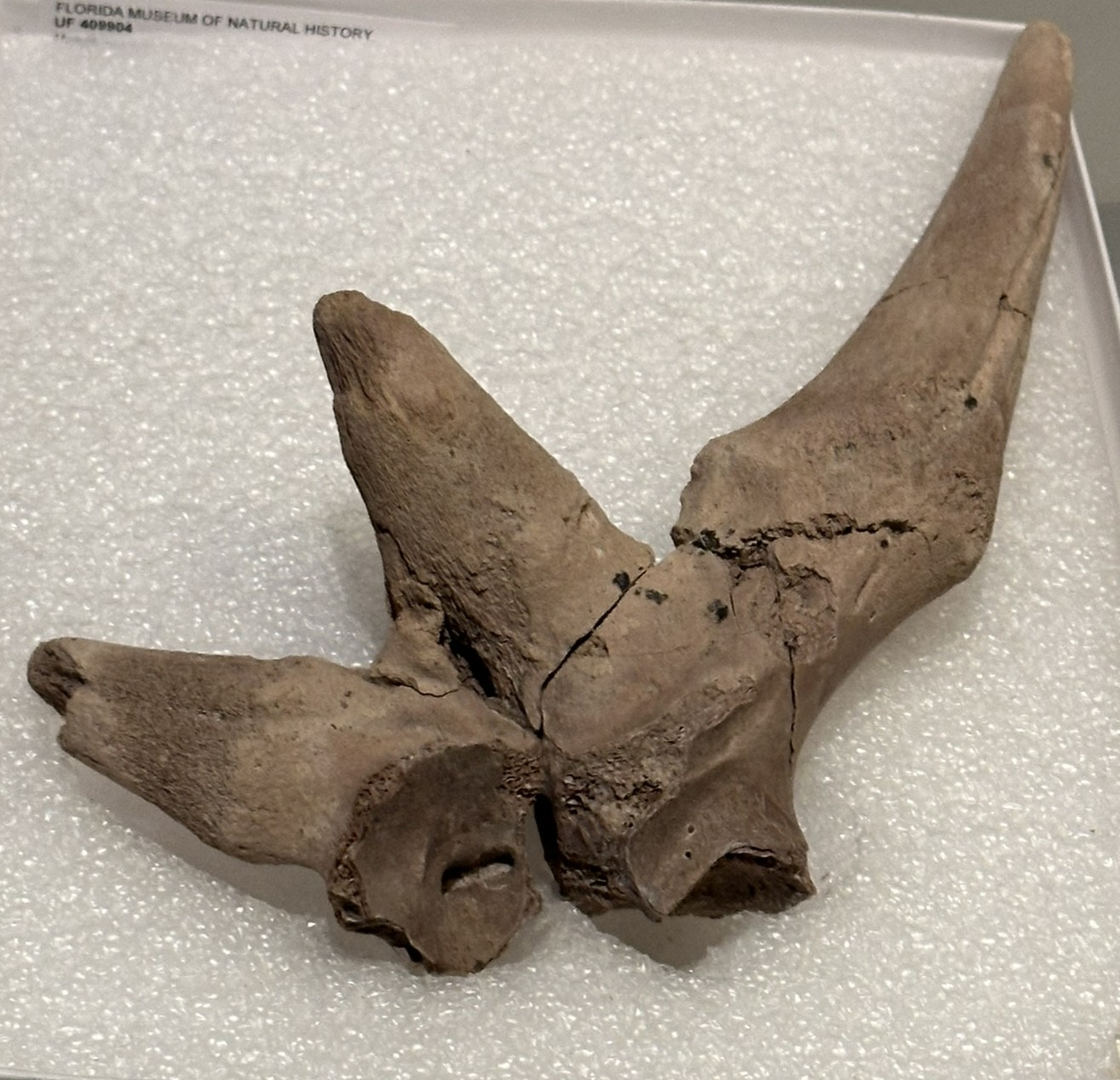
- Fossil horn cores, Florida Museum of Natural History

Scientific classification
- Domain: Eukaryota
- Kingdom: Animalia
- Phylum: Chordata
- Class: Mammalia
- Order: Artiodactyla
- Family: Antilocapridae
- Genus: †Hexameryx; White, 1941
- Species: †H. simpsoni

Binomial name
- †Hexameryx simpsoni White, 1941

= Hexameryx =

Hexameryx Temporal range: Pliocene

Extinct genus of mammals

Hexameryx is an extinct monospecific genus of the artiodactyl family Antilocapridae endemic to North America, with its remains being found exclusively in Florida. However, possible remains have been unearthed in Louisiana. It lived during the Pliocene epoch 5.3—4.9 mya. It had six well-forked horns.
