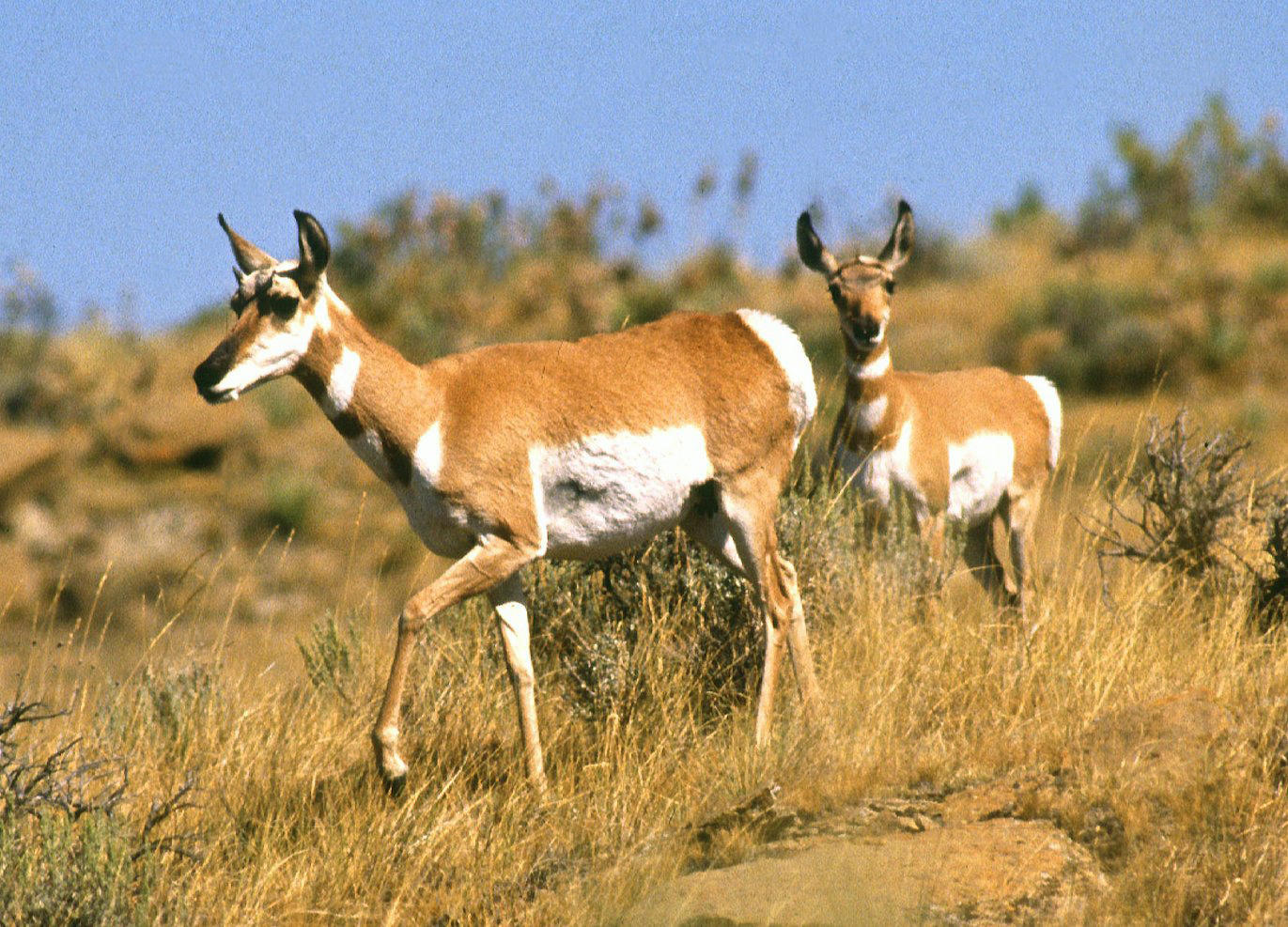
- Pronghorns in Fort Keogh, Montana

Scientific classification
- Kingdom: Animalia
- Phylum: Chordata
- Class: Mammalia
- Infraclass: Placentalia
- Order: Artiodactyla
- Suborder: Ruminantia
- Infraorder: Pecora
- Family: Antilocapridae; J. E. Gray, 1866

Type genus
- Antilocapra Ord, 1815

Genera
- See text

= Antilocapridae =

Antilocapridae Temporal range: Early Miocene–recent

Family of mammals belonging to even-toed ungulates

The Antilocapridae are a family of ruminant artiodactyls endemic to North America. Their closest extant relatives are the giraffids. Only one species, the pronghorn (Antilocapra americana), is living today; all other members of the family are extinct. The living pronghorn is a small ruminant mammal resembling an antelope.

== Description ==
In most respects, antilocaprids resemble other ruminants. They have a complex, four-chambered stomach for digesting tough plant matter, cloven hooves, and small, forked horns. Their horns resemble those of the bovids, in that they have a true horny sheath, but, uniquely, they are shed outside the breeding season, and subsequently regrown. Their lateral toes are even further diminished than in bovids, with the digits themselves being entirely lost, and only the cannon bones remaining. Antilocaprids have the same dental formula as most other ruminants: 0.0.3.33.1.3.3.

== Classification ==
The antilocaprids are ruminants of the clade Pecora. Other extant pecorans are the families Giraffidae (giraffes), Cervidae (deer), Moschidae (musk deer), and Bovidae (cattle, goats and sheep, wildebeests and allies, and antelopes). The exact interrelationships among the pecorans have been debated, mainly focusing on the placement of Giraffidae, but a large-scale ruminant genome sequencing study in 2019 suggested that Antilocapridae are the sister taxon to Giraffidae, as shown in the cladogram below.

- Ruminantia
  - Tragulina
    Tragulidae
  - Pecora
    - - Antilocapridae
      - Giraffidae
    - - Cervidae
      - - Bovidae
        - Moschidae

=== Evolution ===
The ancestors of pronghorn diverged from the giraffids in the Early Miocene. This was in part of a relatively late mammal diversification following a climate change that transformed subtropical woodlands into open savannah grasslands.

The antilocaprids evolved in North America, where they filled a niche similar to that of the bovids that evolved in the Old World. During the Miocene and Pliocene, they were a diverse and successful group, with many different species. Some had horns with bizarre shapes, or had four, or even six, horns. Examples include Osbornoceros, with smooth, slightly curved horns, Paracosoryx, with flattened horns that widened to forked tips, Merriamoceros, with fan-shaped horns, and Hayoceros, with four horns.

=== Species ===
- Subfamily Antilocaprinae
  - Tribe Antilocaprini
    - Genus Antilocapra
      - Antilocapra americana - pronghorn
        - A. a. americana - Rocky Mountain pronghorn
        - A. a. mexicana - Mexican pronghorn
        - A. a. peninsularis - Baja California pronghorn
        - A. a. sonoriensis - Sonoran pronghorn
        - A. a. oregona - Oregon pronghorn
      - †Antilocapra pacifica
    - Genus †Texoceros
      - Texoceros altidens
      - Texoceros edensis
      - Texoceros guymonensis
      - Texoceros minorei
      - Texoceros texanus
      - Texoceros vaughani
  - Tribe †Ilingocerotini
    - Genus †Ilingoceros
      - Ilingoceros alexandrae
      - Ilingoceros schizoceros
    - Genus †Ottoceros
      - Ottoceros peacevalleyensis
    - Genus †Plioceros
      - Plioceros blicki
      - Plioceros dehlini
      - Plioceros floblairi
    - Genus †Sphenophalos
      - Sphenophalos garciae
      - Sphenophalos middleswarti
      - Sphenophalos nevadanus
  - Tribe †Proantilocaprini
    - Genus †Proantilocapra
      - Proantilocapra platycornea
    - Genus †Osbornoceros
      - Osbornoceros osborni
  - Tribe †Stockocerotini
    - Genus †Capromeryx - (junior synonym Breameryx)
      - Capromeryx arizonensis - (junior synonym B. arizonensis)
      - Capromeryx furcifer - (junior synonyms B. minimus, C. minimus)
      - Capromeryx gidleyi - (junior synonym B. gidleyi)
      - Capromeryx mexicana - (junior synonym B. mexicana)
      - Capromeryx minor - (junior synonym B. minor)
      - Capromeryx tauntonensis
    - Genus †Ceratomeryx
      - Ceratomeryx prenticei
    - Genus †Hayoceros
      - Hayoceros barbouri
      - Hayoceros falkenbachi
    - Genus †Hexameryx
      - Hexameryx simpsoni
    - Genus †Hexobelomeryx
      - Hexobelomeryx fricki
      - Hexobelomeryx simpsoni
    - Genus †Stockoceros
      - Stockoceros conklingi (junior synonym S. onusrosagris)
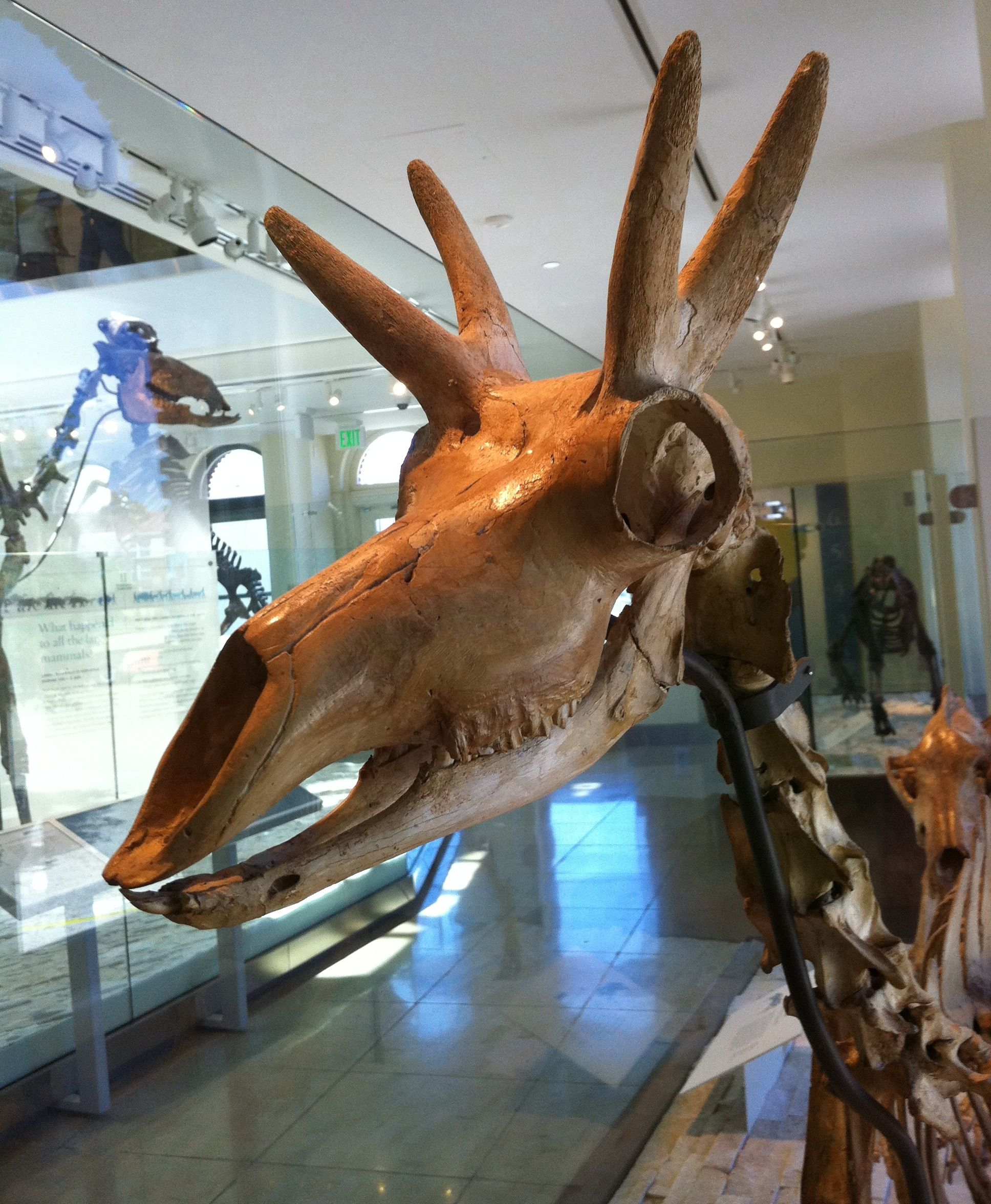
        Stockoceros conklingi skeleton
    - Genus †Tetrameryx
      - Tetrameryx irvingtonensis
      - Tetrameryx knoxensis
      - Tetrameryx mooseri
      - Tetrameryx shuleri
      - Tetrameryx tacubayensis
- Subfamily †Merycodontinae
  - Genus †Cosoryx
    - Cosoryx cerroensis
    - Cosoryx furcatus
    - Cosoryx ilfonensis
  - Genus †Merriamoceros
    - Merriamoceros coronatus
  - Genus †Merycodus (syn. Meryceros and Submeryceros)
    - Merycodus crucensis
    - Merycodus hookwayi
    - Merycodus joraki
    - Merycodus major
    - Merycodus minimus
    - Merycodus minor
    - Merycodus necatus
    - Merycodus nenzelensis
    - Merycodus prodromus
    - Merycodus sabulonis
    - Merycodus warreni
  - Genus †Paracosoryx
    - Paracosoryx alticornis
    - Paracosoryx burgensis
    - Paracosoryx dawesensis
    - Paracosoryx furlongi
    - Paracosoryx loxoceros
    - Paracosoryx nevadensis
    - Paracosoryx wilsoni
  - Genus †Ramoceros
    - Ramoceros brevicornis
    - Ramoceros marthae
    - Ramoceros merriami
    - Ramoceros osborni
    - Ramoceros palmatus
    - Ramoceros ramosus
