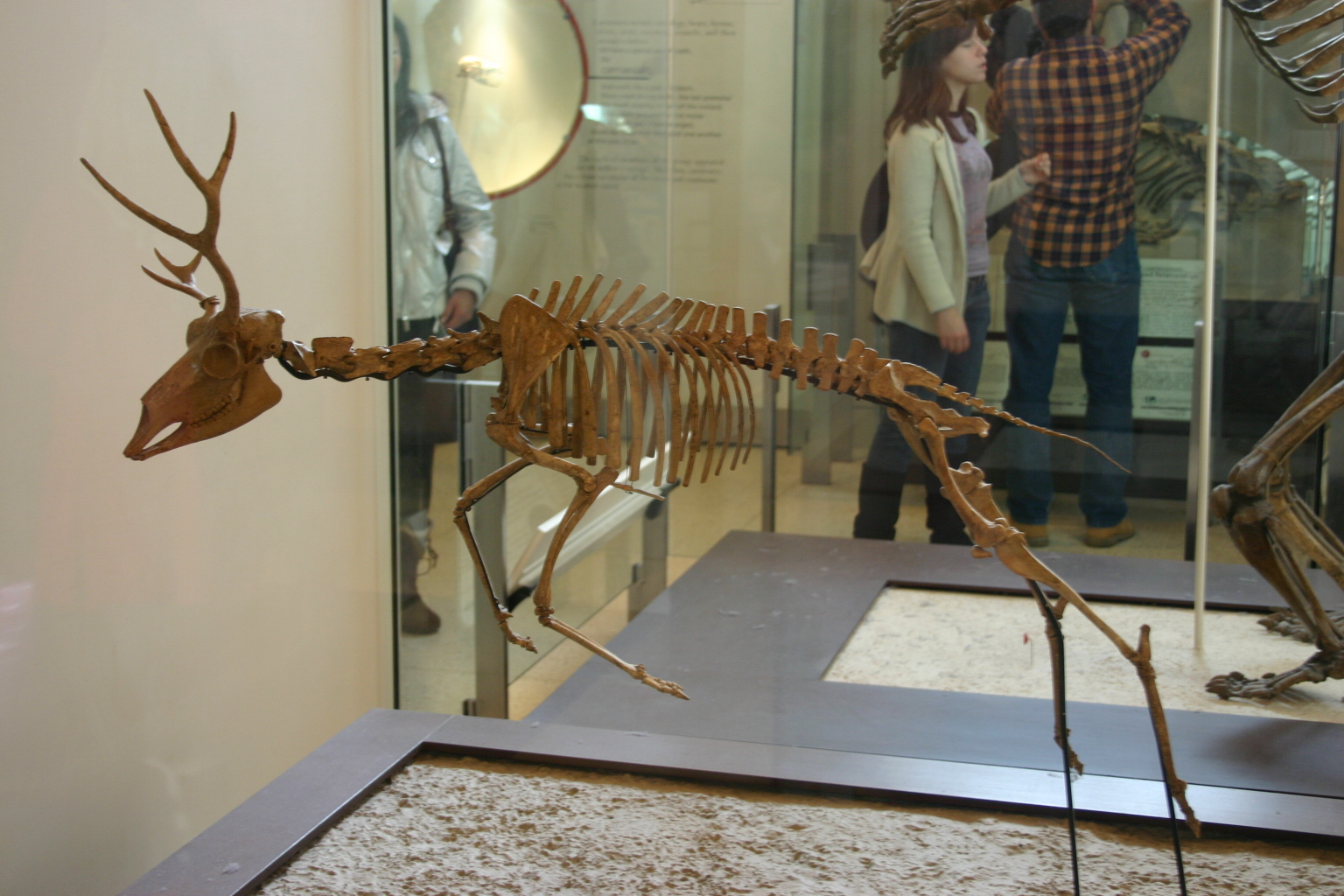
- Ramoceros osborni skeleton

Scientific classification
- Kingdom: Animalia
- Phylum: Chordata
- Class: Mammalia
- Order: Artiodactyla
- Family: Antilocapridae
- Subfamily: †Merycodontinae
- Genus: †Ramoceros; Frick, 1937

Species
- R. brevicornis; R. marthae; R. merriami; R. osborni; R. palmatus; R. ramosus

= Ramoceros =

Ramoceros Temporal range: Middle Miocene (Barstovian–Clarendonian), ~13.6–10.3 Ma

Extinct genus of mammals

Ramoceros is an extinct genus of the artiodactyl family Antilocapridae endemic to Middle Miocene (Barstovian-Clarendonian) North America.

== Taxonomy ==
Ramoceros is one of several genera that originated from the subfamily Merycodontinae, of which the pronghorn is the only surviving remnant. In fact, pronghorn is the only surviving remnant of the entire family Antilocapridae.

Merriamoceros was originally placed in Ramoceros (as Ramoceros coronatus).

== Description ==
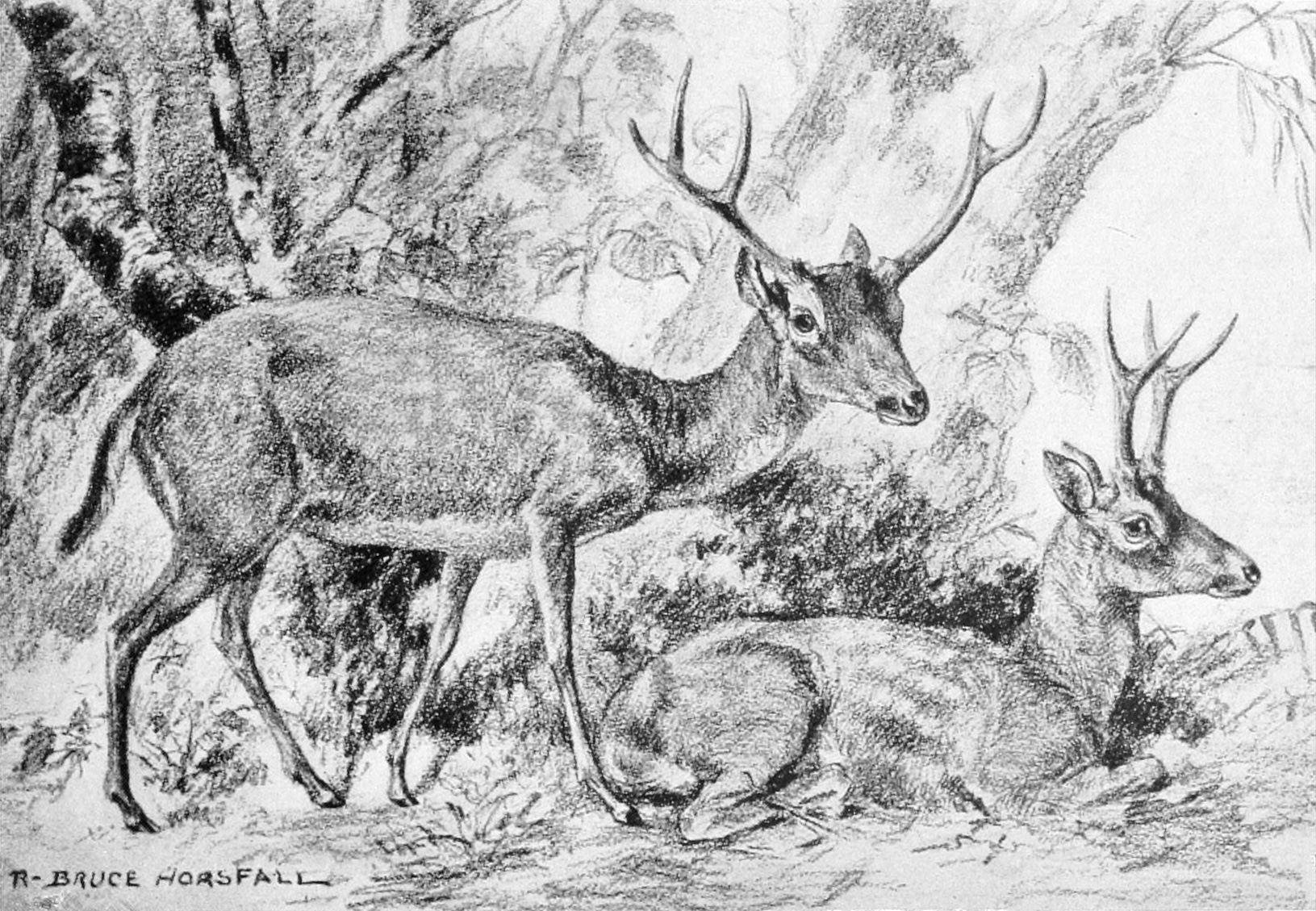
Restoration of R. osborni and Cosoryx

Ramoceros was a prehistoric relative of modern pronghorn (Antilocapra americana), which is a species of artiodactyl mammal indigenous to interior western and central North America. The modern pronghorn weighs about 35 to 70 kilograms (77 to 154 lb), whereas the smaller Ramoceros generally weighed 10 to 20 kilograms (22 to 44 lb).

The horns of Ramoceros are notable in that one horn, either the left or right, is always about three to four times larger than the other.

== Paleobiology ==
The long forked horns of Ramoceros may have been used by rival males in competition. Like other antilocaprids, Ramoceros regrew their horns every year, forming new horns growing on bony centers.

== Bibliography ==
- Vertebrate Palaeontology by Michael J. Benton
- The Evolution of Artiodactyls by Donald R. Prothero and Scott E. Foss
