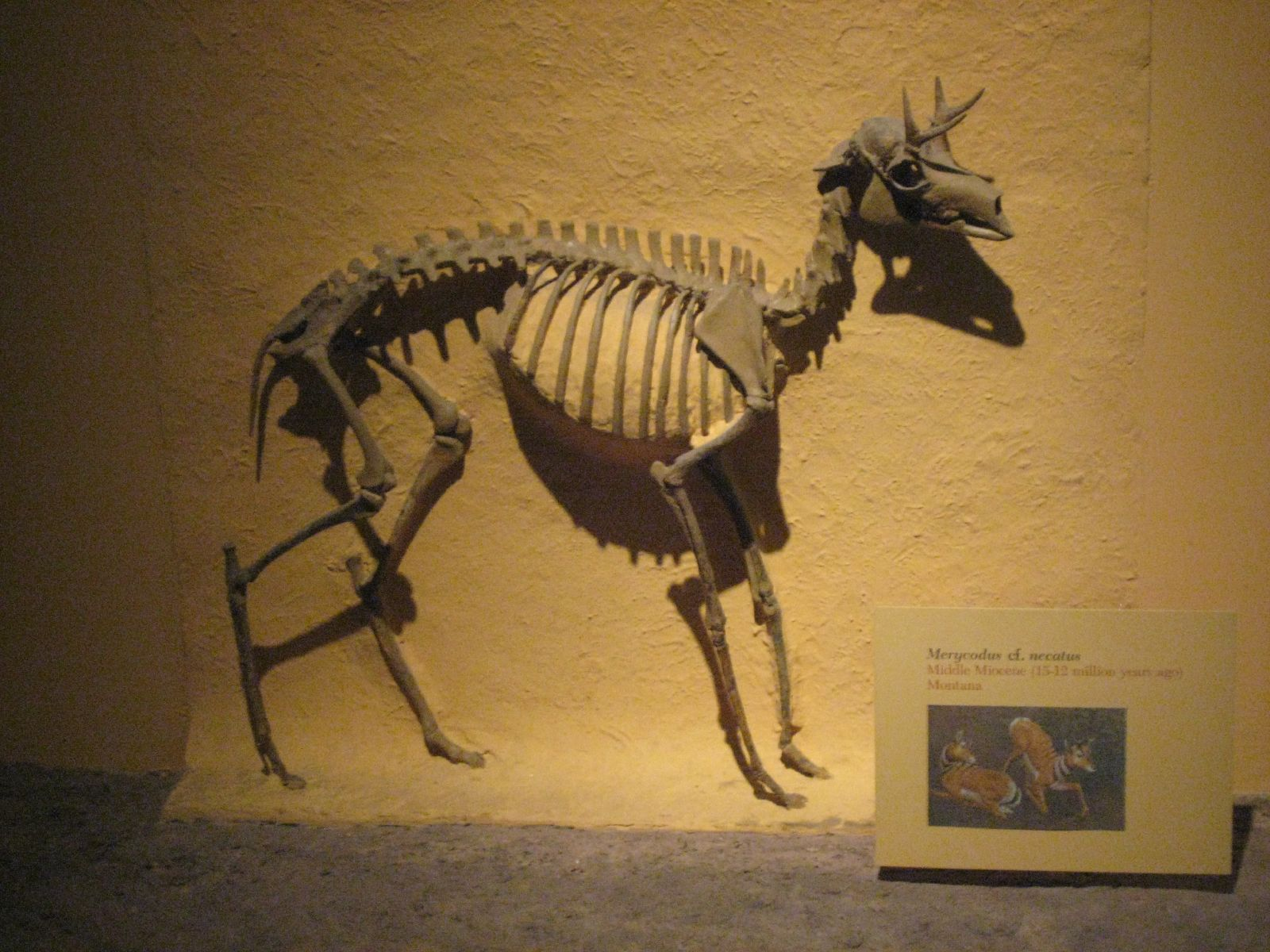
- Merycodus

Scientific classification
- Kingdom: Animalia
- Phylum: Chordata
- Class: Mammalia
- Order: Artiodactyla
- Family: Antilocapridae
- Subfamily: †Merycodontinae

Genera
- Cosoryx; Merriamoceros; Merycodus; Paracosoryx; Ramoceros

= Merycodontinae =

Extinct subfamily of mammals

Merycodontinae is a subfamily of pronghorn that arose during the middle of the Miocene and became extinct by the end of that period.

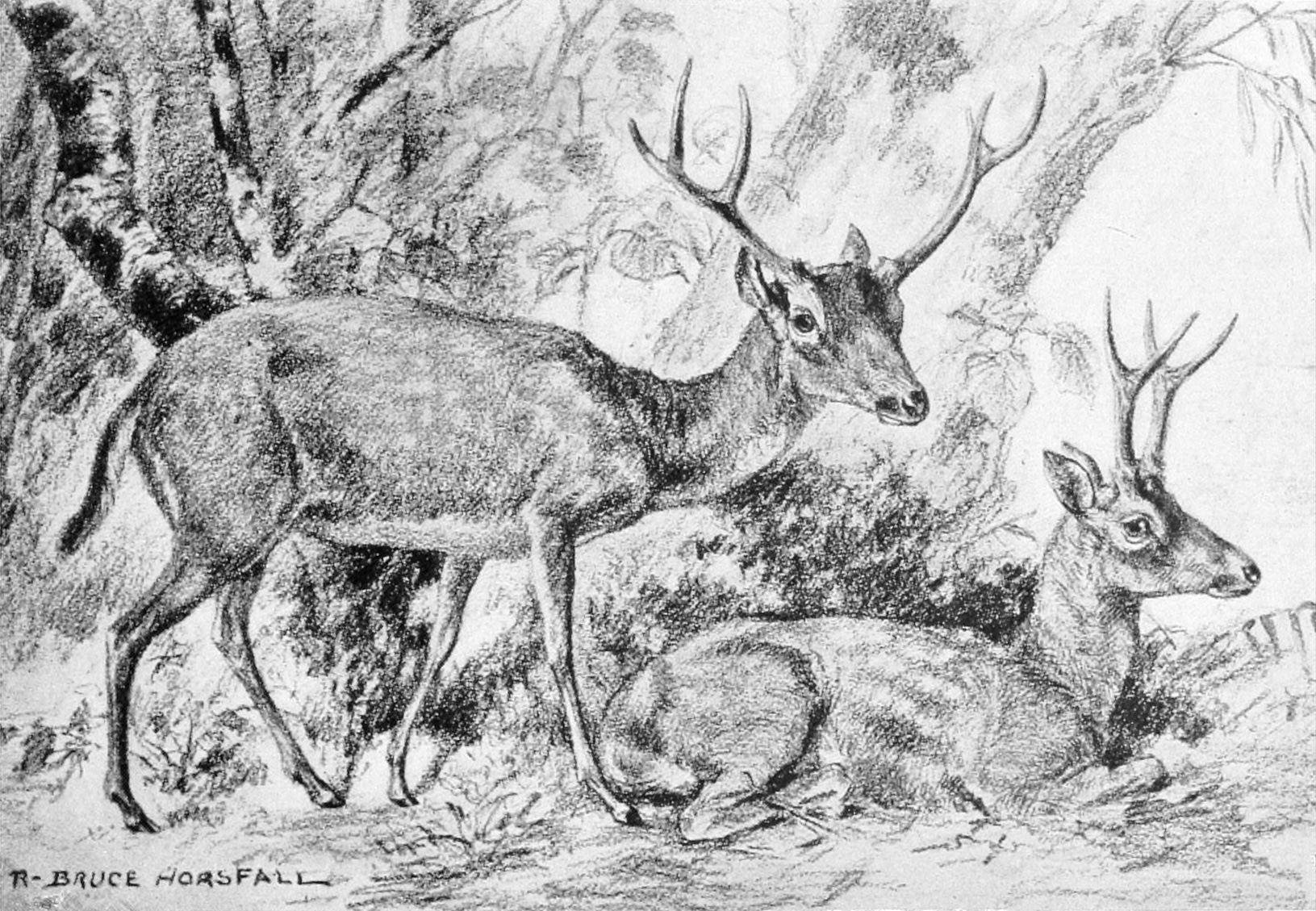
Restoration of Ramoceros and Cosoryx

The Merycondontinae were small, slightly built, fast-running ungulates. Both males and females were horned.

The genera Meryceros and Submeryceros are generally regarded as synonymous with Merycodus.

== Evolution ==
Merycodontines were indirectly adversely affected by the expansion of C_{4} grasslands in the Miocene because this evolutionary radiation increased speciation among antilocaprines, which likely caused some degree of ecological displacement in the former subfamily. Furthermore, proboscideans may have also contributed to the decline of merycodontines by inhibiting their speciation rate.
