= Antilocapra pacifica =

Antilocapra pacifica Temporal range: Late Pleistocene

Scientific classification
- Domain: Eukaryota
- Kingdom: Animalia
- Phylum: Chordata
- Class: Mammalia
- Order: Artiodactyla
- Family: Antilocapridae
- Genus: Antilocapra
- Species: †A. pacifica

Binomial name
- †Antilocapra pacifica Richards & McCrossin, 1991

Extinct species of pronghorn

Antilocapra pacifica, also known as the Pacific pronghorn, is an extinct antilocaprid from the Late Pleistocene of California.

== Description ==
The Pacific pronghorn was described in 1991 from material found near the San Joaquin River delta in the vicinity of Antioch, California. While closely related to the living pronghorn, it is distinguished by aspects of horn core, orbit and temporal-fossa morphology. The Pacific pronghorn was also slightly larger than its living relative.
