= Hexobelomeryx =

Hexobelomeryx Temporal range: Pliocene

Scientific classification
- Kingdom: Animalia
- Phylum: Chordata
- Class: Mammalia
- Order: Artiodactyla
- Family: Antilocapridae
- Genus: †Hexobelomeryx
- Species: †H. fricki

Binomial name
- †Hexobelomeryx fricki Furlong, 1941

Extinct genus of antilocaprids

Hexobelomeryx is an extinct genus of antilocaprid ungulate that lived in North America during the Pliocene epoch.

== Palaeobiology ==
=== Palaeoecology ===
Dental mesowear and discriminant function analysis of Hexobelomeryx fricki fossilised tooth specimens from the Pliocene-aged site of San Miguel de Allende in Guanajuato show that they were mixed feeders or browsers.
