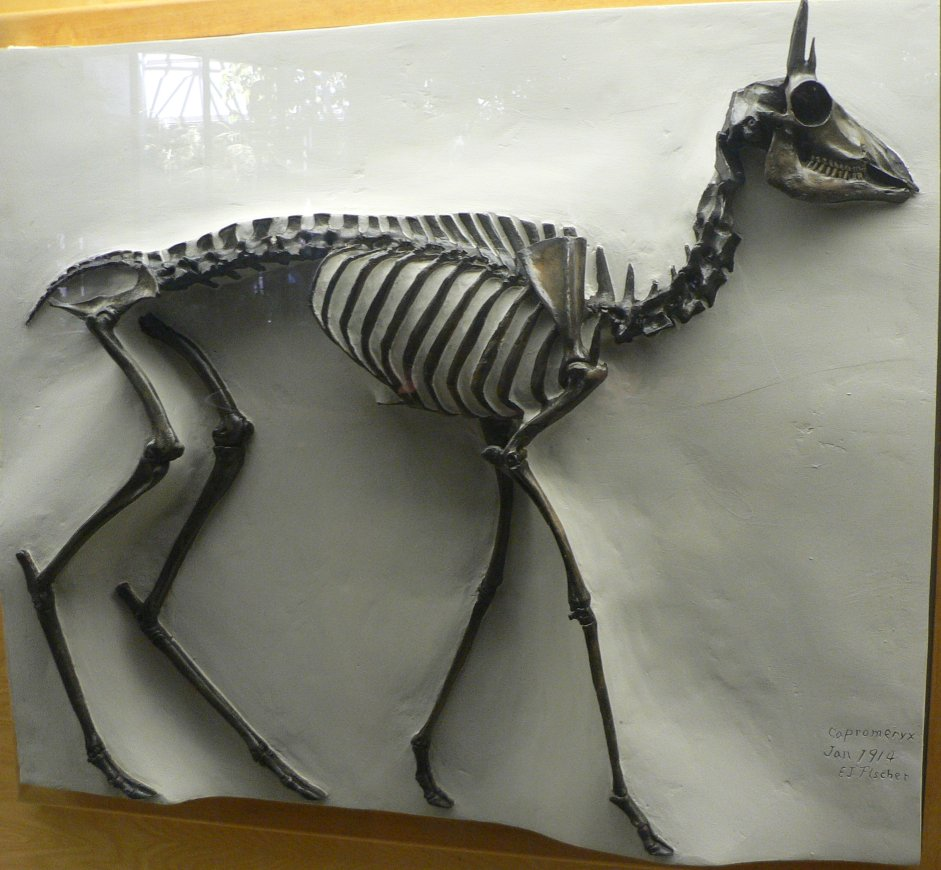
- Photo Author: David Monniaux Photo of a skeleton recovered from the La Brea Asphalt Pits

Scientific classification
- Kingdom: Animalia
- Phylum: Chordata
- Class: Mammalia
- Order: Artiodactyla
- Family: Antilocapridae
- Genus: †Capromeryx; Matthew, 1902

Type species
- †Capromeryx furcifer Matthew, 1902

Species
- C. arizonensis; C. furcifer; C. gidleyi; C. mexicanus; C. minor; C. tauntonensis

Synonyms
- Breameryx

= Capromeryx =

Capromeryx Temporal range: Pliocene–Late Pleistocene

Extinct genus of mammals

Capromeryx (dwarf pronghorn) is an extinct genus of dwarf pronghorns (Antilocapridae) that originated in North America during the Pliocene about 5 million years ago (the exact range of their presence on the landscape is still not known, but the most recent fossils found date to the terminal Pleistocene). Antilocaprines began to decline in diversity during the Late Miocene, and the closest living relative and only surviving antilocaprine is the North American pronghorn (Antilocapra americana).

== Description ==
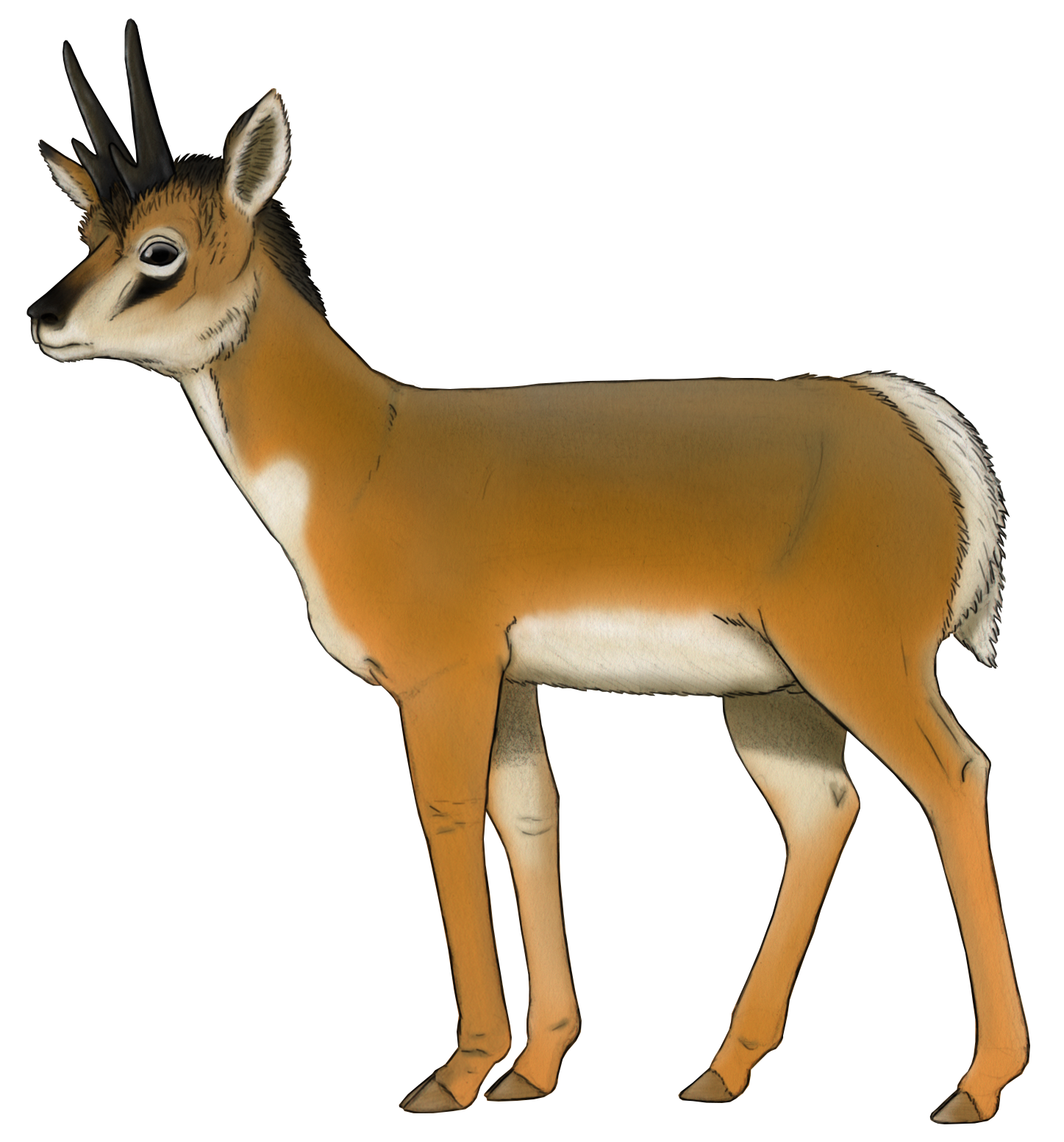
Reconstruction of Capromeryx minor based on La Brea Tar Pits specimen, illustration by Joaquín Eng Ponce.

Capromeryx were the smallest members of the pronghorn family Antilocapridae. They are recognized by having two upright horns that are conical in shape (wider at the base and tapering toward the top). The United States distribution of this genus includes: Arizona, California, Florida, New Mexico, Texas, and Washington. Fossils have also been found in the Mexican states of: Chihuahua, Sonara, and Baja California. Many Capromeryx fossils have been found in tar pits, and juveniles are especially common. One such location is the Rancho La Brea Tar Pits in Los Angeles, where enough bones have been unearthed to produce a full skeleton sample of Capromeryx minor.

Much like the living pronghorns that exist today, the habitat that these animals were thought to inhabit were grassy plains with some shrubs and large trees for them to take refuge in. It is still unknown what exactly they ate and how they interacted socially but it is speculated that they were similar in many ways to their living relatives, the North American Pronghorn.

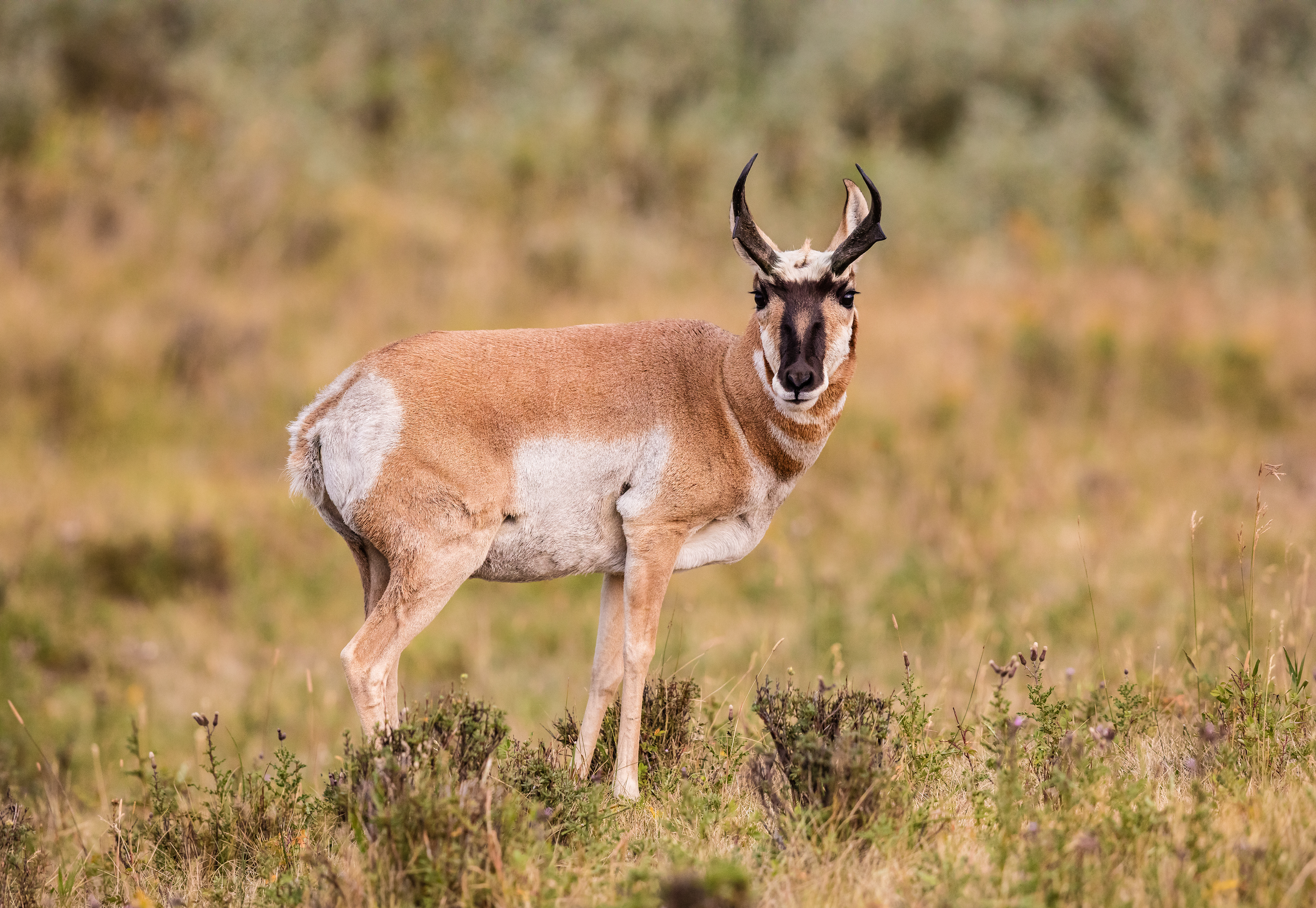
The only living relative of Capromeryx, Antilocapra americana.

== Classification ==
Though the identification of Capromeryx often relies on the basis of tooth size and shape, the description and acceptance of the various species of Capromeryx requires the fossil presence of horn cores (the bony inner shaft of the horn). Some species have not yet produced these cores and therefore have not been recognized as distinct species. Fossil specimens are instead classified by size. Fossils identified as the family Antilocapridae are similarly distributed into genus by size, with Capromeryx being the smallest of the known Pronghorns.

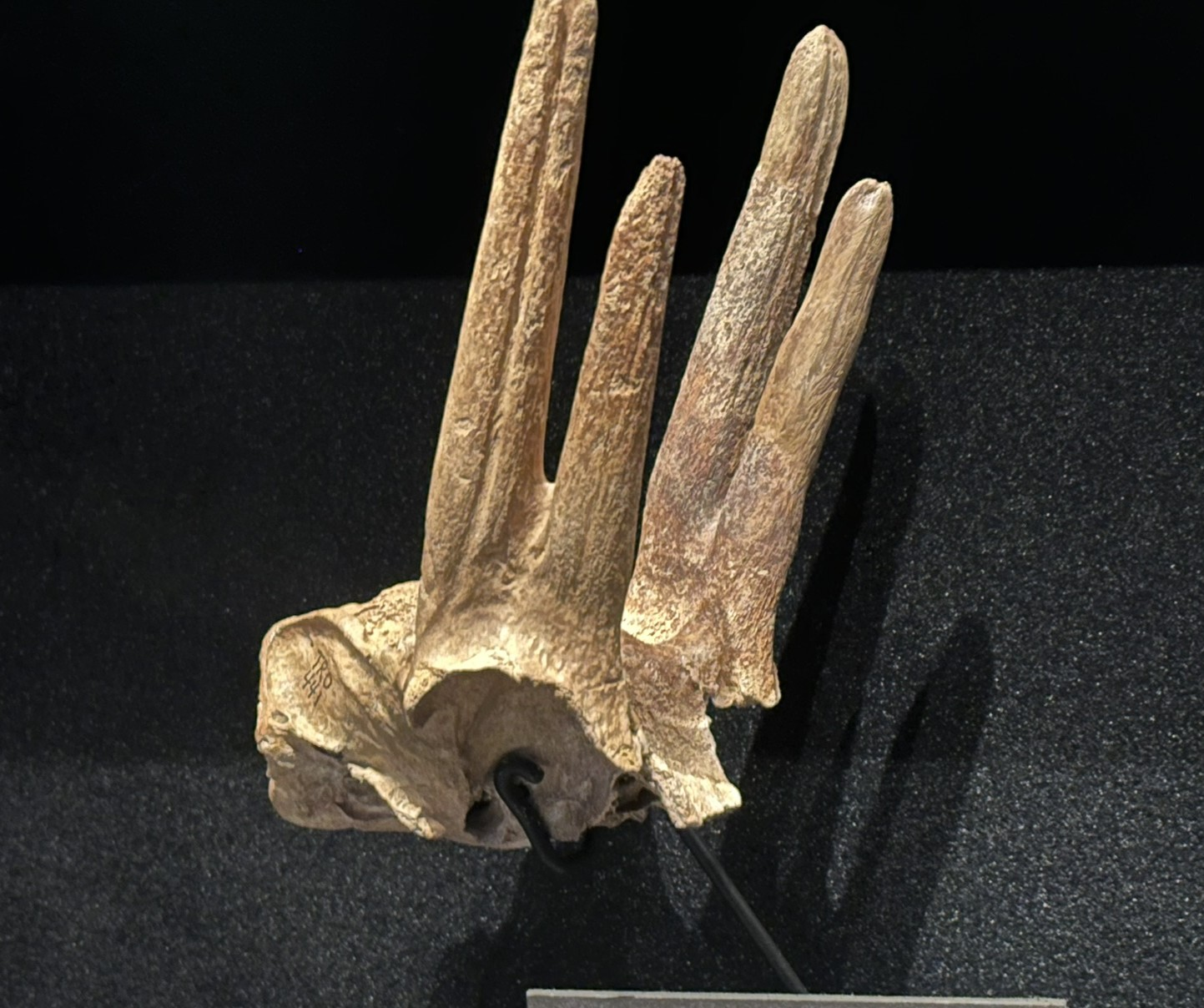
Cranium (with antlers) of C. arizonensis, Florida Museum of Natural History

There are several species of Capromeryx, however only four have been formally recognized, and even these are likely all the same:

- Capromeryx arizonensis
- Capromeryx furcifer: one of the smallest artiodactyls known, being 24 inches (61 cm) at the shoulder and 25 pounds (11 kg) in weight.
- Capromeryx tauntonensis
- Capromeryx minor: discovered in the La Brea Tar Pits of California and elsewhere. It has been found at least as far east as the coast of Texas. It stood about 60 centimetres tall at the shoulders and weighed about 10 kilograms (22 lb). It is unclear whether females had horns as well as males. Each horn consists of a pair of short, straight points that sprout from a single base on either side of the head, with the two prongs parallel rather than diverging as in Tetrameryx and Stockoceros.

Some described but unrecognized species include:

- Capromeryx mexicana
- Capromeryx gidleyi

Capromeryx furcifer would have priority as the proper name for the Late Irvingtonian through Rancholabrean species in which the anterior prong is less than 50% the height of the posterior prong. Its fossils have also been found at least as far east at as the Texas coast, as well as in Nebraska, Kansas, New Mexico, Sonora, Baja California, and near Mexico City. Specimens of this species (and its synonyms) date to the Late Irvingtonian and Rancholabrean periods. Two earlier species are known: Capromeryx tautonensis from Washington state and from Central Mexico in the Early Blancan, and Capromeryx arizonensis from the Late Blancan in Arizona, New Mexico and Florida. These two earlier species were larger and heavier than the Pleistocene species.

== Discovery and species ==
The earliest fossil records of Capromeryx are dated to 5 million years ago, during the Pliocene, and the most recent are dated to the terminal Pleistocene near the time of their extinction. The fossils over time showed a distinct change in size for the Capromeryx, as they started out with larger bodies and distinct two pronged horns with a smaller anterior prong and a large posterior prong, and evolved to become smaller with less distinct horns, where the anterior prong was barely visible due to the decreased size under the horn sheath.

The first description of C. furcifer was in 1902 by W.D. Matthew in New Mexico, but it has been found in other locations as well but by other individuals (Hay Springs, Nebraska and La Brea, California are two such locations).

The first description of C. arizonensis was in 1942 by M. F. Skinner also found in New Mexico at two sites called Pearsons Mesa and Caballo. These sites are described as being late Blancan.

James K. Morgan and Neil H. Morgan were the first to describe C. tauntonensis in 1995 in the Journal of Vertebrate Paleontology. They discovered the fossils that included horn cores and teeth during a dig (from 1988 to 1992) in Blancan sediments in Adams County, Washington.

== Behavior ==
It is thought by some biologists that it lived in forests and underbrush, where its small size would have helped it to hide. It is unlikely that it lived in open prairies, since it would not have been fast enough to outrun the predators of that time.

== Extinction ==
It is unknown why exactly Capromeryx disappeared from the North American landscape.
