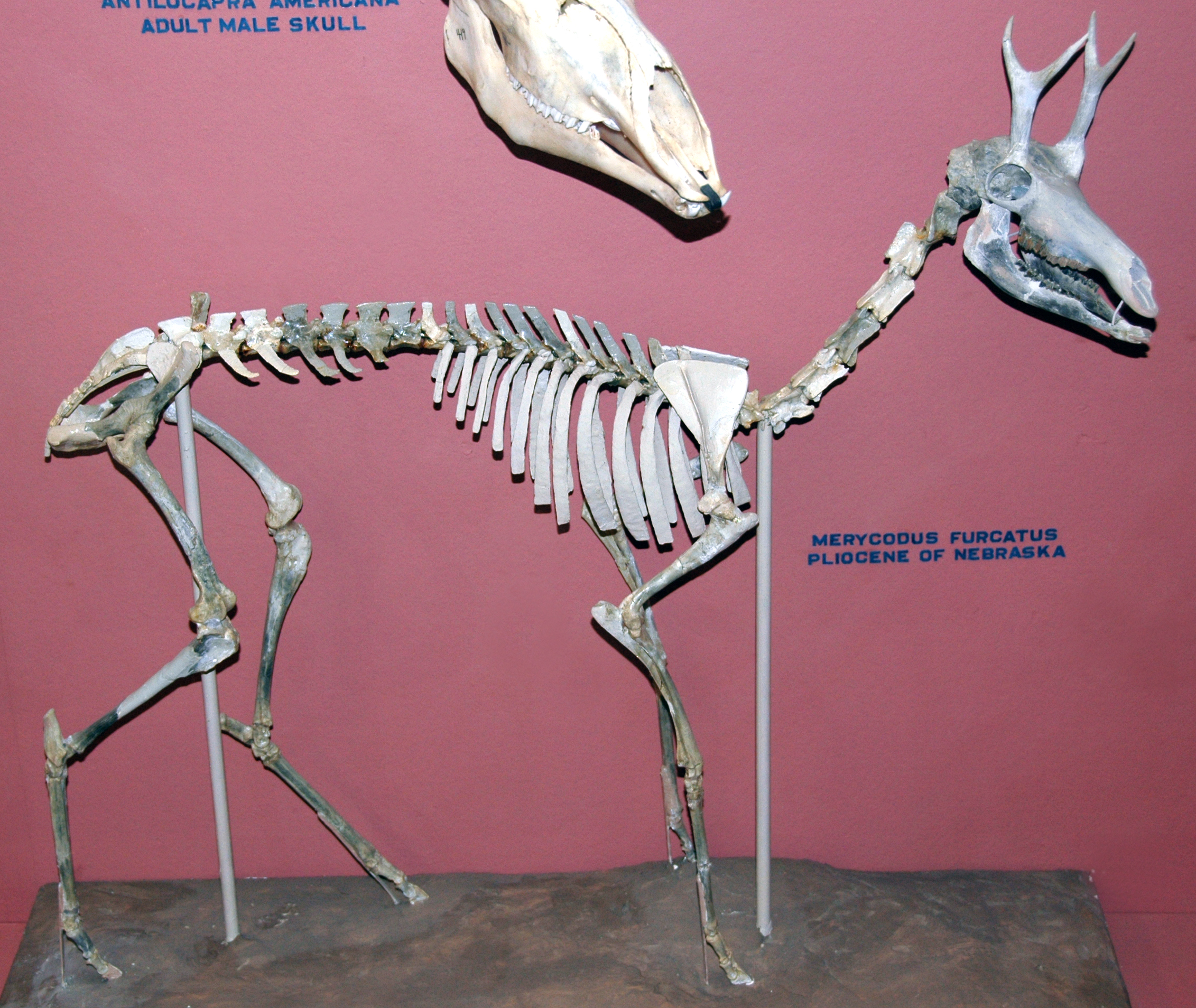
- C. furcatus mount

Scientific classification
- Kingdom: Animalia
- Phylum: Chordata
- Class: Mammalia
- Order: Artiodactyla
- Family: Antilocapridae
- Subfamily: †Merycodontinae
- Genus: †Cosoryx; Leidy, 1869

Type species
- †Cosoryx furcatus Leidy, 1869

Species
- C. cerroensis; C. furcatus; C. ilfonensis

= Cosoryx =

Cosoryx Temporal range: Miocene

Extinct species of mammals

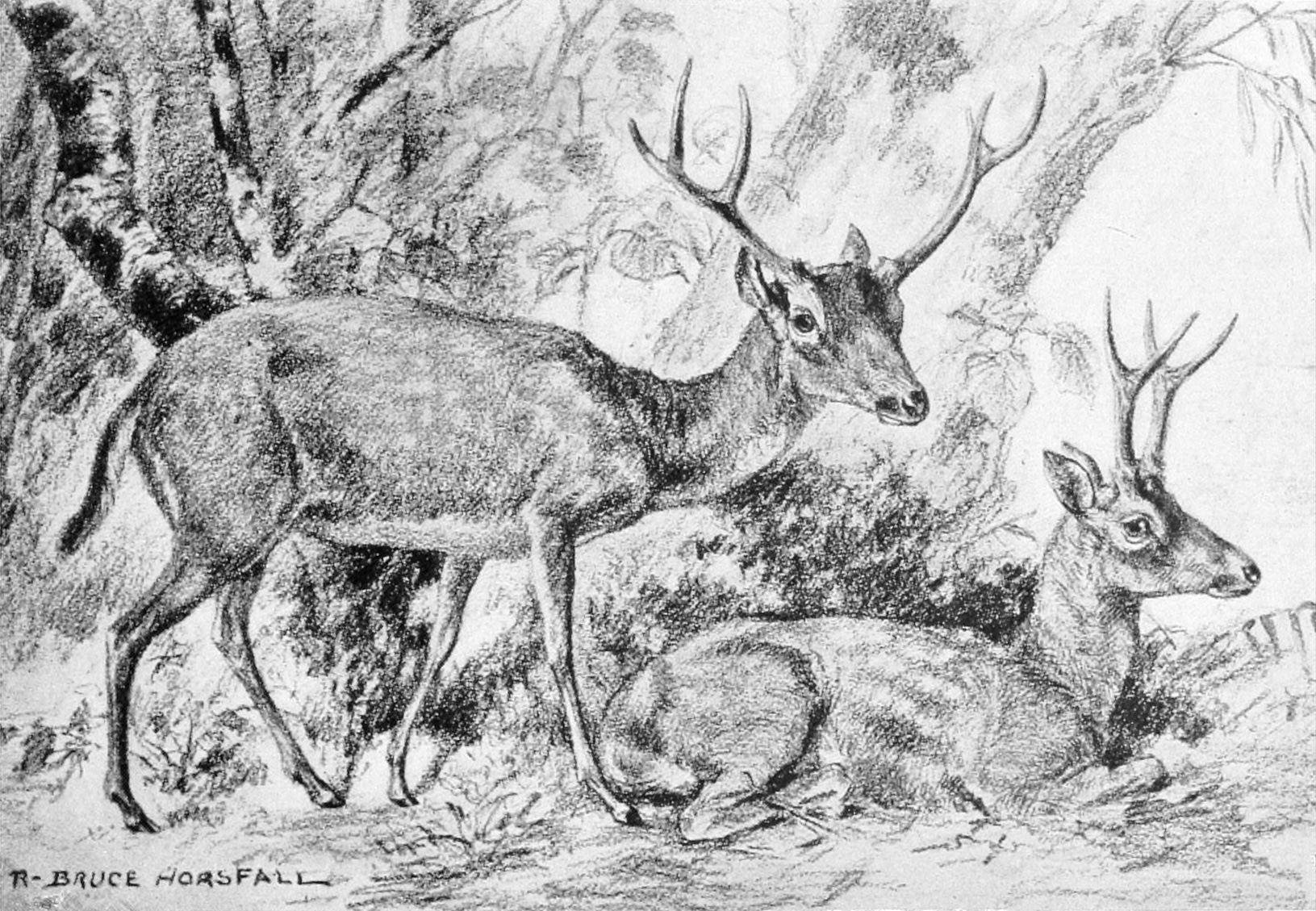
Restoration of Ramoceros and Cosoryx

Cosoryx is an extinct genus of antilocaprid that lived in the Miocene of Nevada. Fossils of this genus have also been found in the Santa Fe Group in New Mexico.

Cosoryx has sometimes been considered synonymous with Merycodus.
