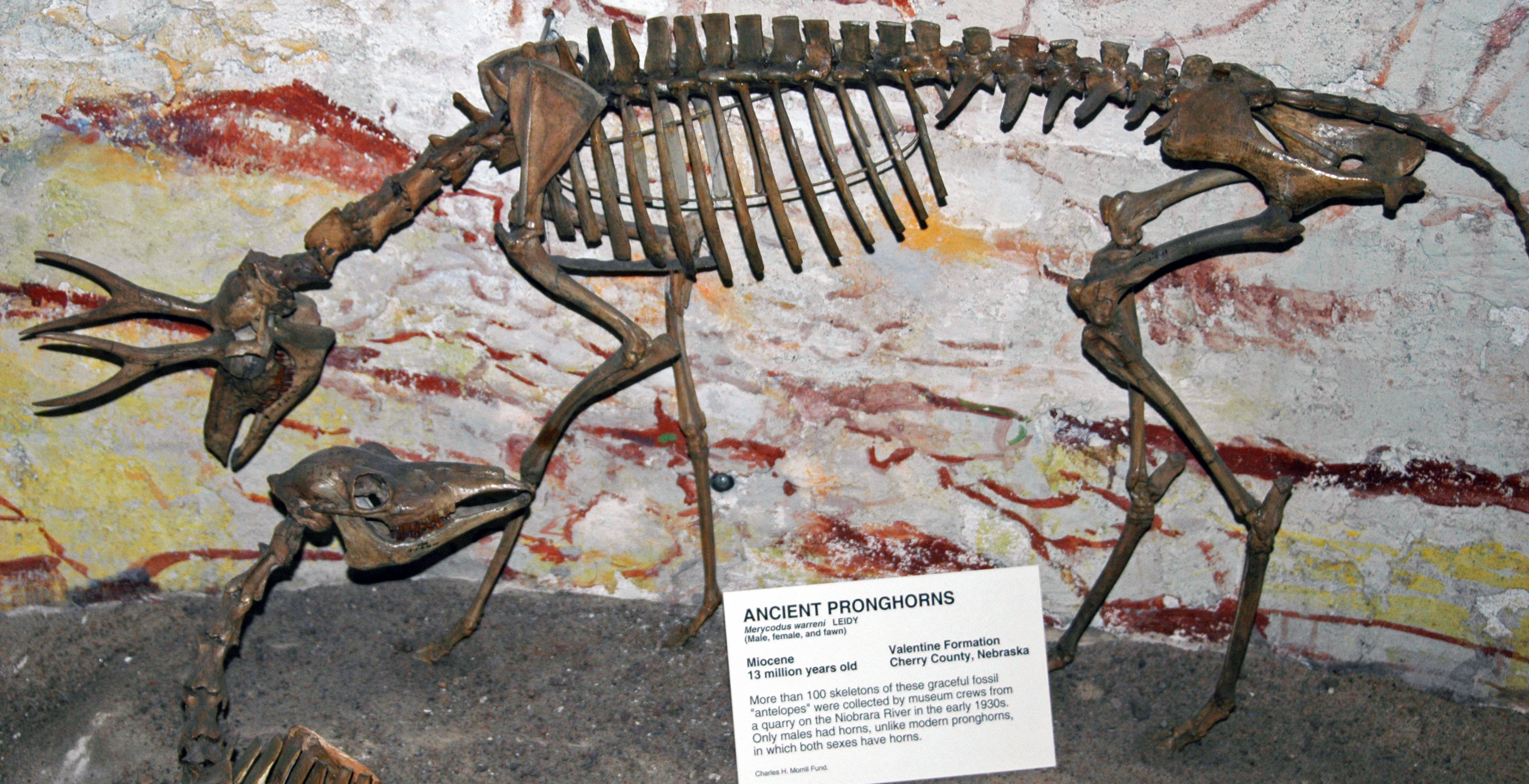
- Male and female M. warreni

Scientific classification
- Kingdom: Animalia
- Phylum: Chordata
- Class: Mammalia
- Order: Artiodactyla
- Family: Antilocapridae
- Subfamily: †Merycodontinae
- Genus: †Merycodus; Leidy, 1854

Species
- M. crusensis; M. hookwayi; M. joraki; M. major; M. minimus; M. minor; M. necatus; M. nenzelensis; M. prodromus; M. sabulonis; M. warreni; M. osborni

Synonyms
- Meryceros; Submeryceros

= Merycodus =

Merycodus Temporal range: Miocene

Extinct genus of mammals

Merycodus is an extinct genus of the artiodactyl family Antilocapridae. Fossils of this genus have been found in the Santa Fe Group of New Mexico.

== Taxonomy ==
Merycodus has had a confusing taxonomic history. In older literature, Merycodus was placed in Cervidae, though an Antilocaprid affinity is more believed. The closely related Meryceros and Submeryceros are generally regarded as synonymous with Merycodus. One described species known as Merycodus grandis has now been reclassified as a species of Prosynthetoceras. Another former species, M. furcatus is now placed in Cosoryx.

== Description ==
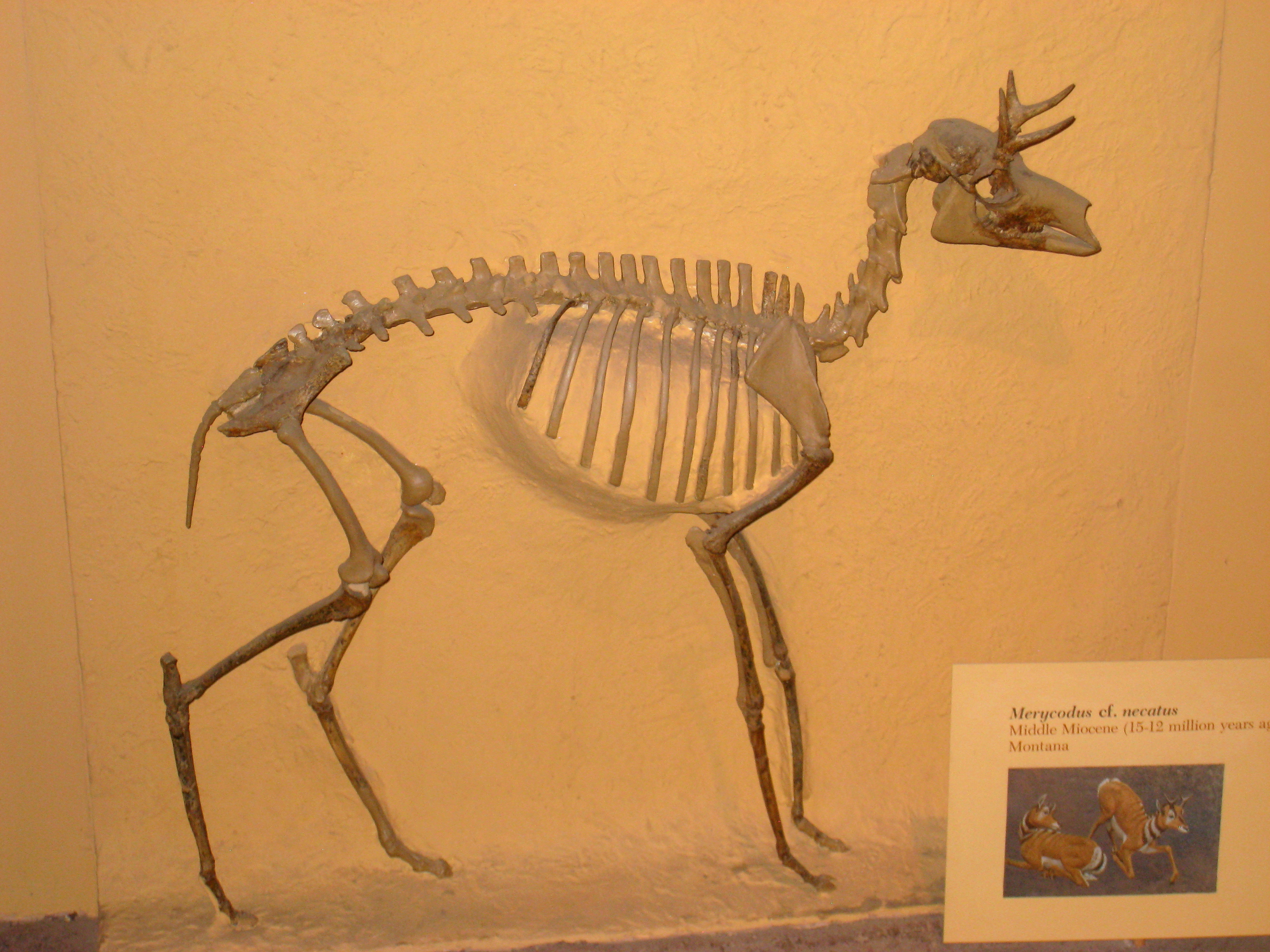
M. cf. nectatus

Merycodus had relatively short horn shafts with tines of nearly equal size that were about as long as the shaft. Species traditionally included in Meryceros had horns that were generally larger and more laterally compressed. The horns typically have 3 tines. Merycodus had hypsodont teeth. There is no indication of lateral digits in any of the feet of Merycodus.
