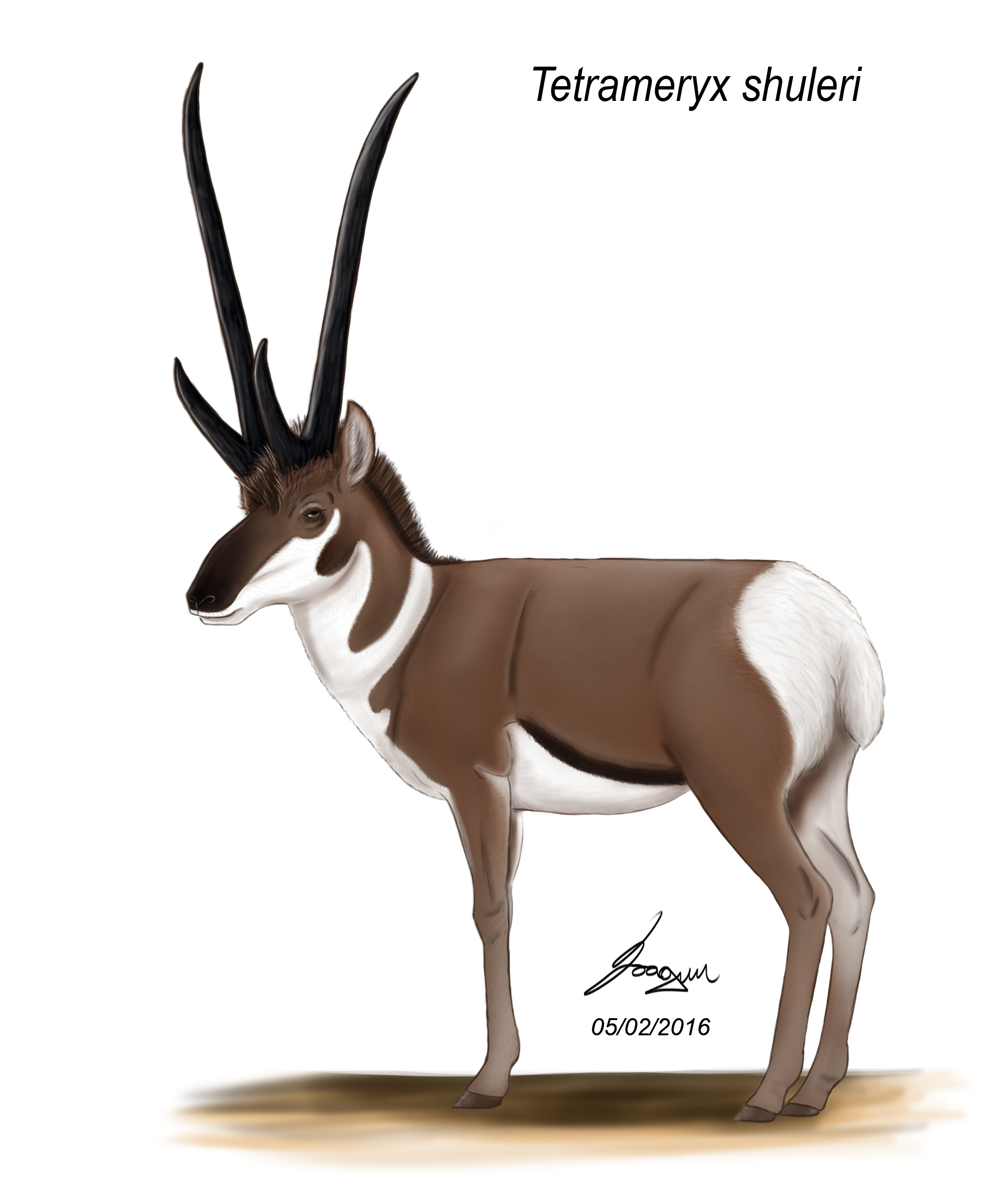
- Depiction of T. shuleri based on modern pronghorns

Scientific classification
- Domain: Eukaryota
- Kingdom: Animalia
- Phylum: Chordata
- Class: Mammalia
- Order: Artiodactyla
- Family: Antilocapridae
- Genus: †Tetrameryx; Lull, 1921

Species
- T. irvingtonensis Stirton, 1939; T. knoxensis Hibbard and Dalquest, 1960; T. mooseri Dalquest, 1974; T. shuleri Lull, 1921; T. tacubayensis Mooser and Dalquest, 1975

= Tetrameryx =

Tetrameryx Temporal range: 1.8–0.012 Ma

Extinct genus of mammals

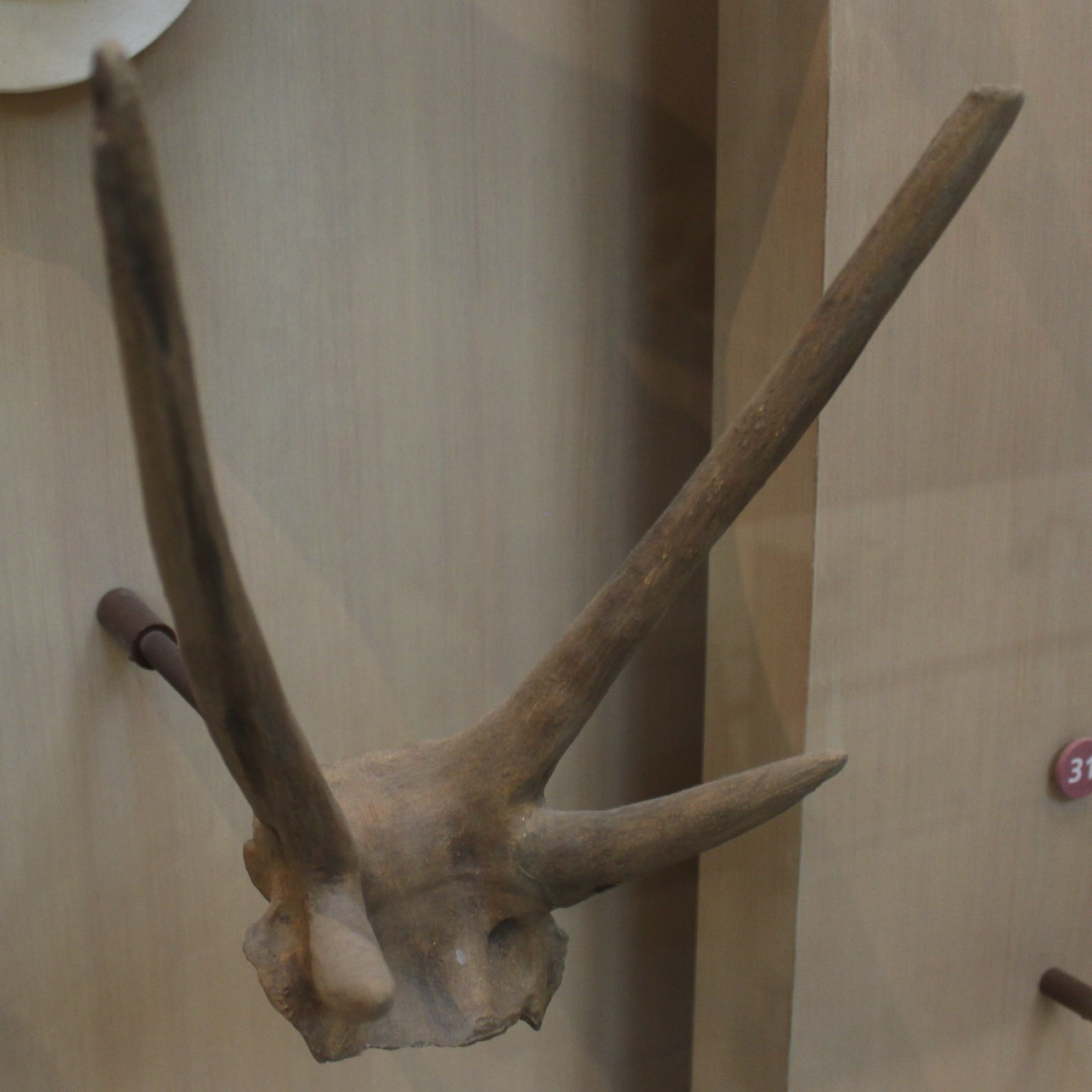
Horn cores of T. schuleri, American Museum of Natural History

Tetrameryx is an extinct genus of the North American artiodactyl family Antilocapridae, known from Mexico, the western United States, and Saskatchewan in Canada.

== Taxonomy ==
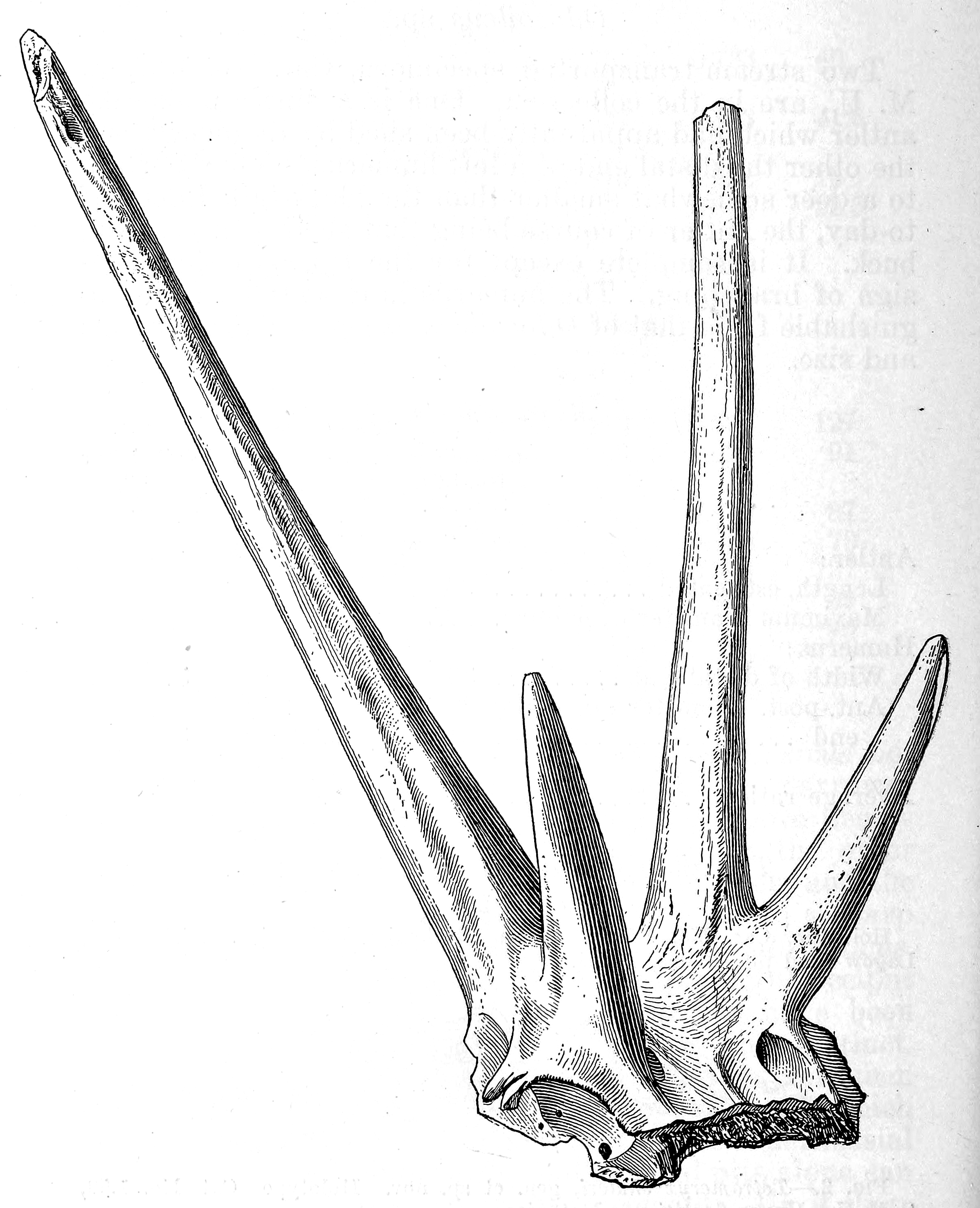
T. shuleri holotype skull

The name means "four [horned] ruminant", referring to the division of each horn near its base into two prongs; in T. shuleri, the rear prong is much longer. 5 species are known.

== Description ==
One member of the genus, T. shuleri, survived until about 12,000 years ago, and was present when Paleo-Indians reached North America. Although approximately the same size as the living pronghorn, the limb bones are somewhat more robust, suggesting that its running speed was slower than living pronghorn.
