= List of multituberculate species =

This is a taxonomic list of species in the extinct mammalian order Multituberculata.

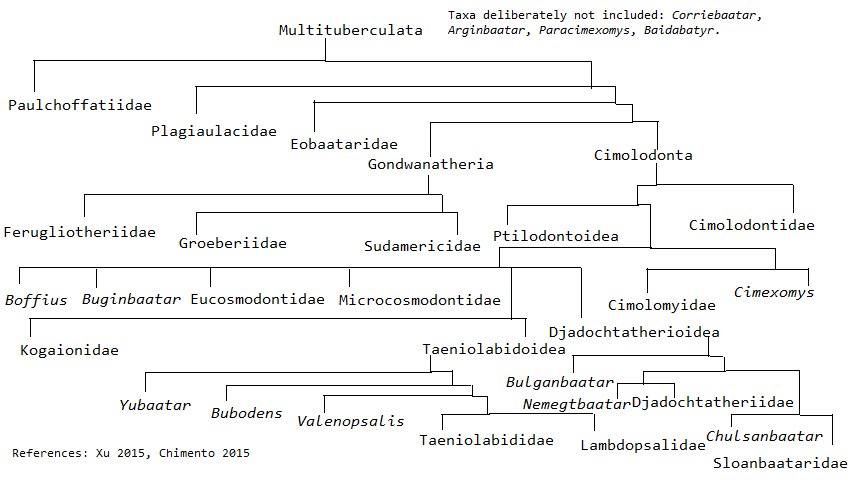
Multituberculate phylogenetic tree based on L. Xu, X. Zhang, H. Pu, S. Jia, and J. Zhang, J., and J. Meng. 2015. Largest known Mesozoic multituberculate from Eurasia and implications for multituberculate evolution and biology. Scientific Reports 5(14950):1-11 and Nicolás R. Chimento, Federico L. Agnolin and Fernando E. Novas (2015). "The bizarre 'metatherians' Groeberia and Patagonia, late surviving members of gondwanatherian mammals". Historical Biology: An International Journal of Paleobiology. 27 (5): 603–623. doi:10.1080/08912963.2014.903945.

== Order †Multituberculata Cope, 1884 ==
=== Suborder †Plagiaulacida Simpson 1925 ===
- Family †Paulchoffatiidae Hahn, 1969
  - subfamily †Paulchoffatiinae Hahn, 1971
    - Genus †Paulchoffatia Kühne, 1961
      - Species †P. delgador Kühne, 1961
    - Genus †Pseudobolodon Hahn, 1977
      - Species †P. oreas Hahn, 1977
      - Species †P. krebsi Hahn & Hahn, 1994
    - Genus †Henkelodon Hahn, 1987
      - Species †H. naias Hahn, 1987
    - Genus †Guimarotodon Hahn, 1969
      - Species †G. leiriensis Hahn, 1969
    - Genus †Meketibolodon (Hahn, 1978) Hahn, 1993
      - Species †M. robustus (Hahn, 1978) Hahn, 1993
    - Genus †Plesiochoffatia Hahn & Hahn, 1999
      - Species †P. thoas Hahn & Hahn, 1998
      - Species †P. peparethos Hahn & Hahn, 1998
      - Species †P. staphylos Hahn & Hahn, 1998
    - Genus †Xenachoffatia Hahn & Hahn, 1998
      - Species †X. oinopion Hahn & Hahn, 1998
    - Genus †Bathmochoffatia Hahn & Hahn, 1998
      - Species †B. hapax Hahn & Hahn, 1998
    - Genus †Kielanodon Hahn, 1987
      - Species †K. hopsoni Hahn, 1987
    - Genus †Meketichoffatia Hahn, 1993
      - Species †M. krausei Hahn, 1993
    - Genus †Galveodon Hahn & Hahn, 1992
      - Species †G. nannothus Hahn & Hahn, 1992
    - Genus †Sunnyodon Kielan-Jaworowska & Ensom, 1992
      - Species †S. notleyi Kielan-Jaworowska & Ensom, 1992
  - Subfamily †Kuehneodontinae Hahn, 1971
    - Genus †Kuehneodon Hahn, 1969
      - Species †K. dietrichi Hahn, 1969
      - Species †K. barcasensis Hahn & Hahn, 2001
      - Species †K. dryas Hahn, 1977
      - Species †K. guimarotensis Hahn, 1969
      - Species †K. hahni Antunes, 1988
      - Species †K. simpsoni Hahn, 1969
      - Species †K. uniradiculatus Hahn, 1978
- Family †Pinheirodontidae Hahn & Hahn, 1999
  - Genus †Pinheirodon Hahn & Hahn, 1999
    - Species †P. pygmaeus Hahn & Hahn, 1999
    - Species †P. vastus Hahn & Hahn, 1999
  - Genus †Bernardodon Hahn & Hahn, 1999
    - Species †B. atlanticus Hahn & Hahn, 1999
    - Species †B. sp. Hahn & Hahn, 1999
    - Genus †Gerhardodon Kielan-Jaworowska & Ensom, 1992
    - Species †G. purbeckensis Kielan-Jaworowska & Ensom, 1992
  - Genus †Iberodon Hahn & Hahn, 1999
    - Species †I. quadrituberculatus Hahn & Hahn, 1999
  - Genus †Lavocatia Canudo & Cuenca-Bescós, 1996
    - Species †L. alfambrensis Canudo & Cuenca-Bescós, 1996
  - Genus †Ecprepaulax Hahn & Hahn, 1999
    - Species †E. anomala Hahn & Hahn, 1999
- Family †Allodontidae Marsh, 1889
  - Genus †Ctenacodon Marsh, 1879
    - Species †C. serratus Marsh, 1879
    - Species †C. nanus Marsh, 1881
    - Species †C. laticeps Marsh, 1881
    - Species †C. scindens Simpson, 1928
  - Genus †Psalodon Simpson, 1926
    - Species †P. potens Marsh, 1887
    - Species †P. fortis Marsh, 1887
    - Species †P. marshi Simpson, 1929
- Family †Zofiabaataridae Bakker, 1992
  - Genus †Zofiabaatar Bakker & Carpenter, 1990
    - Species †Z. pulcher Bakker & Carpenter, 1990
- Family Incertae sedis
  - Genus †Glirodon Engelmann & Callison, 2001
    - Species †G. grandis Engelmann & Callison, 2001
- Family †Plagiaulacidae Gill, 1872
  - Genus? †Morrisonodon Hahn and Hahn, 2004
    - Species? †M. brentbaatar Bakker, 1998
  - Genus †Plagiaulax Falconer, 1857
    - Species †P. becklesii Falconer, 1857
  - Genus †Bolodon Owen, 1871
    - Species †B. crassidens Owen, 1871
    - Species †B. falconeri Owen, 1871
    - Species †B. minor Falconer, 1857
    - Species †B. osborni Simpson, 1928
    - Species †B. elongatus Simpson, 1928
- Family †Eobaataridae Kielan-Jaworowska, Dashzeveg & Trofimov, 1987
  - Genus †Eobaatar
    - Species †E. magnus Kielan-Jaworowska, Dashzeveg & Trofimov, 1987
    - Species †E. minor Kielan-Jaworowska, Dashzeveg & Trofimov, 1987
    - Species †E. hispanicus Hahn & Hahn, 1992
    - Species †E. pajaronensis Hahn & Hahn, 2001
  - Genus †Iberica Badiola et al., 2011
    - Species †Iberica hahni Badiola et al., 2011
  - Genus †Loxaulax Simpson, 1928
    - Species †L. valdensis Simpson, 1928
  - Genus †Monobaatar Kielan-Jaworowska, Dashzeveg & Trofimov, 1987
    - Species †M. mimicus Kielan-Jaworowska, Dashzeveg & Trofimov, 1987
  - Genus †Parendotherium Crusafont Pairó & Adrover, 1966
    - Species †P. herreroi Crusafont Pairó & Adrover, 1966
  - Genus †Sinobaatar Hu & Wang, 2002
    - Species †S. lingyuanensis Hu & Wang, 2002
    - Species †S. xiei Kusuhashi et al., 2009
    - Species †S. fuxinensis Kusuhashi et al., 2009
  - Genus †Heishanobaatar Kusuhashi et al., 2010
    - Species †H. triangulus Kusuhashi et al., 2010
  - Genus †Liaobaatar Kusuhashi et al., 2009
    - Species †L. changi Kusuhashi et al., 2009
  - Genus †Hakusanobaatar Kusuhashi et al., 2008
    - Species †H. matsuoi Kusuhashi et al., 2008
  - Genus †Tedoribaatar Kusuhashi et al., 2008
    - Species †T. reini Kusuhashi et al., 2008
  - Genus †Teutonodon Martin et al 2016
    - Species †Teutonodon langenbergensis Martin et al 2016
- Family †Albionbaataridae Kielan-Jaworowska & Ensom, 1994
  - Genus †Albionbaatar Kielan-Jaworowska & Ensom, 1994
    - Species †A. denisae Kielan-Jaworowska & Ensom, 1994
  - Genus †Proalbionbaatar Hahn & Hahn, 1998
    - Species †P. plagiocyrtus Hahn & Hahn, 1998
  - Genus †Kielanobaatar Kusuhashi et al., 2010
    - Species †K. badaohaoensis Kusuhashi et al., 2010
- Family †Arginbaataridae Hahn & Hahn, 1983
  - Genus †Arginbaatar Trofimov, 1980
    - Species †A. dmitrievae Trofimov, 1980

=== Suborder †Gondwanatheria ===
- Family †Groeberiidae Patterson, 1952
  - †G. minoprioi Ryan Patterson, 1952
  - †G. pattersoni G. G. Simpson, 1970
  - ?†K. charrieri Flynn & Wyss 1999
  - ?†K. major Goin et al. 2010
  - ?†E. verticalis Goin et al. 2010
  - ?†P. aberrans Goin et al. 2010
- Family †Ferugliotheriidae Bonaparte 1986
  - †Ferugliotherium windhauseni Bonaparte 1986a [Vucetichia Bonaparte 1990; Vucetichia gracilis Bonaparte 1990]
  - †Trapalcotherium matuastensis Rougier et al. 2008
- Family †Sudamericidae Scillato-Yané & Pascual 1984 [Gondwanatheridae Bonaparte 1986]
  - †Greniodon sylvanicus Goin et al. 2012
  - †Vintana sertichi Krause et al. 2014
  - †Dakshina jederi Wilson, Das Sarama & Anantharaman 2007
  - †Gondwanatherium patagonicum Bonaparte 1986
  - †Sudamerica ameghinoi Scillato-Yané & Pascual 1984
  - †Lavanify miolaka Krause et al. 1997
  - †Bharattherium bonapartei Prasad et al. 2007
  - †Patagonia peregrina Pascual & Carlini 1987

=== Suborder †Cimolodonta McKenna, 1975 ===
Superfamily Incertae sedis

- Family Incertae sedis
  - Subfamily Incertae sedis
    - Genus? †Ameribaatar Eaton & Cifelli, 2001
      - Species? †A. zofiae Eaton & Cifelli, 2001
    - Genus †Ptilodus (Marsh, 1889) Gidley, 1909
      - Species †P. serratus (Marsh, 1889) Gidley, 1909
    - Genus? †Uzbekbaatar Kielan-Jaworowska & Nesov, 1992
      - Species? †U. kizylkumensis Kielan-Jaworowska & Nesov, 1992
  - Paracimexomys group Archibald, 1982
    - Genus Paracimexomys Archibald, 1982
      - Species? †P. crossi Cifelli, 1997
      - Species †P. magnus (Sahni, 1972) Archibald, 1982 [Cimexomys magnus Sahni, 1972]
      - Species †P. magister (Fox, 1971) Archibald, 1982 [Cimexomys magister Fox, 1971]
      - Species †P. perplexus Eaton & Cifelli, 2001
      - Species †P. robisoni Eaton & Nelson, 1991
      - Species †P. priscus (Lillegraven, 1969) Archibald, 1982 [Cimexomys priscus Lillegraven, 1969; genotype Paracimexomys sensu Eaton & Cifelli, 2001]
      - Species †P. propriscus Hunter et al., 2010
    - Genus Cimexomys Sloan & Van Valen, 1965
      - Species †C. antiquus Fox, 1971
      - Species †C. gregoryi Eaton, 1993
      - Species †C. judithae Sahni, 1972 [Paracimexomys? judithae (Sahni, 1972) Archibald, 1982]
      - Species †C. arapahoensis
      - Species †C. minor Sloan & Van Valen, 1965
      - Species? †C. gratus (Jepson, 1930) Lofgren, 1995 [Cimexomys hausoi Archibald, 1983; Eucosmodon gratus Jepson, 1930; Mesodma? ambigua? Jepson, 1940; Stygimus gratus Jepson, 1930]
    - Genus †Bryceomys Eaton, 1995
      - Species †B. fumosus Eaton, 1995
      - Species †B. hadrosus Eaton, 1995
      - Species †B. intermedius Eaton & Cifelli, 2001
    - Genus †Cedaromys Eaton & Cifelli, 2001
      - Species †C. bestia (Eaton & Nelson, 1991) Eaton & Cifelli, 2001 [=Paracimexomys? bestia Eaton & Nelson, 1991]
      - Species †C. parvus Eaton & Cifelli, 2001
    - Genus? †Dakotamys Eaton, 1995; E. Cret. CNA.
      - Species †D. malcolmi Eaton, 1995
- Family †Boffidae Hahn & Hahn, 1983
  - Genus †Boffius Vianey-Liaud, 1979
    - Species †Boffius splendidus Vianey-Liaud, 1979 [Boffiidae Hahn & Hahn, 1983 sensu Kielan-Jaworowska & Hurum, 2001]
- Family †Cimolomyidae Marsh, 1889 sensu Kielan-Jaworowska & Hurum, 2001
  - Genus †Essonodon Simpson, 1927
    - Species? †E. browni Simpson, 1927 [cimolodontidae? Kielan-Jaworowska & Hurum 2001]
  - Genus †Buginbaatar Kielan-Jaworowska & Sochava, 1969
    - Species? †B. transaltaiensis Kielan-Jaworowska & Sochava, 1969
  - Genus †Meniscoessus Cope, 1882 [Dipriodon Marsh, 1889, Tripriodon Marsh, 1889, Selenacodon Marsh, 1889, Halodon Marsh, 1889, Oracodon Marsh, 1889]
    - Species †M. caperatus Marsh, 1889
    - Species †M. collomensis Lillegraven, 1987
    - Species †M. ferox Fox, 1971a
    - Species †M. intermedius Fox, 1976b
    - Species †M. major Russell, 1936
    - Species †M. robustus Marsh, 1889
    - Species †M. seminoensis Eberle & Lillegraven, 1998a
  - Genus †Cimolomys Marsh, 1889 [=? Allacodon Marsh, 1889; Selenacodon Marsh, 1889]
    - Species †C. clarki Sahni, 1972
    - Species †C. gracilis Marsh, 1889 [Cimolomys digona Marsh, 1889; Meniscoessus brevis; Ptilodus gracilis Osborn, 1893; Selenacodon brevis Marsh, 1889]
    - Species †C. trochuus Lillegraven, 1969
    - Species †C. milliensis Eaton, 1993a

Superfamily †Ptilodontoidea Cope, 1887 sensu McKenna & Bell, 1997 e Kielan-Jaworowska & Hurum, 2001

- Family †Cimolodontidae Marsh, 1889 sensu Kielan-Jaworowska & Hurum, 2001
  - Genus †Liotomus Lemoine, 1882
    - Species? †L. marshi (Lemoine, 1882) Cope, 1884 [Neoctenacodon marshi Lemoine, 1882?] [eucosmodontidae? McKenna & Bell, 1997]
  - Genus †Anconodon Jepsen, 1940
    - Species? †A. lewisi Simpson, 1935
    - Species †A. gibleyi Simpson, 1935
    - Species †A. cochranensis Russell, 1929 [Liotomus russelli (Simpson, 1935); Ectopodon cochranensis (Russell, 1967)]
  - Genus †Cimolodon Marsh, 1889 [Nanomys Marsh, 1889, Nonomyops Marsh, 1892]
    - Species †C. electus
    - Species †C. nitidus Marsh, 1889 [Allacodon rarus Marsh, 1892 sensu Clemens, 1964a; Nanomys minutus Marsh, 1889; Nonomyops minutus (Marsh, 1889) Marsh, 1892]
    - Species †C. parvus
    - Species †C. similis Fox, 1971
- Family Incertae sedis
  - Genus Neoliotomus Jepsen, 1930
    - Species †N. conventus Jepsen, 1930
    - Species †N. ultimus Granger & Simpson, 1928
- Family †Neoplagiaulacidae Ameghino, 1890 [Neoplagiaulacinae Ameghino, 1890 sensu McKenna & Bell, 1997]
  - Genus †Mesodma Marsh, 1889
    - Species? †M. hensleighi
    - Species? †M. senecta
    - Species? †M. garfieldensis Archibald, 1982
    - Species? †M. pygmaea Sloan, 1987
    - Species †M. formosa Marsh, 1889 [Halodon formosus Marsh, 1889??]
    - Species †M. primaeva [Perectypodus primaeva]
    - Species †M. thompsoni Clemens, 1964
  - Genus Ectypodus Matthew & Cranger, 1921 [Charlesmooria Kühne, 1969 ]
    - Species †E. aphronorus Sloan, 1981
    - Species? †E. childei Kühne, 1969
    - Species? †E. elaphus Scott, 2005
    - Species? †E. lovei (Sloan, 1966) Krishtlaka & Black, 1975
    - Species †E. musculus Matthew & Granger, 1921
    - Species †E. powelli Jepsen, 1940
    - Species? †E. simpsoni Jepsen, 1930
    - Species †E. szalayi Sloan, 1981
    - Species †E. tardus Jepsen, 1930
  - Genus †Mimetodon Jepsen, 1940
    - Species †M. krausei Sloan, 1981
    - Species †M. nanophus Holtzman, 1978 [Neoplagiaulax nanophus Holtzman, 1978]
    - Species †M. siberlingi(Simpson, 1935) Schiebout, 1974
    - Species †M. churchilli Jepsen, 1940
  - Genus †Neoplagiaulax Lemoine, 1882
    - Species †N. annae Vianey-Liaud, 1986
    - Species? †N. burgessi Archibald, 1982
    - Species †N. cimolodontoides Scott, 2005
    - Species †N. copei Lemoine, 1885
    - Species †N. donaldorum Scott & Krause, 2006
    - Species †N. eocaenus Lemoine, 1880
    - Species †N. grangeri Simpson, 1935
    - Species †N. hazeni Jepsen, 1940
    - Species †N. hunteri Krishtalka, 1973
    - Species †N. jepi Sloan, 1987
    - Species †N. kremnus Johnston & Fox, 1984
    - Species †N. macintyrei Slaon, 1981
    - Species †N. macrotomeus Wilson, 1956
    - Species †N. mckennai Sloan, 1987
    - Species †N. nelsoni Sloan, 1987
    - Species †N. nicolai Vianey-Liaud, 1986
    - Species †N. paskapooensis Scott, 2005
    - Species? †N. serrator Scott, 2005
    - Species †N. sylvani Vianey-Liaud, 1986
  - Genus †Parectypodus Jepsen, 1930
    - Species †P. armstrongi Johnston & Fox, 1984
    - Species? †P. corystes Scott, 2003
    - Species? †P. foxi Storer, 1991
    - Species †P. laytoni Jepsen, 1940
    - Species †P. lunatus Krause, 1982 [P. childei Kühne, 1969]
    - Species †P. simpsoni Jepsen, 1940
    - Species †P. sinclairi Simpson, 1935
    - Species †P. sloani Schiebout, 1974
    - Species †P. trovessartianus Cope, 1882
    - Species †P. sylviae Rigsby, 1980 [Ectypodus sylviae Rigby, 1980]
    - Species? †P. vanvaleni Sloan, 1981
  - Genus †Cernaysia Vianey-Liaud, 1986
    - Species †C. manueli Vianey-Liaud, 1986
    - Species †C. davidi Vianey-Liaud, 1986
  - Genus †Krauseia Vianey-Liaud, 1986
    - Species †K. clemensi Sloan, 1981 [Parectypodus clemensi Sloan, 1981]
  - Genus †XyronomysRigby, 1980
    - Species †X. swainae Rigby, 1980
  - Genus †Xanclomys Rigby, 1980
    - Species †X. mcgrewiRigby, 1980
  - Genus †MesodmopsTong & Wang, 1994
    - Species †M. dawsonae Tong & Wang, 1994
- Family †Ptilodontidae Cope, 1887 [Ptilodontinae Cope, 1887 sensu McKenna & Bell, 1997]
  - Genus †Kimbetohia Simpson, 1936
    - Species †K. cambi [Simpson, 1936]
    - Species †K. mziae [Middleton and Dewar, 2004]
  - Genus †Ptilodus Cope, 1881 [Chirox Cope, 1884]
    - Species? †P. fractus
    - Species †P. kummae Krause, 1977
    - Species †P. gnomus Scott, Fox & Youzwyshyn, 2002
    - Species †P. mediaevus Cope, 1881 [Ptilodus plicatus (Cope, 1884); Chirox plicatus Cope, 1884 P. ferronensis Gazin, 1941]
    - Species †P. montanus Douglass, 1908 [P. gracilis Gidley, 1909; P. admiralis Hay, 1930]
    - Species †P. tsosiensis Sloan, 1981
    - Species †P. wyomingensis Jepsen, 1940
  - Genus †Baiotomeus Krause, 1987
    - Species †B. douglassi Simpson, 1935 [Mimetodon]
    - Species †B. lamberti Krause, 1987
    - Species †B. russelli Scott, Fox & Youzwyshyn, 2002
    - Species †B. rhothonion Scott, 2003
  - Genus †Prochetodon Jepsen, 1940
    - Species †P. cavus Jespen, 1940
    - Species †P. foxi Krause, 1987
    - Species †P. taxus Krause, 1987
    - Species †P. speirsae Scott, 2004
- Family †Kogaionidae Rãdulescu & Samson, 1996
  - Genus †Kogaionon Rãdulescu & Samson, 1996
    - Species †K. ungureanui Rãdulescu & Samson, 1996
  - Genus †Hainina Vianey-Liaud, 1979
    - Species †H. belgica Vianey-Liaud, 1979
    - Species †H. godfriauxi Vianey-Liaud, 1979
    - Species †H. pyrenaica Peláez-Campomanes, López-Martínez, Álvarez-Sierra & Daams, 2000
    - Species †H. vianeyae Peláez-Campomanes, López-Martínez, Álvarez-Sierra & Daams, 2000
  - Genus †Barbatodon Rãdulescu & Samson, 1986
    - Species †B. transylvanicum Rãdulescu & Samson, 1986
- Family †Eucosmodontidae Jepsen, 1940 sensu Kielan-Jaworowska & Hurum, 2001 [Eucosmodontidae: Eucosmodontinae Jepsen, 1940 sensu McKenna & Bell, 1997]
  - Genus †ClemensodonKrause, 1992
    - Species †C. megaloba Krause, 1992 [Kimbetohia cambi, in partim]
  - Genus †Eucosmodon Matthew & Granger, 1921
    - Species †E. primus [Granger & Simpson, 1929 or Sloan, 1981]
    - Species †E. americanus Cope, 1885
    - Species †E. molestus Cope, 1869 (1886?) [Neoplagiaulax molestus Cope, 1869]
  - Genus †Stygimys Sloan & Van Valen, 1965
    - Species †S. camptorhiza Johnston & Fox, 1984
    - Species †S. cupressus Fox, 1981
    - Species †S. kuszmauli [Eucosmodon kuszmauli]
    - Species †S. jepseni Simpson, 1935
    - Species †S. teilhardi Granger & Simpson, 1929
- Family †Microcosmodontidae Holtzman & Wolberg, 1977 [Eucosmodontidae: Microcosmodontinae Holtzman & Wolberg, 1977 sensu McKenna & Bell, 1997]
  - Genus †PentacosmodonJepsen, 1940
    - Species †P. pronus Jepsen, 1940 [Djadochtatheroid? (Kielan-Jaworowska & Hurum, 2001)]
  - Genus †Acheronodon Archibald, 1982
    - Species †A. garbani Archibald, 1982
  - Genus †Microcosmodon Jepsen, 1930
    - Species †M. conus Jepsen, 1930
    - Species †M. rosei Krause, 1980
    - Species †M. arcuatus Johnston & Fox, 1984
    - Species †M. woodi Holtzman & Wolberg, 1977 [Eucosmodontine?]
    - Species †M. harleyi Weil, 1998

Superfamily †Djadochtatherioidea Kielan-Jaworowska & Hurum, 1997 sensu Kielan-Jaworowska & Hurum, 2001[Djadochtatheria Kielan-Jaworowska & Hurum, 1997]

- Genus? †BulganbaatarKielan-Jaworowska, 1974
  - Species? †B. nemegtbaataroides Kielan-Jaworowska, 1974
- Genus? †Chulsanbaatar Kielan-Jaworowska, 1974
  - Species? †C. vulgaris Kielan-Jaworowska, 1974 Chulsanbaataridae Kielan-Jaworowska, 1974
- Genus †Nemegtbaatar Kielan-Jaworowska, 1974
  - Species? †N. gobiensis Kielan-Jaworowska, 1974
- Family †Sloanbaataridae Kielan-Jaworowska, 1974
  - Genus †Kamptobaatar Kielan-Jaworowska, 1970
    - Species? †K. kuczynskii Kielan-Jaworowska, 1970
  - Genus †Nessovbaatar Kielan-Jaworowska & Hurum, 1997
    - Species †N. multicostatus Kielan-Jaworowska & Hurum, 1997
  - Genus †Sloanbaatar Kielan-Jaworowska, 1974
    - Species †S. mirabilis Kielan-Jaworowska, 1974 [Sloanbaatarinae]
- Family †Djadochtatheriidae Kielan-Jaworowska $ Hurum, 1997
  - Genus †DjadochtatheriumSimpson, 1925
    - Species †D. matthewi Simpson, 1925[Catopsalis matthewi Simpson, 1925]
  - Genus †Catopsbaatar Kielan-Jaworowska, 1974
    - Species †C. catopsaloides (Kielan-Jaworowska, 1974) Kielan-Jaworowska, 1994 [Djadochtatherium catopsaloides Kielan-Jaworowska, 1974]
  - Genus †Tombaatar Kielan-Jaworowska, 1974
    - Species †T. sabuli Rougier, Novacek & Dashzeveg, 1997
  - Genus †Kryptobaatar Kielan-Jaworowska, 1970 [Gobibaatar Kielan-Jaworowska, 1970, Tugrigbaatar Kielan-Jaworowska & Dashzeveg, 1978]
    - Species †K. saichanensis Kielan-Jaworowska & Dashzeveg, 1978 [Tugrigbaatar saichaenensis Kielan-Jaworowska & Dashzeveg, 1978]
    - Species †K. dashzevegi Kielan-Jaworowska, 1970
    - Species †K. mandahuensis Smith, Guo & Sun, 2001
    - Species †K. gobiensis Kielan-Jaworowska, 1970 [Gobibaatar parvus Kielan-Jaworowska, 1970 ]

Superfamily †Taeniolabidoidea Granger & Simpson, 1929 sensu Kielan-Jaworowska & Hurum, 2001

- Genus †Prionessus Matthew & Granger, 1925
  - Species †P. lucifer Matthew & Granger, 1925
- Family †Lambdopsalidae
  - Genus †Lambdopsalis Chow & Qi, 1978
    - Species †L. bulla Chow & Qi, 1978
  - Genus †Sphenopsalis Matthew, Granger & Simpson, 1928
    - Species †S. nobilis Matthew, Granger & Simpson, 1928
- Family †Taeniolabididae Granger & Simpson, 1929
  - Genus †Taeniolabis Cope, 1882
    - Species †T. lamberti Simmons, 1987
    - Species †T. taoensis Cope, 1882
  - Genus †Kimbetopsalis
    - Species †K. simmonsae
