= Coalspur Formation =

Stratigraphic unit of the Western Canada Sedimentary Basin

- Stratigraphic range: Maastrichtian to Danian
- Type: Formation
- Unit of: Saunders Group
- Sub-units: Coalspur coal zone, Entrance conglomerate
- Underlies: Paskapoo Formation
- Overlies: Brazeau Formation
- Thickness: Up to about 550 metres (1,800 ft)

Lithology
- Primary: Sandstone, siltstone, shale
- Other: Coal, conglomerate, bentonite

Location
- Coordinates: 53.0°N 116.8°W
- Approximate paleocoordinates: 60.6°N 91.6°W
- Region: Alberta
- Country: Canada
- Extent: Western Canada Sedimentary Basin

Type section
- Named for: Coalspur, Alberta
- Named by: B.R. MacKay
- Year defined: 1949
- Coalspur Formation (Canada) Coalspur Formation (Alberta)

The Coalspur Formation is an Upper Cretaceous to lower Palaeocene stratigraphic unit of the Western Canada Sedimentary Basin in the foothills of southwestern Alberta. Its deposition spanned the time interval from latest Cretaceous (Maastrichtian) to early Palaeocene, and it includes sediments that were deposited before, during, and after the Cretaceous-Paleogene (K-Pg) extinction event. It includes the economically important coal deposits of the Coalspur Coal Zone, as well as nonmarine plant and animal fossils.

== Geology ==
=== Lithology ===
The sediments of the Coalspur Formation were eroded from the Canadian Cordillera, and were transported eastward by river systems and deposited in fluvial channel and floodplain environments. The formation consists primarily of sandstones and siltstones, interbedded with mudstones and minor amounts of bentonite. Thick coal seams are present locally in the upper portion of the formation, especially in the Alberta Coal Branch area southeast of Hinton, Alberta. Near the Athabasca River the base consists primarily of conglomerate and is known as the Entrance Conglomerate.

=== Stratigraphy and age ===
The Coalspur Formation is part of the Saunders group. The K-Pg boundary has been identified within the formation at the base of the lowermost coal seam (the Mynheer seam), based on changes in the fossil pollen assemblage and the presence of an iridium anomaly. The boundary subdivides the Coalspur Formation into an upper member called the Coalspur coal zone which is of early Paleocene age, and an unnamed lower member of latest Cretaceous age.

=== Thickness and distribution ===
The Coalspur Formation is present in the Alberta foothills from south of the Wapiti River to the North Saskatchewan River. The formation is estimated to reach thicknesses of up to about 550 metres (1,800 ft), and the Coalspur coal zone is about 120 metres (390 ft) to 200 metres (660 ft) thick.

=== Relationship to other units ===
The Coalspur Formation rests abruptly on the Brazeau Formation and is overlain abruptly by the Paskapoo Formation. It is equivalent to the Scollard Formation of the west-central Alberta plains, the Willow Creek Formation in the southwestern plains, and part or all of the Ravenscrag Formation in Saskatchewan. The base of the Coalspur coal zone is equivalent to the base of the Ardley coal zone, which is also floored on the K-Pg boundary bed.

== Paleobiota ==
Plant fossils and mammal remains have been described from the Coalspur Formation, but although the lower part of the formation is of Late Cretaceous age, no dinosaur remains have yet been reported. The best vertebrate fossils of the Coalspur Formation are from a railroad cut near the locality of Diss. This site may be from the Torrejonian 3 North American Land Mammal Age (NALMA).

=== Amphibia ===
Amphibians of the Duchesne River Formation
Genus / Taxon	Species	Notes	Images
Opisthotriton	O. kayi	A batrachosauroidid salamander	

=== Mammalia ===
Unnamed "lipotyphlan" and "creodont" fossils have also been reported from the formation.

==== Carnivoramorpha ====
Carnivoramorphs of the Duchesne River Formation
Genus / Taxon	Species	Notes	Images
Simpsonictis	S. jaynanneae	A viverravid	

==== "Condylarthra" ====
"Condylarths" (archaic ungulates) of the Duchesne River Formation
Genus / Taxon	Species	Notes	Images
Colpoclaenus	C. sp.	An arctocyonid	
Promioclaenus	P. sp.	A hyopsodontid	

==== Euarchonta ====
Euarchontans of the Duchesne River Formation
Genus / Taxon	Species	Notes	Images
Palaechthon	P. sp.	A palaechthonid plesiadapiform	

==== Multituberculata ====
Multituberculates of the Duchesne River Formation
Genus / Taxon	Species	Notes	Images
Baiotomeus	B. sp.	A ptilodontid	
Mimetodon	M. sp.	A neoplagiaulacid	
Neoplagiaulax	N. nanophus	A neoplagiaulacid	
Neoplagiaulax	N. cf. nelsoni	A neoplagiaulacid	
Parectypodus	P. corystes	A neoplagiaulacid	
Ptilodus	P. sp.	A ptilodontid	

==== Palaeoryctida ====
Palaeoryctids of the Duchesne River Formation
Genus / Taxon	Species	Notes	Images
Pararyctes	P. sp.	A palaeoryctid	

==== Pantolesta ====
Pantolestans of the Duchesne River Formation
Genus / Taxon	Species	Notes	Images
Aphronorus	A. sp.	A pentacodontid	
Propalaeosinopa	P. sp.	A pantolestid	

== Resources ==
The Coalspur Formation includes seven major seams that range up to 22 metres (72 ft) in thickness. The coal is of sub-bituminous B to C rank, with a low sulphur content. It is mined in the Alberta Coal Branch area and shipped to electric power generating stations in Canada and abroad.

== See also ==
- List of fossiliferous stratigraphic units in Alberta
- Edmonton Group
- Hell Creek Formation
- Coal in Alberta
