= Naturita Formation =

Geologic formation in Colorado and Utah, U.S.

- Stratigraphic range: Cenomanian; ~99–94 Ma
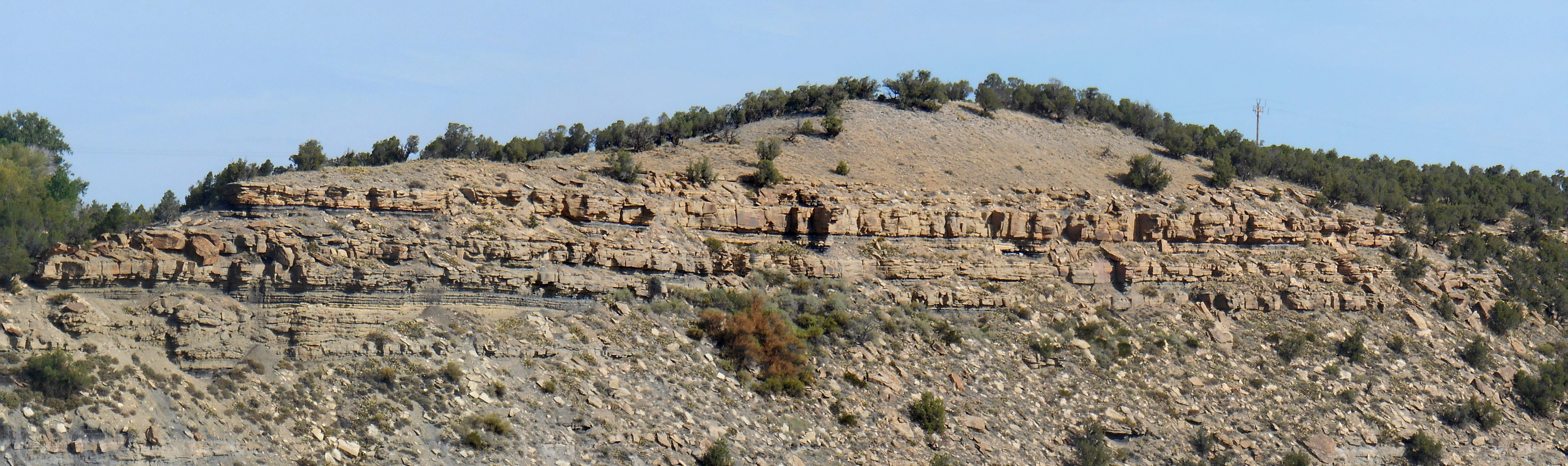
- Type locality for the Naturita Formation above the former Nucla coal power plant, Naturita, Colorado
- Type: Geological formation
- Sub-units: Culver Coal Zone member
- Underlies: Mancos Shale
- Overlies: Cedar Mountain & Burro Canyon Formations

Lithology
- Primary: Mudstone
- Other: Shale, sandstone

Location
- Coordinates: 37.6°N 112.9°W
- Approximate paleocoordinates: 39.4°N 75.5°W
- Region: Colorado, Utah
- Country: United States

Type section
- Named for: Naturita, Colorado
- Naturita Formation (the United States) Naturita Formation (Utah)

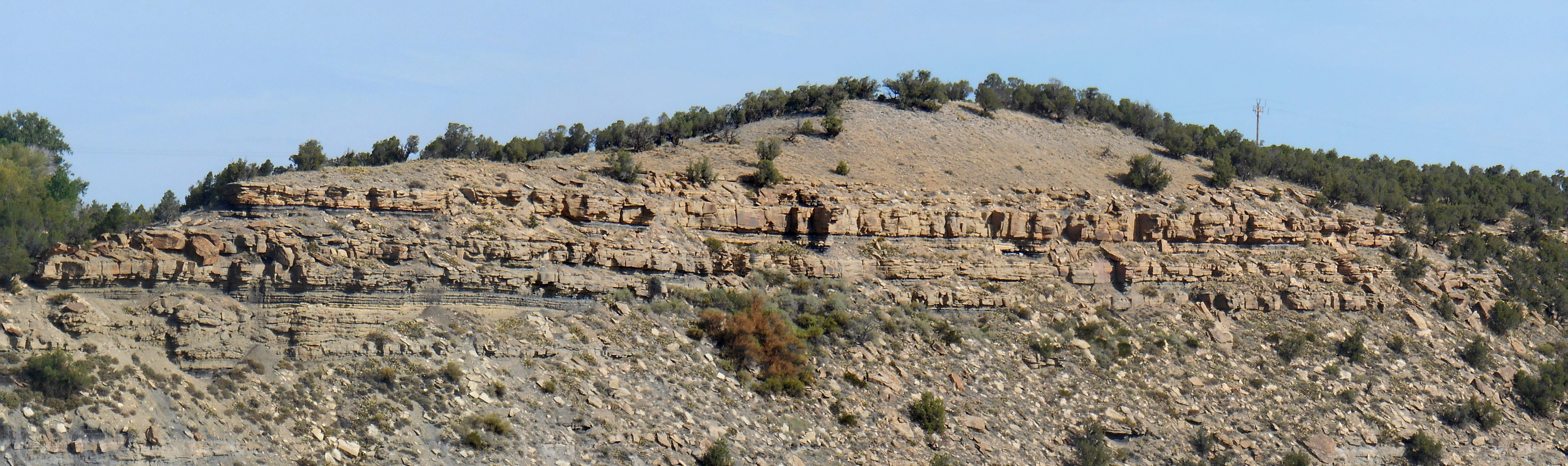
Type locality for the Naturita Formation above the former Nucla coal power plant, Naturita, Colorado.

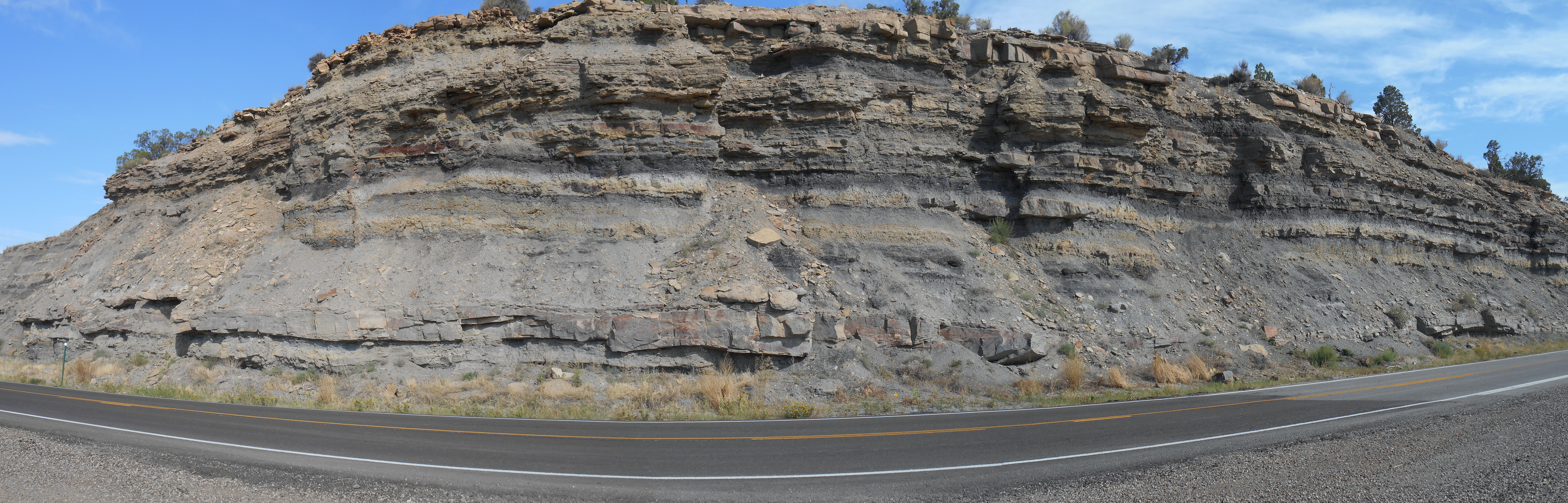
Naturita Formation exposed in a road cut near the type locality, Naturita, Colorado.

The Naturita Formation is a classification used in western Colorado and eastern Utah for a Cretaceous Period sedimentary geologic formation. This name was "applied to the upper or carbonaceous part of Dakota Group" by R.G. Young in 1960, naming it for Naturita, Colorado. The name is not used by U.S. Geological Survey authors, but has found growing acceptance by the Utah Geological Survey

== History of the name ==
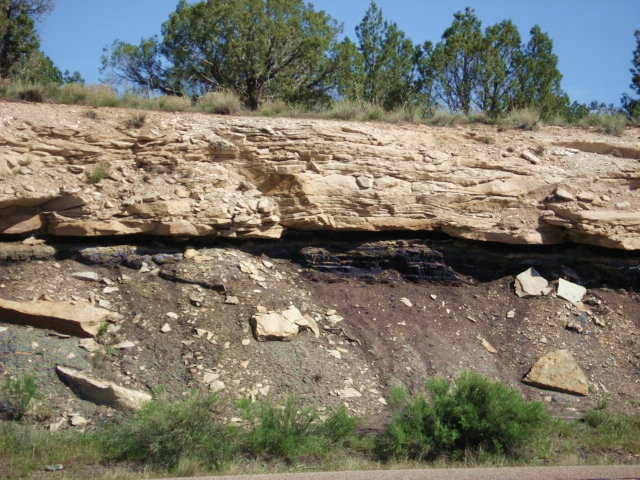
Naturita Formation exposed in a roadcut in eastern Utah. A coal seam is visible below its sandstone bed, with a thin volcanic ash (white) layer in its upper portion.

The formation in Utah and western Colorado overlies the Cedar Mountain and Burro Canyon Formations, and underlies the Mancos Shale formation, thus occupying a similar position of sedimentary strata that have widely been called Dakota Formation in Iowa, Kansas and Nebraska.

The use of the name "Dakota" in western states was the result of early geological mapping by F.V. Hayden beginning in the 1850. For convenience, he maintained the same terminology developed during the early mapping along the Missouri River as he began mapping farther west in the 1860s even while acknowledging "There are very few points of resemblance between these beds and those which form the Dakota group, as seen in Kansas and Nebraska. All the evidence therefore that I have had to guide me in regard to these beds along the margin of the mountain ranges has been their position." (p. 114). Despite this doubt by Hayden, the name Dakota Formation became entrenched in many western states, but has been renamed as the Lakota Formation in South Dakota, the Cloverly Formation in Wyoming and Montana (in part), and the South Platte Formation in eastern Colorado, but not on the northern half of the Colorado Plateau where the name "Dakota Formation" continued to be used.

In 1960, Young who was investigating uranium ore deposits on the Colorado Plateau for the U.S. Atomic Energy Commission, proposed the name Naturita Formation for the town of Naturita, Colorado. Although he described the general character of the formation, he did not designate a type section until five years later. The proposed name change was ignored by most geologists, probably because Young did not elaborate why he was proposing a name change. Years later, Witzke and Ludvigson independently noted a problem with the use of the name "Dakota Formation" in western states, writing "Usage of the term 'Dakota' for western-derived sedimentary sequences in the Rocky Mountain area is discouraged.". This, too was largely ignored until Carpenter made a detailed case for accepting "Naturita Formation" on the Colorado Plateau. After a detailed review of the history of the problem, Carpenter argued 1) that during their deposition, the Dakota Formation and the Naturita Formation were separated by the Western Interior Cretaceous Seaway, 2) stream depositing the Dakota and Naturita Formations were flowing towards each other on opposite sides of the Seaway, but the formations did not connect one side of the seaway to the other, and 3) sediments of the Dakota Formation on the east side of the Seaway were derived from the North American Craton, whereas sediments of the Naturita Formation were derived from the Sevier uplift along the Nevada-Utah border. Thus, the two formations were derived independent of each other.

== Geology ==
The formation is described as having a lower section that is dark-brown to black, carbonaceous claystone, gray shale, and siltstone, and some beds of gray-orange to white coarse-grained sandstone which may form ledges; a middle section of mostly thin, but locally thick coal beds; and an upper section that is gray-orange to light brown, moderately erosion resistant, locally fossiliferous sandstone that is interbedded with light-olive-gray shale. Locally, a channel conglomerate is present at the base. Where missing, a lag of conglomerate may be present indicating winnowing of sediments, which occurred by advancing Cretaceous seas. In other places, deposition of Naturita sediments did not occur, and these areas may have been quiet lagoons because oyster shells are often present in great abundance.

The lower portion of the Naturita Formation represents river channel and floodplain deposits, whereas the upper part represent a complex of estuarine, lagoonal, and swamp environments of a coastal plain.

Ludvigson and Witzke, correlated the Dakota Formation in Iowa with the "Dakota" along the Colorado Front Range based on palynostratigraphy and recognized those palynostratigraphic sequences throughout the Western Interior. In 2012, the Dakota/Naturita Formation sequence and fossil pollen species in Utah were correlated with the Ludvigson and Witzke report on the Dakota at the Nebraska type location.

Radiometric dates and fossil invertebrates show that the Naturita Formation becomes progressively younger southwards and westwards across Utah, thus recording the advancing Western Interior Seaway.

=== Fossil content ===
==== Plants ====
A low diversity flora assemblage has been described from Utah consisting of horsetails, ferns and angiosperms. Many of the identifications are dated and a new study may increase the diversity.

Equisetum

Asplenium

Coniopteris

Hausmannia

Gleichenia

Matonidium

Astralopteris

Cladophlebis

Ilex

Magnolia

Ficus

Eucalyptus

Platanus

Salix

==== Vertebrates ====
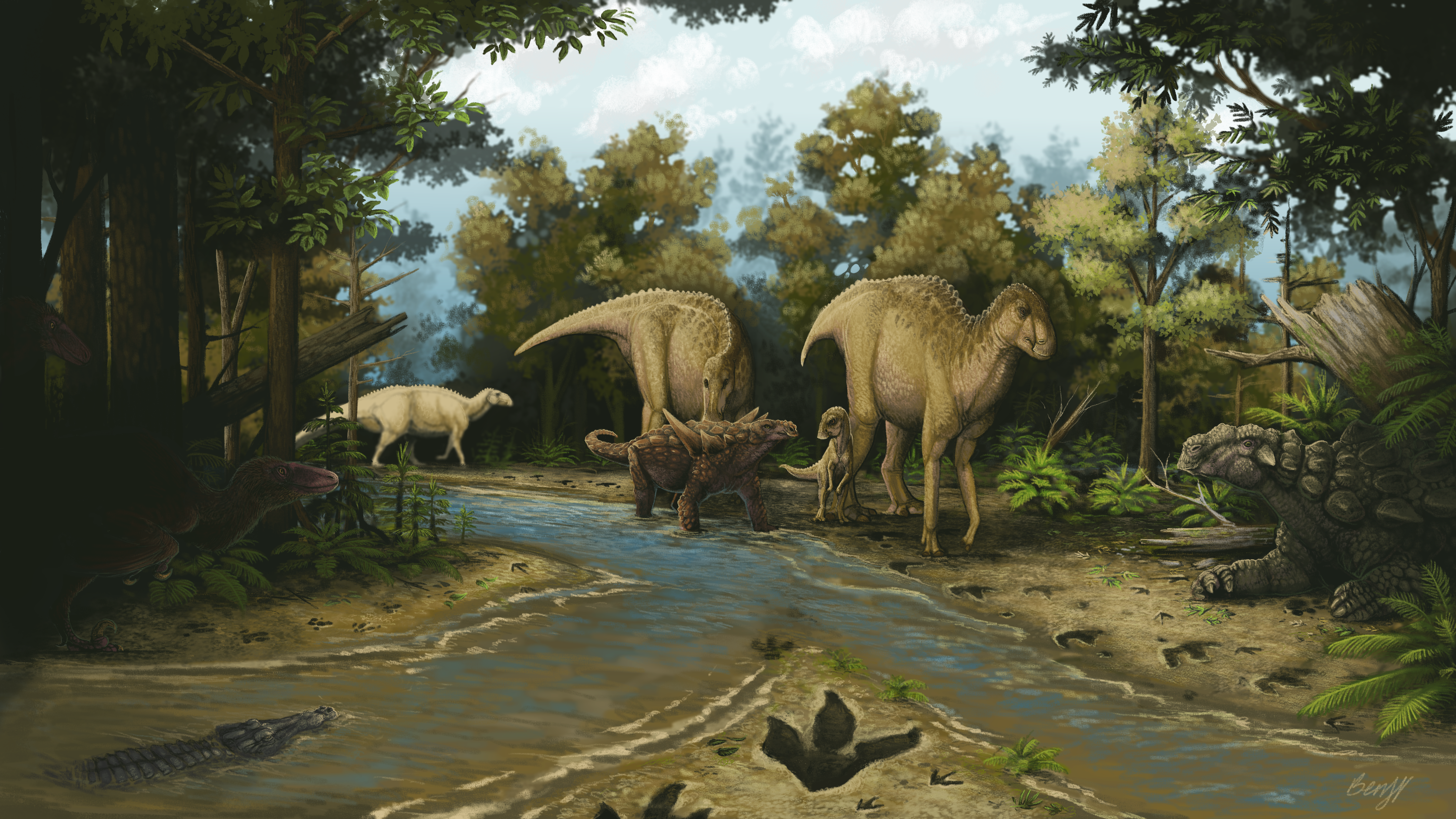
Life restoration of the types of animals identified from the formation

Fossi vertebrates include dinosaur bone fragments of ceratopsians, a possible primitive tyrannosaurid, nodosaurid ankylosaurs, a brachiosaurid sauropod, the bothremyid turtle Paiutemys. and fossil mammals

===== Mammals =====
- Cedaromys minimus
- Cimolodon cf. similis
- Dakotadens morrowi
- Dakotamys malcolmi
- Eoalphadon clemensi
- E. lillegraveni
- E. woodburnei
- Paracimexomys cf. robisoni
- Pariadens kirklandi
- Varalphadon janetae
- Alphadon sp.
- Bryceomys sp.
- Dakotadens sp.
- Eoalphadon sp.
- Paracimexomys sp.
- Protalphadon sp.

== See also ==
- List of fossiliferous stratigraphic units in Colorado
- List of fossiliferous stratigraphic units in Utah
- Paleontology in Colorado
- Paleontology in Utah
- List of dinosaur bearing rock formations
