= Straight Cliffs Formation =

Geologic formation in south central Utah, USA

- Stratigraphic range: Turonian-Campanian; ~92–81 Ma
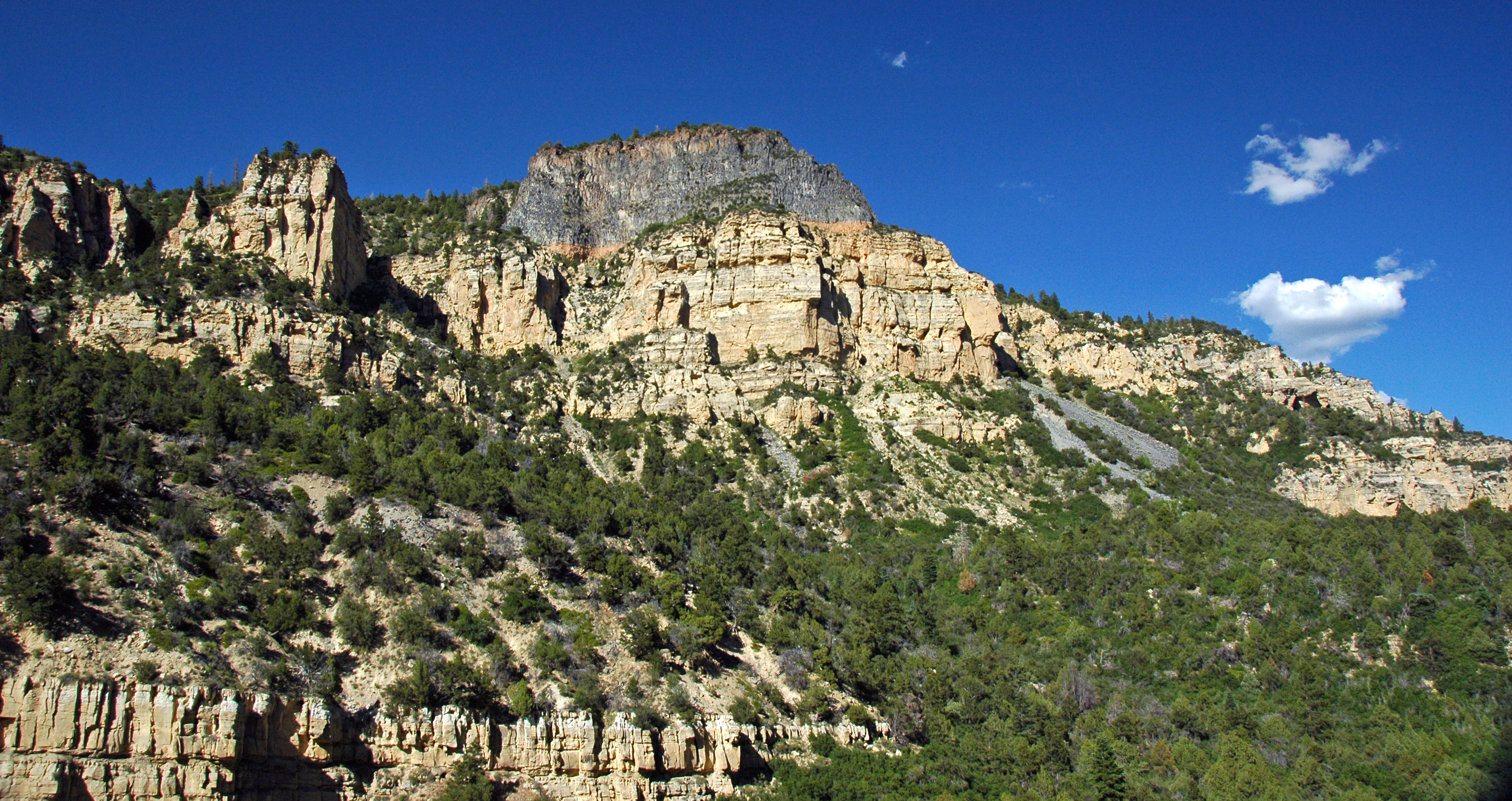
- Cedar Canyon Basalt over Straight Cliffs Formation (Iron County, Utah)
- Type: Geological formation
- Underlies: Wahweap Formation
- Overlies: Tropic Shale
- Thickness: Max. 750 m (2,460 ft)

Lithology
- Primary: Sandstone
- Other: Siltstone, mudstone, coal, conglomerate

Location
- Region: South central Utah
- Country: United States
- Extent: 3,600 km^{2} (1,400 sq mi)

Type section
- Named for: Straight Cliffs
- Named by: Gregory and Moore
- Year defined: 1931

The Straight Cliffs Formation is a stratigraphic unit in the Kaiparowits Plateau of south central Utah. It is Late Cretaceous (latest Turonian – early Campanian) in age and contains fluvial (river systems), paralic (swamps and lagoons), and marginal marine (shoreline) siliciclastic strata. It is well exposed around the margin of the Kaiparowits Plateau in the Grand Staircase – Escalante National Monument in south central Utah. The formation is named after the Straight Cliffs, a long band of cliffs creating the topographic feature Fiftymile Mountain.

The Straight Cliffs Formation was deposited in a marginal marine basin system along the western edge of the Cretaceous Western Interior Seaway. It is bounded below by the Tropic Shale and above by the Wahweap Formation. A variety of fossil species have been found within the Straight Cliffs including ammonites, mollusks, foraminifera, ostracods, sharks, fish, amphibians, turtles, lizards, crocodyliforms, dinosaurs, and mammals.

== Geology ==
The Straight Cliffs Formation overlies the Cenomanian-Turonian Tropic Shale Formation and underlies the Campanian Wahweap Formation. It preserves fluvial and marginal marine strata from the Kaiparowits Basin of the Cretaceous Western Interior Seaway. The formation is primarily composed of sandstone and has lesser amounts of siltstones, mudstones, coals, and conglomerates. It is the partial lateral equivalent of the Mancos Shale formation further east. The Straight Cliffs Formation is latest Turonian to early Campanian in age. The stratigraphy of the formation was initially studied for its coal resources and has more recently been studied as an analog for petroleum reservoirs. Consequently, the stratigraphy of the Straight Cliffs has been analyzed in detail.

== Stratigraphy ==
The Straight Cliffs Formation was deposited in the Kaiparowits Basin of the Western Interior Seaway. The basin received sediment from the Mogollon highlands, the Sevier fold-thrust and the Cordilleran volcanic arc. The Mogollon highlands were mountains in central Arizona. The Sevier fold-thrust belt was a mountain range forming to the west of the Kaiparowits while the Cordilleran volcanic arc was further west in California. Although the Straight Cliffs Fm was deposited in an ancient basin it is preserved in a modern physiographic plateau. The Kaiparowits Plateau covers 3,600 km2 and preserves strata located roughly 120 km east of the leading edge of the thrust front at the time of deposition. First analyzed for its coal content, the Straight Cliffs Formation was assessed by Gregory and Moore (1931) and later by Peterson (1969a, 1969b) and Vaninetti (1979). The formation has four members in ascending order, the Tibbet Canyon Member, the Smoky Hollow Member, the John Henry Member and the Drip Tank Member. The lithostratigraphy was first examined by Peterson, who broke the John Henry Member into seven sandstone intervals (A-F) and three coal zones. Shanley and McCabe (1991) outlined sequence boundaries and systems tracts for the plateau based on the facies seen on the southern and eastern sides of the plateau. The formation is thought to represent the final transgression of the Tropic Sea.

Shanley and McCabe (1991) described two major sequence boundaries, which separate the Calico Bed from the underlying shales and the Drip Tank Member from the top of the John Henry Member. In addition they describe two minor sequence boundaries, one within the Tibbet Canyon Member while the other above the A-sandstone within the John Henry Member. Work done by Allen and Johnson (2010a, b, 2011) in the Rogers Canyon area reassessed some of the interpretations made by Shanley and McCabe (1991) and found multiple retrogradationally stacked parasequences creating overall transgressive-regressive cycles.

=== Tibbet Canyon Member ===
The Tibbet Canyon Member consists of shallow- marine, shoreface, and estuarine deposits. It is well exposed in the southwestern and central parts of the Kaiparowits Plateau. The type locality of the Tibbet Canyon Member is near the mouth of Tibbet Canyon. It is about 70–185 ft thick and composed of yellow and gray very fine to medium sandstone. The base of the unit is transitional into the underlying Tropic Shale, and the top of the member is marked by the contact with overlying mudstones and carbonaceous shales of the Smoky Hollow Member. The member is interpreted as beach and shallow marine deposits. As a whole, it is regressive and represents the withdrawal of the Tropic Sea.

=== Smoky Hollow Member ===
The Smoky Hollow Member ranges from coal-bearing coastal plain strata to braided river strata. It is moderately well exposed along the southern margin of the plateau; however, it is often covered along the eastern Straight Cliffs escarpment. The Smoky Hollow is 24 – 331 feet thick and increases in thickness in the northern corner of the plateau. The top of the formation is distinguished by the Calico Bed, a braided fluvial unit, named for its white and orange coloring. The Calico Bed is a useful marker bed as it is present across the Kaiparowits Plateau and is easily distinguished in outcrop. The Smoky Hollow was deposited in non-marine environments, including lagoonal, coastal plain, and fluvial settings.

=== John Henry Member ===
The John Henry Member is the thickest of the four members of the Straight Cliffs. It contains strata that ranges from fluvial to marine. The lithologies seen include gray shales, siltstones, sandstones, carbonaceous shales, occasional coals and shell has beds. It ranges in thickness from 200 – 500 meters. The A – F sandstone intervals have been studied in detail on the eastern margin of the plateau and can be correlated to fluvial units in the southwest and coastal plain coals in the center of the plateau.

=== Drip Tank Member ===
The overlying Drip Tank Member consists of a coarse-grained fluvial facies thought to reflect a braided river environment. The base of the member often creates a bench at the top of the plateau. The upper contact of the Drip Tank grades into the Wahweap Formation creating sloped interval. The Drip Tank is 141 – 523 feet thick and is mainly composed of yellow to brown medium-grained cross stratified sandstone.

== Depositional environment ==
The Straight Cliffs Formation was deposited in a variety of sub- environments that varied through time as the relative sea level of the Western Interior Seaway changed. The most basal member, the Tibbet Canyon, was deposited on the edge of the Greenhorn Seaway. The Tibbet Canyon preserves the shoreface sands deposited as the shoreline built out into the basin and the seaway retreated. The Smoky Hollow Member preserves fluvial and lagoonal deposits. It was deposited at a time when sea level was relatively low and the shoreline was east of the Kaiparowits Plateau.

The John Henry Member records fluctuations in the sea level. It contains interfingered marine and terrestrial deposits. In the southwestern region of the plateau the John Henry Member preserves ancient river systems which were carrying sediment into the basin from the uplifting Mogollon highlands and Sevier fold – thrust belt. On the eastern side of the Kaiparowits Plateau the John Henry Member preserves interfingered marine and coastal deposits. Careful analysis of the stacking patterns within these beds suggests that the seaway was receding during the bottom third of the John Henry Member. Sea level was rising and flooding the land during the middle portion of John Henry Member deposition. Finally, the sea level fell again during the final phase of deposition.

A sequence boundary separates the Drip Tank Member from the underlying John Henry Member. This means that the strata of the uppermost John Henry Member were subaerially exposed and eroded before Drip Tank deposition. After the period of erosion river systems swept over the Kaiparowits Plateau and deposited the braided fluvial sheet deposits sands of the Drip Tank Member.

== Fossil content ==
=== Invertebrate paleofauna ===
The most diverse and abundant fossils found in the Straight Cliffs Formation are invertebrate fauna. The fauna observed include oysters, ammonites, inoceramids, bivalves, ostracods and foraminifera. Oysters are one of the most common invertebrate fossils found in the Straight Cliffs Formation and are often preserved in large shell hash beds in marginal marine parts of the section. Only the Tibbet Canyon and John Henry members are known to contain marine invertebrate fauna because the Smoky Hollow and Drip Tank Member were deposited in terrestrial settings. The Tibbet Canyon Member was initially dated based a middle Turonian index fossil Inoceramus howelli which indicates the Prionocyclus hyatti ammonite zone. A variety of invertebrate fossils have been found in the John Henry Member including the ammonite Baculites codyensis and the bivalve Endocostea baltica. Analysis of foraminifera and ostracods has helped refine depositional environment interpretations for a variety of shallow marine sub-environments such as lagoons, bays, and estuaries

Group	Genus	Species	Stratigraphic	Source
Pelecypoda	Inoceramus	I.howelli White	Tibbet Canyon Member	Peterson, 1969
Pelecypoda	Inoceramus	I. balticus	John Henry Member	Peterson, 1969
Pelecypoda	Inoceramus	sp.	Tibbet Canyon Member, John Henry Member	Peterson, 1969
Pelecypoda	Inoceramus	I. Mesabiensis (Berquist)	John Henry Member	Peterson, 1969
Pelecypoda	Ostrea	sp.	Tibbet Canyon Member	Peterson, 1969
Pelecypoda	Ostrea	O. congesta Conrad	John Henry Member	Peterson, 1969
Pelecypoda	Crassostrea	C. soleniscus (Meek)	Tibbet Canyon Member, John Henry Member	Peterson, 1969
Pelecypoda	Crassostrea	C. coalvillensis (Meek)	John Henry Member	Peterson, 1969
Pelecypoda	Brachidontes	sp.	Tibbet Canyon Member, John Henry Member	Peterson, 1969
Pelecypoda	Cardium cf.	C. pauperculum Meek	Tibbet Canyon Member	Peterson, 1969
Pelecypoda	Legumen cf.	L. ellipticum Conrad	Tibbet Canyon Member	Peterson, 1969
Gastropoda	Gyrodes	G. conradi Meek	Tibbet Canyon Member	Peterson, 1969
Gastropoda	Gyrodes	G. depressus Meek	Example	Peterson, 1969
Gastropoda	Cryptorhytis	C. utahensis (Meek)	Tibbet Canyon Member	Peterson, 1969
Cephalopoda	Heterotissotia	sp.	Tibbet Canyon Member	Peterson, 1969
Cephalopoda	Baculites	B. asper Morton	John Henry Member	Peterson, 1969
Cephalopoda	Baculites	B. codyensis	John Henry Member	Peterson, 1969
Cephalopoda	Protexanites	P. shoshonensis (Meek)	John Henry Member	Peterson, 1969
Cephalopoda	Placenticeras	sp.	John Henry Member	Peterson, 1969
Cephalopoda	Scaphites	sp.	John Henry Member	Peterson, 1969
Annelida	Serpula cf.	S. tenuicarinata	John Henry Member	Peterson, 1969

=== Vertebrate paleofauna ===
Vertebrate fossils have been found throughout the Straight Cliffs Formation. The fossils from the Straight Cliffs Formation document a diverse assemblage of therian mammals. The Tibbet Canyon Member contains sharks’ teeth from marine deposits rare mammal fossils from deltaic deposits. Recovered fossils include sharks, rays, lepisosteid fishes, crocodyliforms, and fragmentary marsupial mammal teeth. The Smoky Hollow Member also contains a variety of sharks, amphibians, reptiles, snakes, crocodyliforms, and dinosaurs. The member also contains multituberculate and marsupial mammals. The John Henry Member contains more brackish and marine fauna, as well as mammals and other terrestrial species which are less common. The Drip Tank Member is primarily fluvial and consequently only water worn fragments of turtle and crocodyliforms have been recovered.

Group	Genus	Species	Stratigraphic Position	Material	Source
Chondrichthyes	Scapanorhynchus	S. raphiodon (Agassiz)	Tibbet Canyon Member		Peterson, 1969
Chondrichthyes	Lamna	L. appendiculata Agassiz	John Henry Member		Peterson, 1969
Chondrichthyes	Chiloscyllium	C. grenni	Tibbet Canyon Member		Eaton et al., 1999
Chondrichthyes	Squalicorax	S. falcatus	Tibbet Canyon Member		Eaton et al., 1999
Chondrichthyes	Cretodus	C. semiplicatus	Tibbet Canyon Member		Eaton et al., 1999 (wrongly attributed to "Ceratodus semiplicatus")
Chondrichthyes	Phychodus	sp.	John Henry Member		Peterson, 1969
Chondrichthyes	Lissodus	sp.	John Henry Member		Eaton et al., 1999
Chondrichthyes	Hybodus	sp.	John Henry Member		Eaton et al., 1999
Chondrichthyes	Ptychodus	P. mortoni Agassiz, 1843	John Henry Member		Eaton et al., 1999
Chondrichthyes	Undifferentiated		John Henry Member	Teeth fragments	Peterson, 1969
Osteichthyes	Lepisosteus	sp.	John Henry Member		Eaton et al., 1999
Osteichthyes	Atractosteus	sp.	John Henry Member		Eaton et al., 1999
Urodela	Albanerpeton	sp.	John Henry Member		Eaton et al., 1999
Testudines	Adocus	sp.	John Henry Member		Eaton et al., 1999
Testudines	Aspideretes	sp.	John Henry Member		Eaton et al., 1999
Testudines	Basilemys	sp.	John Henry Member		Eaton et al., 1999
Testudines	Naomichelys	sp.	John Henry Member		Eaton et al., 1999
Squamata	Odaxosaurus	O. piger (Gilmore, 1928)	John Henry Member		Eaton et al., 1999
Crocodylia	Bernissartia	sp.	John Henry Member		Eaton et al., 1999
Crocodylia	Mesoeucrocodylia				Irmis et al., 2013
Crocodylia	Neosuchia				Irmis et al., 2013
Testudines	Undifferentiated		John Henry Member	Carapace fragments	Eaton et al., 1999
Multituberculata	Cimolodon	C. foxi	John Henry Member		
Multituberculata	Cimolodon	C. similis	John Henry Member		Eaton, 2013
Multituberculata	Paracimexomys	sp.	John Henry Member, Smoky Hollow Member		Eaton et al., 1999
Multituberculata	Symmetrodontoides	S. oligodontos	Smoky Hollow Member		Cefelli, 1990
Multituberculata	Symmetrodontoides	S. mckennai	Smoky Hollow Member		Cefelli, 1990
Multituberculata	Cedaromys	sp.	Tibbet Canyon Member, John Henry Member		Eaton, 2006
Multituberculata	Mesodma	sp.	John Henry Member		Eaton, 2013
Multituberculata	Dakotamys	D. shakespeari	John Henry Member		Eaton, 2013
Multituberculata	Bryceomys	B. fumosus	Smoky Hollow Member		Eaton, 1995
Multituberculata	Bryceomys	B. hadrosus	Smoky Hollow Member		Eaton, 1995
Marsupialia	Spalacotheridium	sp.	John Henry Member		Cifelli, 1990
Marsupialia	Family Peradectidae	Indet.	John Henry Member		Eaton et al., 1999
Marsupialia	Family Stagodontidae	Indet.	John Henry Member		Eaton et al., 1999
Marsupialia	Alphadon	sp.	John Henry Member		Eaton, 2006
Marsupialia	Apistodon	sp.	John Henry Member		Eaton, 2013
Marsupialia	Varalphadon	sp.	Smoky Hollow Member, John Henry Member		Eaton, 2006
Marsupialia	Eodelphis	sp.	John Henry Member		Cifelli, 1990
Marsupialia	Leptalestes	sp.	John Henry Member		Eaton, 2013
Dinosauria	Richardoestesia	R. gilmorei	John Henry Member		Eaton, 2013
Fish	Diplomystus	sp.	John Henry Member	Teeth	Larson and Currie, 2013
Fish	Lepisosteid	sp.	Smoky Hollow Member, John Henry Member	Teeth fragments	Brinkman et al., 2013
Fish	Micropycnodon	sp.	John Henry Member	Teeth fragments	Brinkman et al., 2013
Fish	Amiidae	sp.	Smoky Hollow Member, John Henry Member		Brinkman et al., 2013
Fish	Melvius	sp.	John Henry Member	Teeth and centra	Brinkman et al., 2013
Fish	Ostariophysa	sp.	John Henry Member	Centra	Brinkman et al., 2013
Fish	Teleost type		Smoky Hollow Member, John Henry Member	Centra	Brinkman et al., 2013
Fish	Acanthopterygian		John Henry Member	Centra	Brinkman et al., 2013
Fish	Hiodontid		Smoky Hollow Member, John Henry Member		Brinkman et al., 2013
Fish	Elopomorph		Smoky Hollow Member, John Henry Member		Brinkman et al., 2013

== See also ==
- List of dinosaur-bearing rock formations
  - List of stratigraphic units with few dinosaur genera
