= Stygimys =

Stygimys Temporal range: Maastrichtian–Paleocene

Scientific classification
- Kingdom: Animalia
- Phylum: Chordata
- Class: Mammalia
- Order: †Multituberculata
- Family: †Eucosmodontidae
- Genus: †Stygimys; Sloan & Van Valen 1965

Species
- S. camptorhiza; S. cupressus; S. jepseni; S. kuszmauli; S. teilhardi

Extinct genus of mammals

Stygimys is an extinct mammal genus from the Upper Cretaceous and Paleocene of North America and Russia. It was a member of the extinct order Multituberculata within the suborder Cimolodonta, family Eucosmodontidae.

The genus Stygimys ("Styx mouse") was named by R.E. Sloan and Leigh Van Valen in 1965. The name comes from the Styx (river of hell) from Greek mythology. The genus has also been known as Catopsalis (partly); Cimexomys (partly); Eucosmodon (partly); and Parectypodus (partly). Some skull material is known, but not much.

== Species ==
The species Stygimys camptorhiza was named by P.A. Johnston and R.C. Fox in 1984. Place: Puercan (Paleocene)-age strata of Rav W-1 in Saskatchewan, Canada. The holotype for this species is in the University of Alberta collection.

The species Stygimys cupressus was named by R.C. Fox in 1989. Remains are known from the Puercan (Paleocene)-age strata of the Long Fall Horizon of Canada.

The species Stygimys jepseni was named by George Gaylord Simpson in 1935 and Sloan and Van Valen in 1965. It is also known as Eucosmodon sparsus (Simpson 1937a); E. jepseni; and Parectypodus jepseni (Simpson 1935d). Remains are known from the Torrejonian (Paleocene)-age strata of Montana (USA). This species has been cited as a descendant of S. kuszmauli. The animal weighed about 90 g.

The species Stygimys kuszmauli was named by R.E. Sloan and Leigh Van Valen in 1965. It has also been known as Catopsalis foliates (Cope 1882); Cimexomys gratus (Jepsen GL, 1930); Eucosmodon gratus (G.L. Jepson 1930); Eucosmodon kuszmauli ; and Stygimys gratus. Remains were found in Maastrichtian (Upper Cretaceous) - Puercan (Paleocene)-age strata of the Polecat Bench Formation of Wyoming, the Hell Creek Formation of Montana and the Udurchukan Formation of Russia. Some scraps of jaw are known. This species is the most basal member of the genus, with a weight of 300 g.

The species Stygimys teilhardi was named by W. Granger & George Gaylord Simpson in 1929 and R.E. Sloan and Leigh Van Valen in 1965. It has also been known as Eucosmodon teilhardi (Granger W. & Simpson G.G. 1929). Remains are known from the Torrejonian (Paleocene)-age strata of the San Juan Basin of New Mexico. This species has been cited as a possible descendant of S. kuszmauli.
