= Neoliotomus =

Scientific classification
- Kingdom: Animalia
- Phylum: Chordata
- Class: Mammalia
- Order: †Multituberculata
- Superfamily: †Ptilodontoidea
- Genus: †Neoliotomus

Species
- N. conventus; N. ultimus

Extinct genus of mammals

Neoliotomus is a genus of North American mammal from the Paleocene. It existed in the age immediately following the extinction of the last dinosaurs and was a member of the extinct order Multituberculata. It lies within the suborder Cimolodonta and the superfamily Ptilodontoidea. Other than that, its affinities are somewhat unclear.

The genus Neoliotomus ("new Liotomus") was named by Jepsen G.L. in 1930, and is also known as Eucosmodon (partly).

== Species ==
The species Neoliotomus conventus, named by Jepsen G.L. in 1930, is known from the Clarkforkian (Paleocene) DeBeque Formation of Wyoming and of the Fort Union Formation of Montana and Colorado, (United States). This is a fairly large multituberculate of around 1.9 kg. The holotype is in the Peabody Museum of Natural History at Yale University.

The species Neoliotomus ultimus was named by Granger W. and Simpson G.G. in 1928. It has also been known as Eucosmodon ultimus (Granger & Simpson, 1928). Fossil remains were found in Clarkforkian (Paleocene) strata of Wyoming and Colorado. This species is known from a fair number of locations. It is another large multituberculate, which weighed perhaps 2 kg.
