= Baiotomeus =

Baiotomeus Temporal range: Paleocene (Torrejonian-Tiffanian) ~65–62 Ma

Scientific classification
- Kingdom: Animalia
- Phylum: Chordata
- Class: Mammalia
- Order: †Multituberculata
- Family: †Ptilodontidae
- Genus: †Baiotomeus

Species
- B. douglassi B. lamberti B. russelli

Extinct family of mammals

Baiotomeus is a genus of mammals from the extinct order of Multituberculata. It is known from the Paleocene of North America.

The genus Baiotomeus was formally named by Krause in 1987 (Krause, 1987), and has also been known as Mimetodon (partly), Neoplagiaulax (partly), and Ptilodus (partly).

== Species ==
=== B. douglassi ===
Baiotomeus douglassi is a fairly substantial multituberculate weighing almost 200 g. Remains have been found in the Fort Union Formation of Montana and Porcupine Hills Formation of Alberta, Canada. The holotype specimen hails from Wyoming in the United States, in strata of the Gidley Quarry dated to the Torrejonian stage of the Paleocene.

The species was originally named Ptilodus douglassi by Simpson in 1935 (Simpson, 1935), but it has been reclassified several times:

- Mimetodon douglassi in 1940, by Jepsen
- Neoplagiaulax douglassi in 1974, by Schiebout

It was finally assigned to Baiotomeus by Hartman in 1986 — which is before Krause formally established the genus in 1987.

=== B. lamberti ===
Remains of Baiotomeus lamberti have been discovered in Montana in the United States, in the Medicine Rocks of the Tongue River Formation, which have been dated to the Paleocene.

Several specimens, including the holotype, are at the Peabody Museum of Natural History at Yale. Collected in 1958 and 1965, these were originally described as belonging to Mimetodon. It was given its current name in 1987 by Krause (Krause, 1987). B. lamberti has also been confused with Ptilodus montanus.

=== B. russelli ===
Baiotomeus russelli has been discovered in Alberta, Canada, in Cochrane 2 of the Paskapoo Formation, which has been dated to the lower Tiffanian stage of the Paleocene.

Remains consist of nine upper premolars, (P4), which average nearly 2.5 mm in length. This is smaller than the teeth of other genus members; from front to back, approximately 45% less than B. douglassi and 40% less than B. lamberti. The rows of cusps also display a strong curvature and the cuspate anterolabial lobe is better developed. There is more variation in the height of the cusps among the middle row. These particular premolars — P4s — have three rows of cusps, of which there seem to be about 15 or so in all. In addition, "the enamel is weakly wrinkled on all specimens". (Scott et al., 2002)

According to the same authors:

At present, P4s are the only specimens from Cochrane 2 that we can identify as pertaining to B. russelli. Although knowledge of this species is limited, we consider its naming to be justified based on the diagnostic morphology of ultimate fourth premolars in ptilodontids generally (Krause 1982, 1987) and the unique structure of these teeth.

The species name honours L. S. Russell "for his pioneering research on the mammals from Cochrane 2". All presently identified remains are part of the collection of the University of Alberta.

Cochrane 2 has also been interpreted as correlating to the Porcupine Hills Formation, but recent studies suggest that it is part of the Paskapoo, as originally concluded by Russell in 1929.
