= Nidimys =

Nidimys occultus Temporal range: Late Cretaceous

Scientific classification
- Domain: Eukaryota
- Kingdom: Animalia
- Phylum: Chordata
- Class: Mammalia
- Order: †Multituberculata
- Family: †Neoplagiaulacidae
- Genus: †Nidimys; Hunter et al., 2010
- Species: †N. occultus

Binomial name
- †Nidimys occultus Hunter et al., 2010

Extinct species of mammal

Nidimys occultus is a multituberculate which existed in the United States during the Edmontonian faunal stage of the upper Cretaceous period, and the only species in the genus Nidimys.
