= Mimetodon =

Mimetodon Temporal range: 61.7–56.8 Ma

Scientific classification
- Kingdom: Animalia
- Phylum: Chordata
- Class: Mammalia
- Order: †Multituberculata
- Family: †Neoplagiaulacidae
- Genus: †Mimetodon

Species
- M. churchilli; M. krausei; ?M. nanophus; M. silberlingi

Extinct genus of mammals

Mimetodon is a small mammal from the Paleocene of North America and perhaps Europe. It was a member of the extinct order Multituberculata within the suborder Cimolodonta and family Neoplagiaulacidae.

The genus Mimetodon was named by Jepsen G.L. in 1940. It has also been known as Ectypodus (partly); Mesodma (partly); Neoplagiaulax (partly). McKenna and Bell (1997) lists possible material from the Upper Paleocene(?) of Europe.

== Species ==
The species Mimetodon churchilli was named by Jepsen G.L. in 1940. Remains were found in the Tiffanian (Middle Paleocene)-age strata of Princeton Quarry in Wyoming (United States). The holotype is in the collection of the Peabody Museum of Natural History at Yale University.

The species Mimetodon krausei was named by Sloan R.E. in 1981. Remains were found in the Puercan (Lower Paleocene)-age strata of the San Juan Basin of New Mexico (United States). This holotype's also in the collection of the Peabody Museum, Yale.

The species ? Mimetodon nanophus was named by Holtzman in 1978. It has also been known as Neoplagiaulax nanophus (Holtzman 1978). Remains were found in the Middle-Upper Paleocene-age strata of the Tongue River Formation in North Dakota (United States). This might be the same as M. silberlingi.

The species Mimetodon silberlingi was named by Simpson G.G. in 1935 and Schiebout in 1974. It has also been known as Ectypodus? silberlingi (Simpson 1935d); Mesodma silberlingi (Van Valen & Sloan 1966); and ?M. nanophus. Remains were found in the Torrejonian-Tiffanian (Middle Paleocene)-age strata in the Gidley Quarry of Montana and in Wyoming, North Dakota and Alberta, Canada. This species weighed an estimated 20 g.
