= Krauseia =

Scientific classification
- Kingdom: Animalia
- Phylum: Chordata
- Class: Mammalia
- Order: †Multituberculata
- Family: †Neoplagiaulacidae
- Genus: †Krauseia; M. Vianey-Liaud, 1986

Species
- K. clemensi

Extinct family of mammals

Krauseia is an extinct genus of small mammal from the Paleocene of North America. It was a member of the extinct order Multituberculata and is within the suborder of Cimolodonta, family Neoplagiaulacidae. The genus was nemed by Vianey-Liaud M. in 1986, and has also partly been known under the name Parectypodus.

The species Krauseia clemensi was named by Sloan R.E. in 1981, and is also known as Parectypodus clemensi. Fossil remains of members of this species have been found in the Torrejonian (Paleocene)-age strata of the San Juan Basin of New Mexico and Wyoming. An approximate weight comparison for P. clemensi is the weight of one standard mouse, around 25 g.
