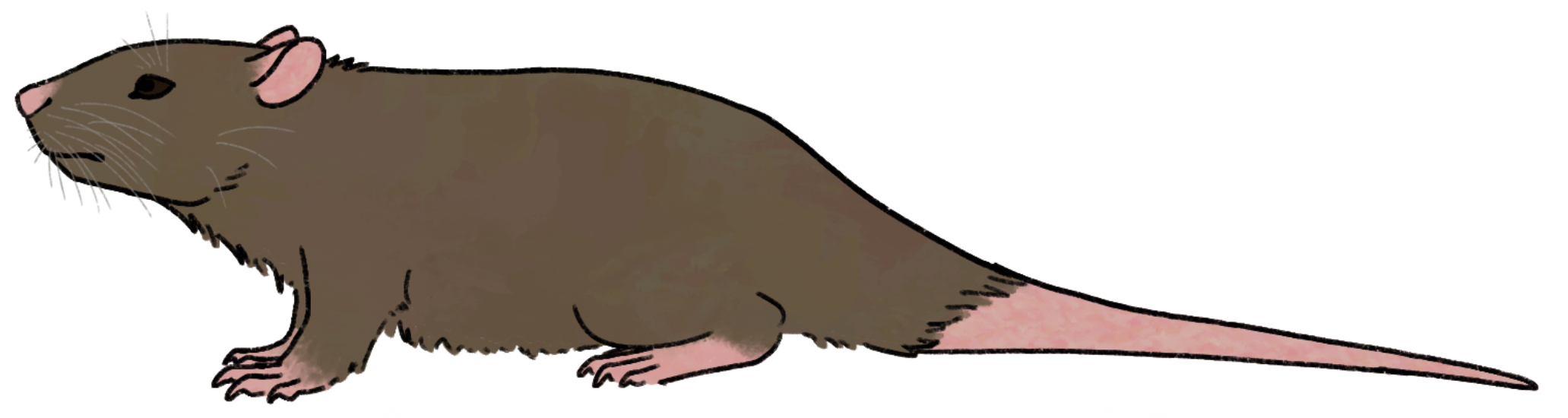
- A hypothetical reconstruction of Hainina based on its relatives.

Scientific classification
- Kingdom: Animalia
- Phylum: Chordata
- Class: Mammalia
- Order: †Multituberculata
- Family: †Kogaionidae
- Genus: †Hainina; Vianey-Liaud, 1979

Type species
- Hainina belgica

Species
- H. belgica; H. cassagnauensis; H. godfriauxi; H. pyrenaica; H. vianeyae

= Hainina =

Hainina Temporal range: Maastrichtian-Thanetian ~66.043–55.8 Ma

Extinct genus of mammals

Hainina is an extinct mammal genus from the latest Cretaceous to the Paleocene of Europe.

== Genus ==
The genus Hainina ("from Hainin") was named by Vianey-Liaud M. in 1979. This genus was originally referred to as Cimolomyidae. "We assign Hainina to the Kogaionidae (superfamily incertae sedis); it differs from Kogaionon in having ornamented enamel, while the enamel is smooth in Kogaionon". Material has also been reported from the Upper Cretaceous of Romania.

== Species ==
Fossils have been described as and found in:

- Species: Hainina belgica Vianey-Liaud M., 1979
  - Place: Paleocene Hainin Formation of Hainin, Belgium
- Species: Hainina cassagnauensis Gheerbrant in Gheerbrant, Allain & Laurent, 2026
  - Place: Late Maastrichtian Marnes d'Auzas Formation of France
- Species: Hainina godfriauxi Vianey-Liaud M., 1979
  - Place: Paleocene of Hainin, Belgium
- Species: Hainina pyrenaica Peláez-Campomanes P., Damms R., López-Martinen N. & Àlvarez-Sierra M. A., 2000
  - Place: Early Paleocene Tremp Formation, in the southern Pyrenees of Spain
- Species: Hainina vianeyae Peláez-Campomanes P., Damms R., López-Martinen N. & Àlvarez-Sierra M. A., 2000
  - Place: Late Paleocene Cernay Formation of Cernay, France
- Hainina sp. - Densus-Ciula Formation, Maastrichtian and Jibou Formation, Thanetian, Romania
