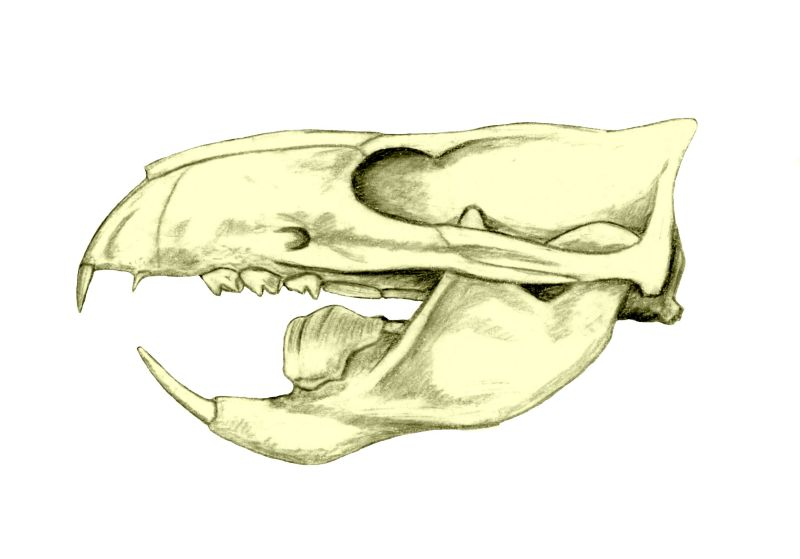
- Skull of P. mediaevus

Scientific classification
- Kingdom: Animalia
- Phylum: Chordata
- Class: Mammalia
- Order: †Multituberculata
- Suborder: †Cimolodonta
- Superfamily: †Ptilodontoidea
- Family: †Ptilodontidae
- Genus: †Ptilodus; Cope, 1881

Species
- P. fractus; P. gnomus; P. kummae; P. mediaevus; P. montanus; P. tsosiensis; P. wyomingensis

= Ptilodus =

Ptilodus Temporal range: Early Paleocene–Late Paleocene

Extinct genus of rodent-like mammals from the Paleocene epoch

Ptilodus (meaning "soft-haired") is an extinct genus of mammals from the extinct order of Multituberculata, and lived during the Palaeocene in North America.

Ptilodus was a relatively large multituberculate of 30 to 50 centimetres (12 to 20 in) in length, which is about the same size as a squirrel. Its feet, legs and long tail suggest it was a good climber, so it very possibly led a squirrel-like lifestyle.

Like other ptilodontids, it had a very large and elongated last lower premolar which formed a serrated slicing blade.

The genus was named by paleontologist Edward Drinker Cope in 1881. Cope also mistakenly assigned some material belonging to this genus to Chirox in 1884. Elements from Ectypodus (Jepsen, 1940) and Neoplagiaulax have also been reassigned to this genus.

== Species ==
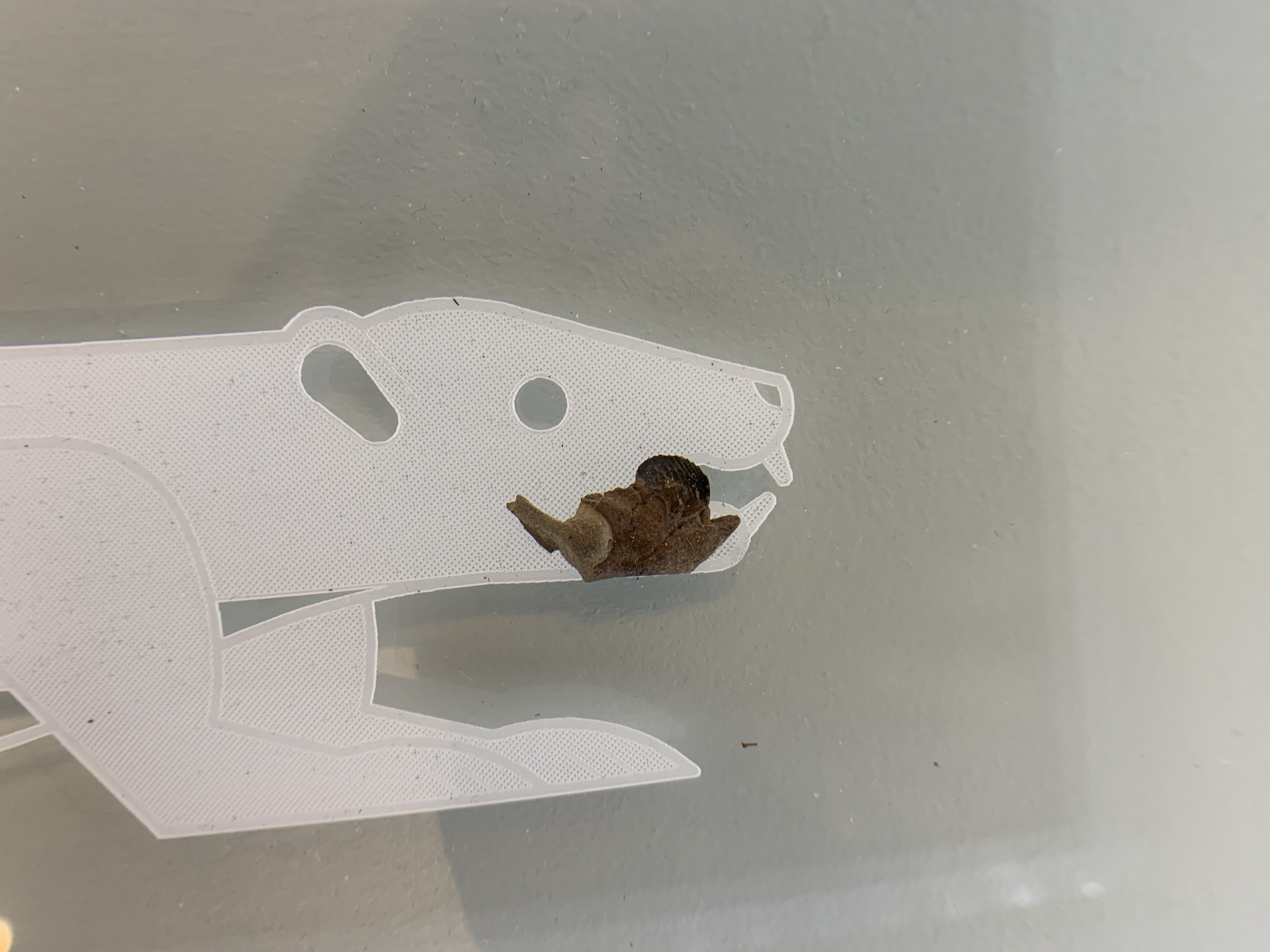
Ptilodus sp. (TMP 2009.161.0596) from the Paskapoo Formation

There are seven species, and others have been proposed at one time or another. P. nellieae (Bell, 1941) is apparently mentioned in a manuscript, rather than a publication. P. sinclairi (Simpson, 1935) seems to have become Parectypodus sinclairi. In botany, Ptilodus pyramidatus is an extinct Australian plant.

=== P. fractus ===
The species Ptilodus fractus had a body weight of about 95 grams (3.4 oz). Remains have been found in Wyoming, in the United States, in Dell Creek deposits dated to the Tiffanian stage of the Paleocene.

The species was named by J. A. Door in 1952 (Scott et al., 2002, Dorr, 1952), though it may have been amended to its current state by David Krause in 1987.

=== P. gnomus ===
Ptilodus gnomus is the smallest known member of the genus. Hence, the species epithet 'gnomus', which is Neo-Latin for 'dwarf'. Remains have been discovered in Wyoming in the United States, and Alberta, Canada. They were recovered from the Cochrane 2 deposits of the Paskapoo Formation, which have been dated to the Tiffanian stage of the Paleocene.

Remains of this species include over 100 teeth, (upper and lower), and at least one fragment of jaw. The teeth range from 2 to 5 millimetres (0.08 to 0.2 in) in length. The fourth lower premolar (p4) is about 51% shorter than the corresponding tooth in P. mediaevus; 28% less than P. kummae; 15% less than P. tsosiensis; and 5% smaller than P. fractus, which gives some idea of the relative sizes of the various animals. There are also differences in shape and the number of serrations. (Scott et al., 2002)

Although more similar in size to homologous teeth referable to P. tsosiensis and P. fractus, the upper and lower ultimate premolars of this new species most closely resemble those of P. mediaevus in overall morphology. (Scott et al., 2002)

A couple of isolated teeth which had been previously identified as perhaps belonging to Ectypodus, have been now been placed within this taxon. All referred specimens are held in the collection of the University of Alberta.

The species was named by C. R. Scott, R. C. Fox, and G. P. Youzwyshyn in 2002. Material assigned by Jepsen in 1940, as amended by Gazin in 1956, to Ectypodus hazeni has also been assigned to this species.

There are three species of this genus known from the Alberta location, two of which have yet to be described. This will be attended to by David W. Krause. (Scott et al., 2002, pg. 691).

=== P. kummae ===
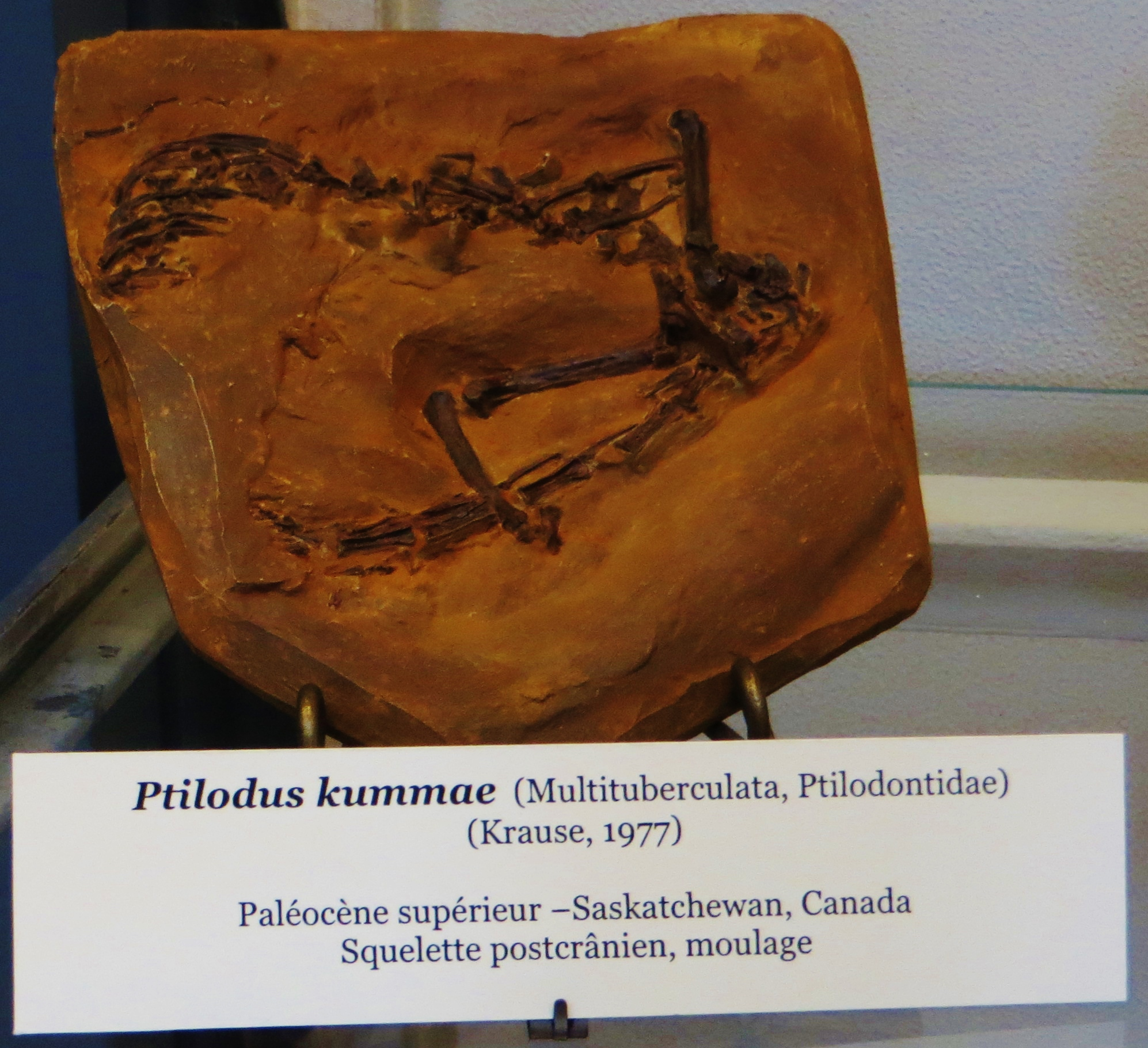
P. kummae

Ptilodus kummae has an estimated weight of 120 grams (4.2 oz). Remains have been discovered in Roche Percee, Saskatchewan in Canada, in deposits from the lower Tiffanian stage of the Paleocene.

The species was named by David W. Krause in 1977. (Krause, 1977) The holotype is at Alberta University.

=== P. mediaevus ===
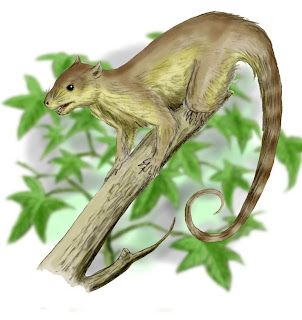
Restoration of P. mediaevus

Remains of Ptilodus mediaevus have been recovered in New Mexico, Utah, and Wyoming in the United States. They have been unearthed from the deposits of the San Juan Basin, which are dated to the Torrejonian stage of the Paleocene.

Cope named the species in 1881 (Cope, 1881). The species Ptilodus feronensis, or Ptilodus ferronensis, was named C. L. Gazin in 1941 (Gazin, 1941), but all material was reassigned to P. mediaevus by Rigby in 1980. In 1929, Granger and Simpson did the same thing to the species P. plicatus, which was originally named by J. W. Gidley in 1909. Chirox plicatus was named by Cope in 1884. He described it as a marsupial in 1884, but it is also part of this species.

=== P. montanus ===
Ptilodus montanus is a large species, about 650 grams (23 oz). A brain cast indicates a well-developed sense of smell. Remains were recovered in Montana, in the rock of the Silberling Quarry, which is dated to the lower Tiffanian stage of the Paleocene.

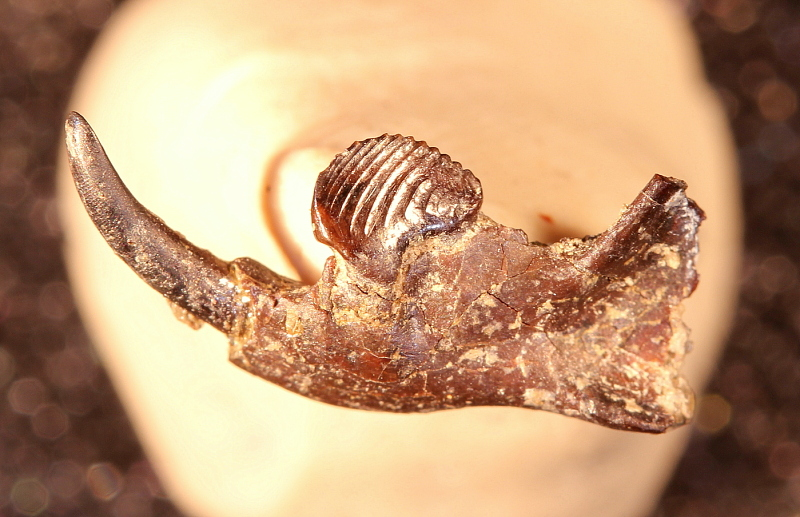
P. montanus

The species was named by E. Douglass in 1908 (Douglass, 1908). The species P. admiralis, first described by Hay in 1930; and P. gracillis, first described by J. W. Gidley in 1909 (Gidley, 1909) are now considered part of this species.

=== P. tsosiensis ===
Ptilodus tsosiensis has been discovered in New Mexico, the Puercan stage deposits of the Lower Paleocene San Juan Basin. The species was named by R. E. Sloan in 1981 (Sloan, 1981).

=== P. wyomingensis ===
Remains of Ptilodus wyomingensis have been found in the Middle Paleocene deposits of the Rock Bench Quarry, in Wyoming and North Dakota in the United States. The species was named by G. L. Jepsen in 1940 (Jepsen, 1940).

== Palaeobiology ==
=== Palaeoecology ===
Dental microwear patterns in Ptilodus mediaevus indicate that this animal was a highly generalist omnivore.

== See also ==
Media related to Ptilodus at Wikimedia Commons

- Evolution of mammals
