= Liotomus =

Liotomus Temporal range: 58.7–55.8 Ma

Scientific classification
- Kingdom: Animalia
- Phylum: Chordata
- Class: Mammalia
- Order: †Multituberculata
- Family: †Cimolodontidae
- Genus: †Liotomus; Cope, 1884

Species
- L. marshi; L. vanvaleni

Extinct family of mammals

Liotomus is a genus of extinct mammal from the Paleocene epoch (early Cenozoic era). It lived in Europe and North America, and was a member of the extinct order Multituberculata, lying within the suborder Cimolodonta and possibly the family Cimolodontidae.

The genus Liotomus was named by E. D. Cope in 1884. This genus is sometimes placed within family Eucosmodontidae (Jepsen 1940).

== Species ==
- Liotomus marshi (Lemoine, 1882)
  - L. marshi remains are known from the Upper Paleocene of Cernay, France.
  - L. marshi has been cited as a descendant of Anconodon gidleyi.
- Liotomus vanvaleni
  - L. vanvaleni remains are known from the San Juan Basin, New Mexico.
