= Mesodmops =

Mesodmops Temporal range: 55.8–48.6 Ma

Scientific classification
- Kingdom: Animalia
- Phylum: Chordata
- Class: Mammalia
- Order: †Multituberculata
- Family: †Neoplagiaulacidae
- Genus: †Mesodmops; Y. Tong and T. Wang, 1994

Species
- M. dawsonae

Extinct family of mammals

Mesodmops is a genus of small mammal from the Eocene of China. It was a late member of the extinct order of Multituberculata. It's within the suborder of Cimolodonta and family Neoplagiaulacidae. The genus was named by Y. Tong and T. Wang in 1994.

The primary species is Mesodmops dawsonae, also named by Tong and Wang. It has been found in the Lower Eocene of the Wutu Basin in Shandong, China.
