= Cernaysia =

Cernaysia Temporal range: Paleocene

Scientific classification
- Kingdom: Animalia
- Phylum: Chordata
- Class: Mammalia
- Order: †Multituberculata
- Family: †Neoplagiaulacidae
- Genus: †Cernaysia

Species
- C. davidi; C. manueli

Extinct family of mammals

Cernaysia is an extinct genus of mammal from the Paleocene of France and the United States. It existed in the age immediately following the extinction of the last dinosaurs. This animal was a member of the extinct order Multituberculata within the suborder Cimolodonta and family Neoplagiaulacidae.

The genus Cernaysia ("from Cernay") was named by Vianey-Liaud M. in 1986 based on two species. It has also been known as Carnaysia.

Fossil remains of the species Cernaysia davidi (Vianey-Liaud M. 1986) were found in Puercan (Lower Paleocene) strata of the San Juan Basin of New Mexico, (United States). Remains of the species Cernaysia manueli (Vianey-Liaud M. 1986) were found in Upper Paleocene strata from Cernay, France.
