= Clemensodon =

Clemensodon Temporal range: Late Cretaceous

Scientific classification
- Domain: Eukaryota
- Kingdom: Animalia
- Phylum: Chordata
- Class: Mammalia
- Order: †Multituberculata
- Family: †Eucosmodontidae
- Genus: †Clemensodon
- Species: †C. megaloba

Binomial name
- †Clemensodon megaloba Krause D.W., 1992

Extinct family of mammals

Clemensodon is a genus of extinct mammal from the Upper Cretaceous of North America. It lived during the end of the Mesozoic, also known as the "age of the dinosaurs". It was a member of the extinct order of Multituberculata within the suborder of Cimolodonta and family Eucosmodontidae. Fossil remains are restricted to teeth.

The main species of Clemensodon is Clemensodon megaloba, however, this species is also known as a part of Kimbetohia campi. Fossils have been found in the Lance Formation of Wyoming (United States). They age from the Maastrichtian division of the Upper Cretaceous. The species is based on a reassessment of a couple of Kimbetohia teeth, but not the entire species or genus. The assignment of this taxon to Eucosmodontidae is tentative.

Evidence from the size and number of serrations of certain teeth and its enamel microstructure indicates that Clemensodon is either a derived taeniolabidoid or a primitive ptilodontoid. Determination of which of these two alternatives is correct must await the recovery of teeth from other positions.
