= Loxaulax =

Loxaulax Temporal range: Early Cretaceous

Scientific classification
- Kingdom: Animalia
- Phylum: Chordata
- Class: Mammalia
- Order: †Multituberculata
- Family: †Eobaataridae
- Genus: †Loxaulax

Species
- L. valdensis (type) (Simpson G.G., 1928) (originally Dipriodon valdensis Woodward 1911); L. herreroi (Crusafont Pairo & Adrover, 1966) (originally Parendotherium herreroi)

Synonyms
- Parendotherium?

Extinct family of mammals

Loxaulax is a genus of extinct mammal from the Lower Cretaceous of southern England. It was a member of the also extinct order Multituberculata, and lived alongside the dinosaurs. It lies within the suborder "Plagiaulacida" and family Eobaataridae. The genus Loxaulax was named by Simpson G.G. in 1928 based on one species.

The holotype of Loxulax is known from a single molar. It is characterised by possessing "outer cusps of lower molar shortened antero-posteriorly, subselenodont, four in number. Inner cusps three." (Simpson, 1928).

Fossil remains of the species Loxaulax valdensis consist of a tooth found in Valanginian (Lower Cretaceous) strata belong to the Wadhurst Clay Formation of the Cliff End bonebed in Hastings, England. More recently, "Butler and Ford reported some IoW (Isle of Wight) Wealden mammal teeth several decades ago from the Wessex Formation. They identified one of the teeth as belonging to the multituberculate Loxaulax but weren't sure about the others. Other IoW Wealden mammal teeth have been found since but have yet to be written up," (with thanks to Darren Naish).

Representatives from the Isle of Wight Museum say that sieving is underway at one fossil location. This suggests new mammal finds are not unlikely.

Fossil remains of the species Loxaulax herreroi were found in the Barremian-age Camarillas Formation of Galve, Spain.
