= Neoplagiaulacidae =

Neoplagiaulacidae Temporal range: Late Cretaceous–Early Oligocene

Scientific classification
- Domain: Eukaryota
- Kingdom: Animalia
- Phylum: Chordata
- Class: Mammalia
- Order: †Multituberculata
- Superfamily: †Ptilodontoidea
- Family: †Neoplagiaulacidae

Genera
- Neoplagiaulax; Cernaysia; Ectypodus; Krauseia; Mesodma; Mesodmops; Mimetodon; Nidimys; Parectypodus; Paressonodon; Xanclomys; Xyronomys

Extinct family of mammals

Neoplagiaulacidae is a family of mammal within the extinct order Multituberculata. Fossil remains are known from the Upper Cretaceous through to the latest Eocene/early Oligocene. Representatives have been found in North America, Europe and Asia. They are the last multituberculates known.

Neoplagiaulacinae (Ameghino 1890) has been seen as a sub-family within Ptilodontidae (Cope, 1887). More recent thinking has it as a family. Synonyms are Ectypodidae (Sloan & Van Valen 1965) and Ectypodontidae (Sloan & Van Valen 1965). Most fossils are restricted to teeth. The family is part of the suborder of Cimolodonta within the superfamily of Ptilodontoidea.
