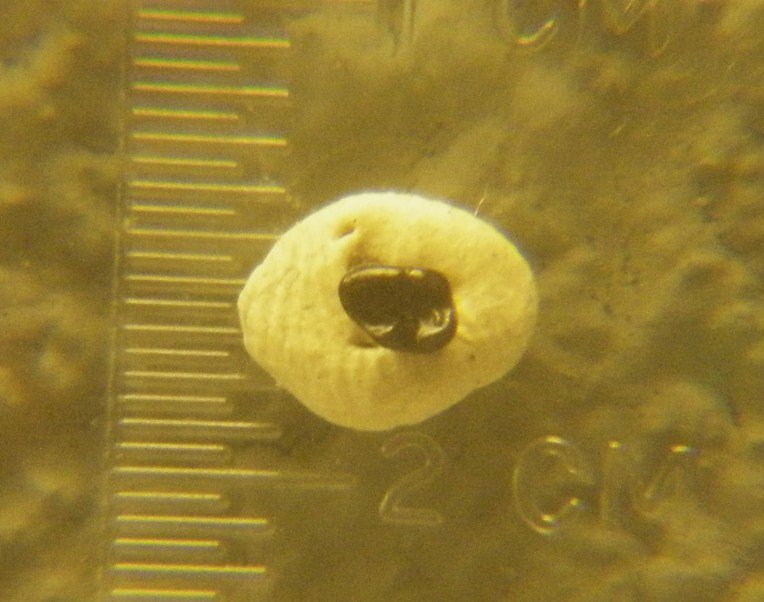
- Cimexomys minor fossil

Scientific classification
- Domain: Eukaryota
- Kingdom: Animalia
- Phylum: Chordata
- Class: Mammalia
- Order: †Multituberculata
- Clade: †Paracimexomys group (?)
- Genus: †Cimexomys; Sloan & Van Valen, 1965

Type species
- †Cimexomys minor Sloan and Van Valen, 1965

Other species
- †C. arapahoensis Middleton and Dewar, 2004; †C. gratus (Jepsen, 1930); †C. judithae Sahni, 1972; †"C." antiquus Fox, 1971; †"C." gregoryi Eaton, 1993

= Cimexomys =

Cimexomys Temporal range: Late Cretaceous-Paleocene, Santonian–Puercan

Extinct genus of North American mammal

Cimexomys is an extinct North American mammal that lived from the Upper Cretaceous to the Paleocene. For a while, it shared the world with dinosaurs, but outlived them. It was a member of the extinct order Multituberculata and lies within the suborder Cimolodonta. It is perhaps a member of the Paracimexomys group, though it is not certain.

The genus Cimexomys ("bug mouse") was named by Sloan and Van Valen in 1965. Most remains are restricted to teeth. "Cimex" means "bug", with reference to the type locality of Cimexomys minor in the Bug Creek Anthills in Montana, United States.

The inclusion of Cimexomys in the Paracimexomys group is tentative, (Kielan-Jaworowska & Hurum, 2001, p. 403). Some species are termed here as "Cimexomys", and they're listed towards the end. New species have previously been christened with great enthusiasm, and much reidentification has also occurred.

== Species ==
Further names include "Cimexomys" bellus, "C." clarki and "C." electus.

=== Cimexomys arapahoensis ===
Age: Lower Paleocene of the Denver Formation in Colorado (United States)
"C. arapahoensis is known from four dental and mandiblar fossils from the Alexander Locality of the Denver Formation (Colorado) and is the largest known species of Cimexomyx. I estimated its mass at about 120 g based on its lower first molar." (Eric W. Dewar, 2002) C. minor has also been identified from this location.

=== Cimexomys gratus ===
Age: Puercan (Paleocene) of the Polecat Bench Formation in Wyoming (USA). This animal weighed about 130 g, about five mice or a third of a rat.

=== Cimexomys judithae ===
This species (Sahni A. 1972) is also known as Paracymexomys judithae (Archibald J.D. 1982). Fossils come from the Campanian (Upper Cretaceous) of the Two Medicine Formation of Montana (USA). A near complete dentition and skeletal elements were discovered at Egg Mountain, a site associated with a dinosaur nesting colony, though this wasn't the original material. C. judithae is reportedly more derived than other species, and the integrity of the genus is suspect, (as reflected here by the later entries for "Cimexomys"). Montellano reassigned this species to the cimex genus in 1992. The body mass is estimated to have been around 20 g.

Based on the new material from Montana, the authors "argued that Cimexomys is too primitive to be included among either the Taeniolabidoidea or Ptilodontoidea. This agrees with our conclusion as we tentatively place Cimexomys in the informal "Paracimexomys group", which we erect for plesiomorphic (basal), poorly known members of the Cimolodonta", (Kielan-Jaworowska & Hurum, 2001, p. 393).

=== Cimexomys minor ===
(Sloan R.E. and Van Valen L. 1965)
Age: Upper Cretaceous - Lower Paleocene
Place: Hell Creek Formation, Montana and Denver Formation, Colorado (USA) and Ravenscrag Formation, Saskatchewan (Canada). Remains are small teeth of an eighth to a tenth of an inch in length. The animal weighed about 25 g, the same as a standard mouse.

=== "Cimexomys" antiquus ===
(Fox R.C. 1971). Fossils are known from the Santonian (Upper Cretaceous) of Utah. The type fossil is in Alberta, Canada. It weighed about 30 g.

=== Cimexomys gregoryi ===
Fossil remains of the species "Cimexomys" gregoryi (Eaton J.G. 1993) have been found in Campanian (Upper Cretaceous)-aged strata in the USA. This species shows similarities to the genus Bryceomys.
