= Prochetodon =

Scientific classification
- Kingdom: Animalia
- Phylum: Chordata
- Class: Mammalia
- Order: †Multituberculata
- Family: †Ptilodontidae
- Genus: †Prochetodon; Jepsen, 1940

Species
- P. cavus; P. foxi; P. taxus

Extinct family of mammals

Prochetodon is a genus of mammals from the extinct order Multituberculata. It lived during the Upper Paleocene and the Lower Eocene in North America. The genus was formally named by G. L. Jepsen in 1940. (Jepsen, 1940)

== P. cavus ==
The species Prochetodon cavus weighed about 135 g. Remains have been discovered in Wyoming, in the United States. They were found in the Princeton Quarry, and the deposits were dated from the Upper Paleocene to the Lower Eocene. Material is in the collection of the Peabody Museum of Natural History at Yale. The species was named by G. L. Jepsen in 1940. (Jepsen, 1940)

== P. foxi ==
The species Prochetodon foxi weighed about 200 g. Remains have been discovered in Wyoming and Montana in the United States, in the Long Draw Quarry, and in the Swan Hills of Alberta, Canada. The strata are dated to the Upper Paleocene. The species was named by David. W. Krause in 1987. (Krause, 1987)

== P. taxus ==
The species Prochetodon taxus weighed about 190 g. Remains have been discovered in Wyoming, in the United States, in the deposits of Clark's Fork Basin, which have been dated to the Upper Paleocene. David Krause first tentatively referred to the species P. cf. cavus in 1980, and then gave it its current classification in 1987. (Krause, 1987)
