= Xanclomys =

Xanclomys Temporal range: Torrejonian

Scientific classification
- Kingdom: Animalia
- Phylum: Chordata
- Class: Mammalia
- Order: †Multituberculata
- Family: †Neoplagiaulacidae
- Genus: †Xanclomys
- Species: †X. mcgrewi

Binomial name
- †Xanclomys mcgrewi Rigby J.K., 1980

Extinct species of mammal

Xanclomys is a small mammal from the Paleocene of North America. It was a genus within the extinct order Multituberculata within the suborder Cimolodonta and family Neoplagiaulacidae.

The genus Xanclomys, named by Rigby J.K. in 1980, is also known as Xancolomys. The identification is based on a single species, Xanclomys mcgrewi. Fossil remains were found in the Torrejonian (Paleocene)-age strata of the Swain Quarry in Wyoming (U.S.). Affinities are uncertain. There's perhaps a second, unnamed species.
