= Bryceomys =

Bryceomys Temporal range: Late Albian–Turonian (Cretaceous), 99–89 Ma

Scientific classification
- Kingdom: Animalia
- Phylum: Chordata
- Class: Mammalia
- Order: †Multituberculata
- Suborder: †Cimolodonta
- Family: †incertae sedis
- Genus: †Bryceomys

Species
- B. fumosus Eaton, 1995 (type); B. hadrosus Eaton, 1995; B. intermedius Eaton and Cifelli, 2001

Extinct genus of mammals

Bryceomys is an extinct genus of mammal that lived during the Late Cretaceous period and thus shared the world with dinosaurs. It was a member of the extinct order Multituberculata, within the suborder Cimolodonta and the informal Paracimexomys group. The genus is known only from isolated teeth recovered in Utah, United States. It was named by Eaton J.G. in 1995; the name means "Bryce mouse", after Bryce Canyon National Park.

== Description and paleobiology ==
Bryceomys is known only from isolated teeth—no jaws or postcranial bones have been found—so its body form and diet cannot be observed directly and are instead inferred from multituberculates as a group, which are generally reconstructed as small, superficially rodent-like omnivores.

The teeth carry the mix of features characteristic of the "Paracimexomys group". Eaton and Cifelli (2001) observed that Bryceomys and the related Cedaromys share several traits with the family Cimolodontidae while retaining primitive characters such as a stout lower incisor and gigantoprismatic enamel. On this basis they suggested that the Cimolodontidae may have originated from within the "Paracimexomys group" rather than from the Ptilodontoidea. Dental material of the type species, including the first upper molar, was figured and discussed in the review of multituberculate phylogeny by Kielan-Jaworowska and Hurum (2001).

Body mass estimated from tooth size varies between the species, from roughly 12 g in B. fumosus—about half the mass of a house mouse—to about 90 g in the larger B. hadrosus.

== Distribution and habitat ==
The two Turonian species, B. fumosus and B. hadrosus, come from the Straight Cliffs Formation of southwestern Utah, specifically its Smoky Hollow Member. This member was deposited in non-marine settings—coal-bearing coastal-plain, lagoonal, and river (including braided-stream) environments—on the alluvial coastal plain that bordered the western margin of the Western Interior Seaway. The older B. intermedius is known from the Mussentuchit Member of the Cedar Mountain Formation of Utah, part of an assemblage dated to about 98.37 million years ago, near the Albian–Cenomanian (Early–Late Cretaceous) boundary; this is the oldest well-sampled multituberculate assemblage known from the Cretaceous of North America.

== Species ==
Bryceomys fumosus (Eaton, 1995) is the type species. It is known from fossils in strata of Turonian age (early Late Cretaceous) in the Smoky Hollow Member of the Straight Cliffs Formation of Utah. About a hundred teeth, including the holotype, are held at the Oklahoma Museum of Natural History. The estimated body mass is about 12 g.

Bryceomys hadrosus (Eaton, 1995) is also from the Turonian of the Straight Cliffs Formation of Utah, with material likewise in the Oklahoma collection. Its estimated body mass is around 90 g.

Bryceomys intermedius (Eaton and Cifelli, 2001) is from the Cedar Mountain Formation of Utah, of late Albian to early Cenomanian age (near the Early–Late Cretaceous boundary).
