= Eucosmodontidae =

Eucosmodontidae Temporal range: Late Cretaceous - early Eocene

Scientific classification
- Domain: Eukaryota
- Kingdom: Animalia
- Phylum: Chordata
- Class: Mammalia
- Order: †Multituberculata
- Superfamily: †Djadochtatherioidea
- Family: †Eucosmodontidae

Genera
- Clemensodon; Eucosmodon; Stygimys

Extinct family of mammals

Eucosmodontidae is a poorly preserved family of fossil mammals within the extinct order Multituberculata. Representatives are known from strata dating from the Upper Cretaceous through the Lower Eocene of North America, as well as the Paleocene to Eocene of Europe. The family is part of the suborder of Cimolodonta. They might be related with the Djadochtatherioidea but without further finds, this remains unclear. Other than a partial snout, fossil evidence is limited to teeth. A 2021 study vindicates this relationship.

The taxonomic name Eucosmodontidae was given by Jepsen in 1940. Some authors interpret this version of Eucosmodontidae and Microcosmodontidae as being subfamilies rather than families.
