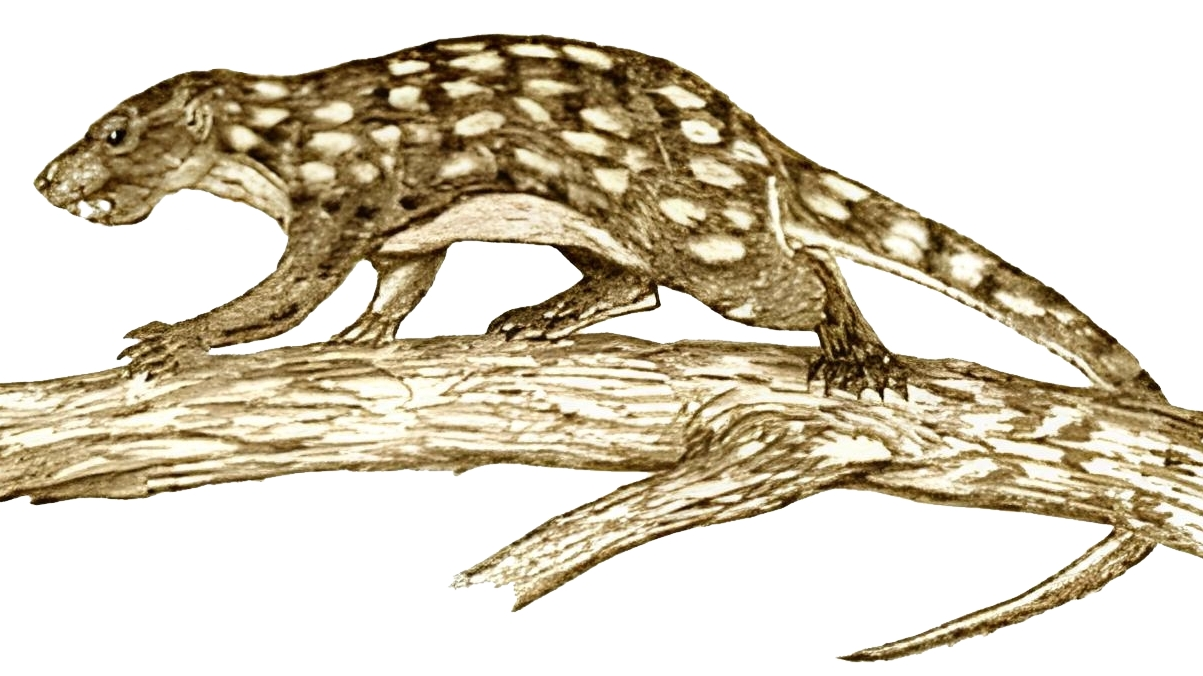

Scientific classification
- Kingdom: Animalia
- Phylum: Chordata
- Class: Mammalia
- Order: †Multituberculata
- Family: †Kogaionidae
- Genus: †Kogaionon; Rădulescu R. & Samson P., 1996
- Species: †K. ungureanui

Binomial name
- †Kogaionon ungureanui Rădulescu R. & Samson P., 1996

= Kogaionon ungureanui =

Kogaionon ungureanui Temporal range: Late Cretaceous

Genus of mammals

Kogaionon is a mammal genus from the Upper Cretaceous of Romania. It lived in Transylvania the same time as some of the last non-avian dinosaurs and was a member of the extinct order of Multituberculata. It was named after Kogaionon, the holy mountain of the ancient Dacians. It lies within the suborder Cimolodonta and the family Kogaionidae. The genus Kogaionon was named by Rădulescu R. and Samson P. in 1996.

This genus is known from one species, Kogaionon ungureanui, the fossil remains of which have been found in the Maastrichtian (Upper Cretaceous) Sinpetru Beds of the Hateg Formation in Romania. It is a micro-mammal, based on a well-preserved and near complete skull. The species name is in appreciation of the geologist Costin Ungureanu, who found the fossil.
