= Dakotamys =

Dakotamys Temporal range: Late Cretaceous

Scientific classification
- Domain: Eukaryota
- Kingdom: Animalia
- Phylum: Chordata
- Class: Mammalia
- Order: †Multituberculata
- Suborder: †Cimolodonta
- Genus: †Dakotamys
- Species: †D. malcolmi

Binomial name
- †Dakotamys malcolmi Eaton J.G., 1995

Extinct family of mammals

Dakotamys is a genus of extinct mammal that lived during the Upper Cretaceous. It shared the world with dinosaurs. This small creature was a member of the also extinct order Multituberculata within the suborder Cimolodonta and was a member of the Paracimexomys group.

The genus Dakotamys ("Dakota mouse") was named by Eaton J.G. in 1995. Dakota refers to the Dakota Formation. "Paracimexomys and Dakotamys... resemble the Eobaataridae in the structure of the upper and lower molars, with cusps showing a tendency to coalesce, and with ornamentation of grooves and ribs on the molars," (Kielan-Jaworowska & Hurum, 2001, p. 403).
