= Eucosmodon =

Eucosmodon Temporal range: Paleocene

Scientific classification
- Kingdom: Animalia
- Phylum: Chordata
- Class: Mammalia
- Order: †Multituberculata
- Family: †Eucosmodontidae
- Genus: †Eucosmodon; Matthew & Granger, 1921

Species
- E. americanus; E. molestus; E. primus

Extinct family of mammals

Eucosmodon is a genus of extinct mammal from the Paleocene of North America. It is a member of the extinct order of Multituberculata within the suborder of Cimolodonta, and the family Eucosmodontidae. This genus has partly also been known as Neoplagiaulax. All known fossils of this small mammal are restricted to teeth.

== Species ==
All known species of Eucosmodon have been found in the San Juan Basin of New Mexico (United States).

- Eucosmodon americanus is a species of which Puercan (Paleocene)-age fossils have been found. Some, but not all, of this fossil material has been reclassified as E. primus. This animal, which probably weighed something like 750 g, has been cited as a possible descendant of that species.
- Eucosmodon molestus is a species of Torrejonian (Paleocene) age. It has been cited as a possible descendant of E. americanus.
- Eucosmodon primus, also from the Puercan part of the Paleocene, have been found in the Nacimiento Formation of the San Juan Basin. This species is based on fossils originally ascribed to E. americanus.
- A possible fourth species, Eucosmodon kuszmauli, has also been named.
