= Varalphadon =

Varalphadon Temporal range: Cenomanian–Campanian

Scientific classification
- Kingdom: Animalia
- Phylum: Chordata
- Class: Mammalia
- Clade: Metatheria
- Genus: †Varalphadon; Johanson, 1996

Type species
- Protalphadon wahweapensis Cifelli, 1990

Other species
- Varalphadon creber Fox, 1971; Varalphadon crebreforme Cifelli, 1990; Varalphadon janetae Carneiro, 2018

Extinct genus of metatherian mammal

Varalphadon is an extinct genus of metatherian mammal that lived in North America during the Late Cretaceous epoch.

== Etymology ==
The specific epithet of the species Varalphadon janetae honours Janet W. Gillette for her contributions to the Museum of Northern Arizona.

== Taxonomy ==
Varalphadon has been suggested to have been a close relative of sparassodonts, but more recent phylogenetic analysis suggests that the apparent similarities between the two are the result of convergent evolution.
