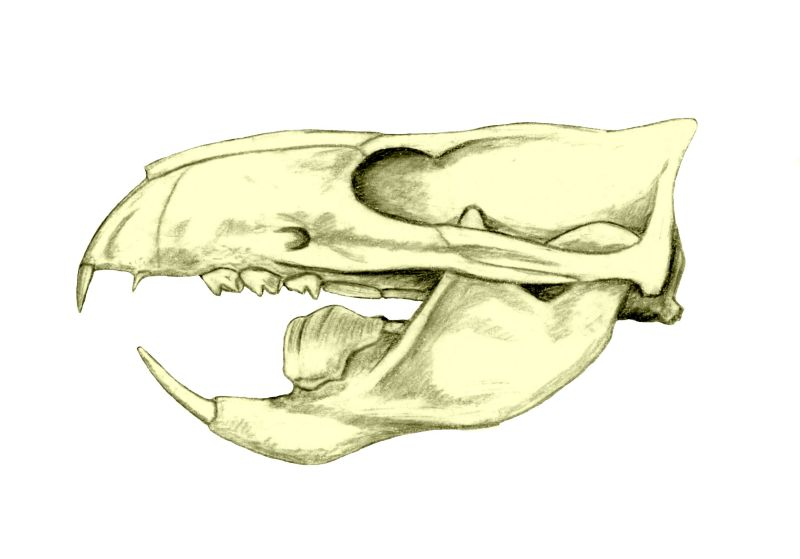
- Skull of Ptilodus

Scientific classification
- Domain: Eukaryota
- Kingdom: Animalia
- Phylum: Chordata
- Class: Mammalia
- Order: †Multituberculata
- Superfamily: †Ptilodontoidea
- Family: †Ptilodontidae; Cope, 1887

Genera
- Baiotomeus; Kimbetohia; Prochetodon; Ptilodus

= Ptilodontidae =

Ptilodontidae Temporal range: Late Cretaceous–Paleocene

Extinct family of mammals

Ptilodontidae is a family of primitive mammals within the extinct order Multituberculata. Representatives are known from the Upper Cretaceous and Paleocene of North America.

The Ptilodontidae family was originally named Ptilodontinae and classified as a subfamily by Edward Drinker Cope in 1887. It was amended by Gregory and Simpson in 1926 to its current status.

In addition, Cope mistakenly classified the Ptilodus genus as a marsupial. He originally named it Chirox, and placed it in the new family Chirogidae in 1887. Since it has been reclassified, and Chirogidae is now officially a synonym of Ptilodontidae.

One of the most outstanding features of this family of squirrel-like, arboreal mammals, was the peculiar shape of their last lower premolar. It was larger and more elongated than its neighbours, and its occlusive surface was formed into a serrated slicing blade. Most likely this tooth was used for crushing and opening seeds and nuts, but it is believed that the ptilodonts, like most small multituberculates, supplemented their diet with insects, worms, and fruits.
