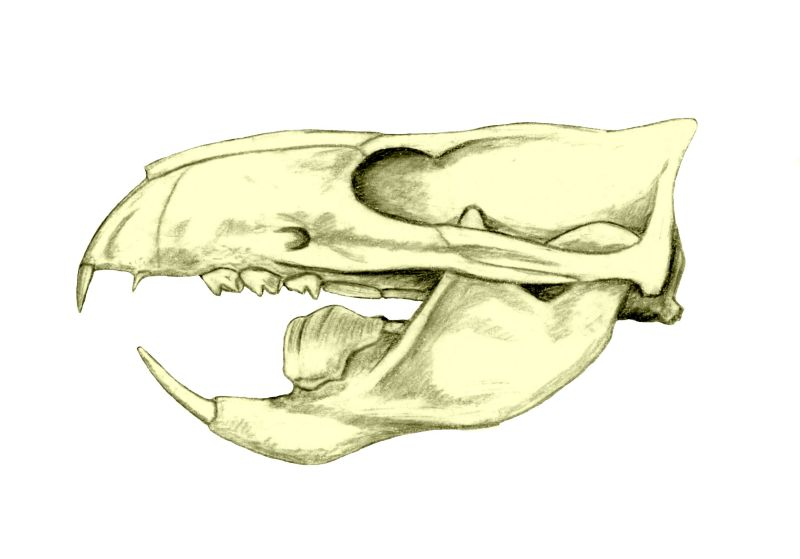
- Skull of Ptilodus

Scientific classification
- Domain: Eukaryota
- Kingdom: Animalia
- Phylum: Chordata
- Class: Mammalia
- Order: †Multituberculata
- Suborder: †Cimolodonta
- Superfamily: †Ptilodontoidea

Families
- Neoplagiaulacidae; Ptilodontidae; Cimolodontidae; Other genus; Neoliotomus; Filikomys

= Ptilodontoidea =

Extinct superfamily of mammals

Ptilodontoidea is a group of extinct mammals from the Northern Hemisphere. They were generally small, somewhat rodent-like creatures of the extinct order Multituberculata.

Some of these genera have a great many species, though remains are generally sparse. Ptilodus is among the best known; there is a tendency to depict it as an analog of a squirrel.

Upper Cretaceous remains are known from North America and Europe. Later representatives (Paleocene – Eocene) have been found in North America, Europe and Asia. These were some of the last multituberculates, and they are within the suborder Cimolodonta.

The superfamily is further divided into the following families:

- Neoplagiaulacidae - 10 genera;
- Ptilodontidae - 4 genera;
- Cimolodontidae - possibly 3 genera.

The affinities of Neoliotomus are less clear, though it seems to fit somewhere within the superfamily.
