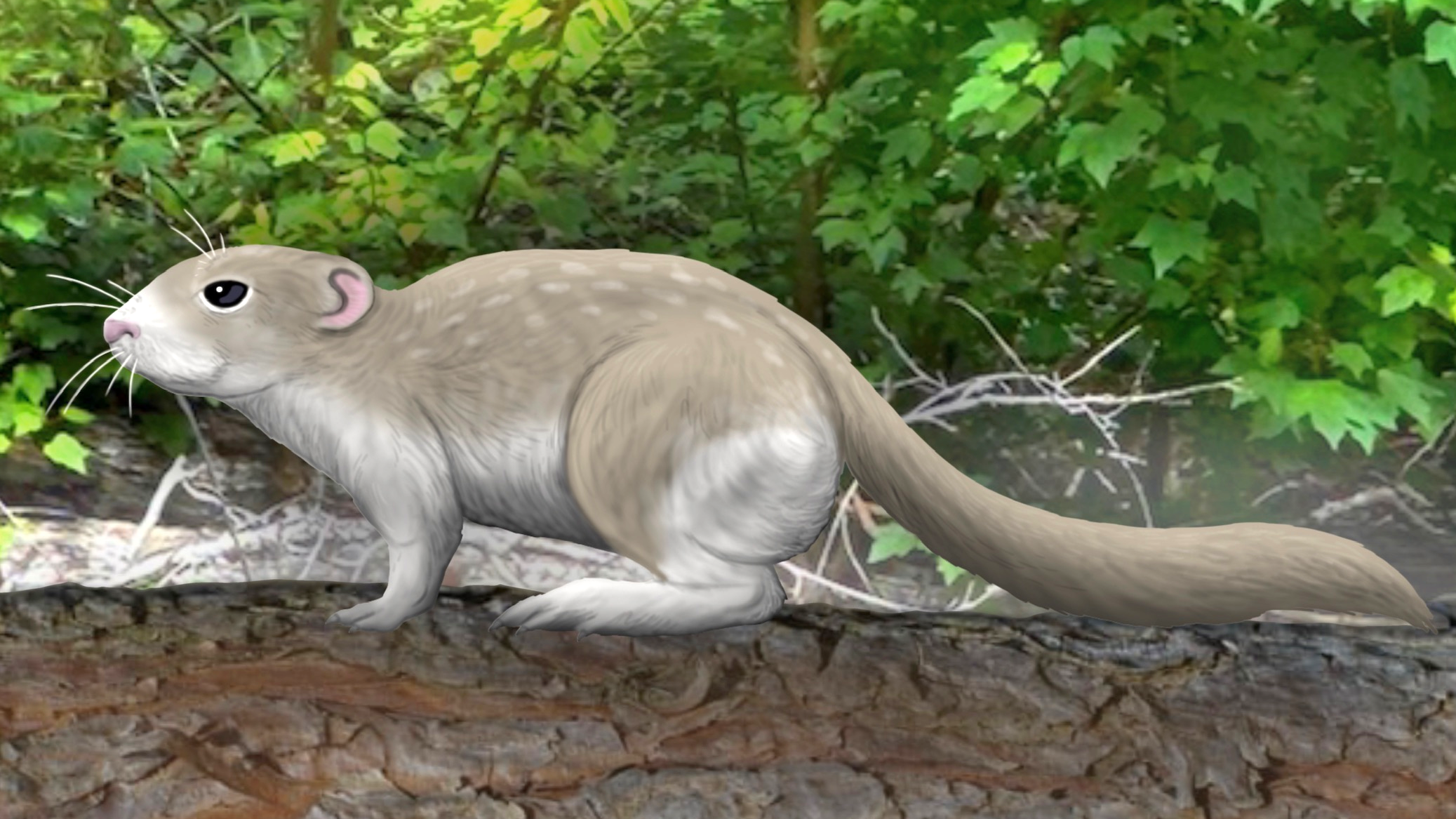
- Mesodma formosa, life restoration

Scientific classification
- Kingdom: Animalia
- Phylum: Chordata
- Class: Mammalia
- Order: †Multituberculata
- Family: †Neoplagiaulacidae
- Genus: †Mesodma

Species
- M. ambigua; M. formosa; M. hensleighi; M. pygmaea; M. senecta; M. thompsoni

= Mesodma =

Mesodma Temporal range: 83.6–56 Ma Possible Cenomanian record

Extinct family of mammals

Mesodma is an extinct genus of mammal, a member of the extinct order Multituberculata within the suborder Cimolodonta, family Neoplagiaulacidae. It lived during the upper Cretaceous and Paleocene Periods of what is now North America. The earliest definitive record is from the late Santonian stage strata of the Straight Cliffs Formation. A single premolar tooth from the lower Cenomanian stage strata of the Cedar Mountain Formation has been tentatively assigned to this genus based on its similarity, but its describers noted that it is unlikely that Mesodma lived during that time.

== Species ==
- Mesodma ambigua
  - Place: Mantua Lentil, Wyoming (USA)
  - Age: Maastrichtian-Puercan, Upper Cretaceous - Paleocene
  - Weight: about 55 g
- Mesodma formosa
  - Place: Hell Creek and Frenchman Formation, USA & Canada. This species is possibly also known from Utah.
  - Age: Maastrichtian-Puercan (Upper Cretaceous to the Paleocene).
  - Weight: about 30 g
- Mesodma hensleighi
  - Place: Hell Creek Formation in the U.S. and in Saskatchewan, Canada.
  - Age: Maastrichtian (Upper Cretaceous).
  - Weight: around 15 g
- Mesodma pygmaea
  - Place: Gidley Quarry, Montana, as well as Wyoming and Alberta, Canada
  - Age: Torrejonian-Tiffanian (Middle Paleocene).
  - Weight: about 8 g
- Mesodma senecta
  - Age: Campanian (Upper Cretaceous)
  - Weight: about 50 g
- Mesodma thompsoni (=M. garfieldensis)
  - Place: St Mary River Formation & Montana and Wyoming of the US and Canada
  - Age: Maastrichtian-Puercan, Upper Cretaceous - Paleocene
  - Weight: about 55 g

The species "Mesodma" primaeva from the Judithian of Western Interior of North America was formerly assigned to the genus Mesodma, but subsequently it was made the type species of a separate genus Filikomys.
