= Paracimexomys =

Paracimexomys Temporal range: Late Cretaceous, Santonian–Maastrichtian

Scientific classification
- Kingdom: Animalia
- Phylum: Chordata
- Class: Mammalia
- Order: †Multituberculata
- Clade: †Paracimexomys group
- Genus: †Paracimexomys

Species
- †P. magister; †P. magnus; †P. priscus; †P. propriscus (Hunter et al., 2010)

Extinct family of mammals

Paracimexomys is a genus of extinct mammals in the extinct Multituberculata order. Paracimexomys lived during the Cretaceous period. The few fossils remains come from North America. Some Romanian fossils were also tentatively assigned to this genus, though that classification now seems doubtful.

The genus Paracimexomys ("beside Cimexomys") was named by Archibald J.D. in 1982. Paracimexomys fossils were originally referred to as Cimexomys, until it was realized they were different enough to justify a genus of their own.

== Species ==
- Paracimexomys magister also known as Cimexomys magister- Remains were found in the Upper Santonian (Upper Cretaceous) of Utah, USA. The animal probably weighed about 100g when it was alive.
- Paracimexomys magnus also known as Cimexomys magnus- were found in the Campanian (Upper Cretaceous) strata of the Judith River Formation in Montana, USA.
- Paracimexomys priscus- Fossil remains were found in the Maastrichtian (Upper Cretaceous) of Hell Creek, Montana. Remains were first found in 1966. The holotype is in the collection of the University of Alberta, where the name Cimexomys is favoured. Weight is estimated to have been 60g.

=== Misassigned species ===
- Paracimexomys crossi- Remains have been found in the Middle Cretaceous (Upper Aptian to lower Albian) Antlers Formation of Oklahoma, USA. Based on a tiny tooth, this was the first reported Oklahoma Mesozoic mammal. It's also the oldest known member of the informal Paracimexomys group. The species' name honours the prison officer Bobby Cross, who has found this and other fossils.
- Paracimexomys perplexus- Found in the late Albian to early Cenomanian (Upper Cretaceous) in the Cedar Mountain Formation of Utah.
- Paracimexomys robisoni- Found in the Middle Cretaceous strata of the Cedar Mountain Formation of Utah. This type of fossil can be found in the Oklahoma Museum of Natural History. This mouse-sized animal weighed about 25g.
- Paracimexomys bestia is now the type species of Cedaromys.
