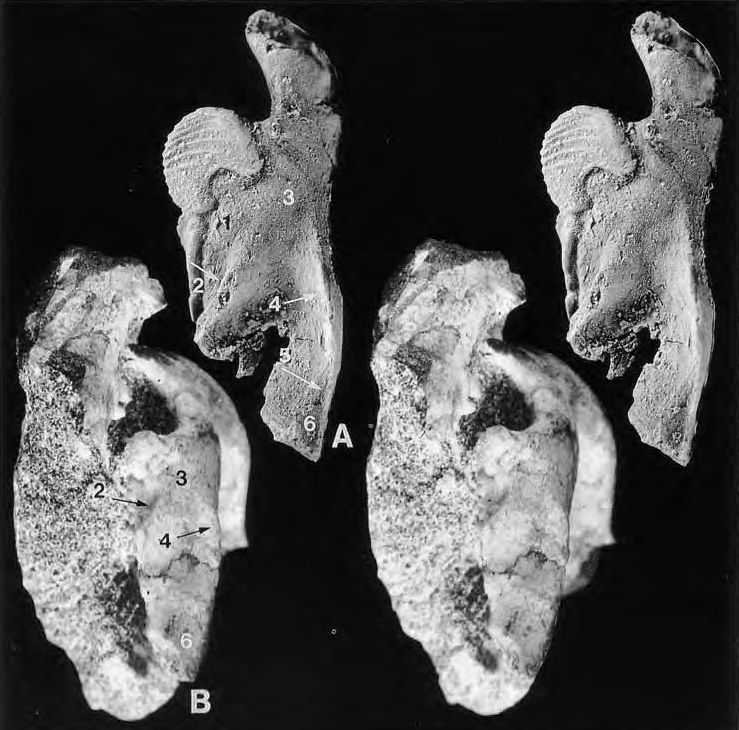
- E. szalayi lower jaw

Scientific classification
- Kingdom: Animalia
- Phylum: Chordata
- Class: Mammalia
- Order: †Multituberculata
- Family: †Neoplagiaulacidae
- Genus: †Ectypodus; Matthew and Granger, 1921

= Ectypodus =

Extinct genus of mammal

Ectypodus is an extinct genus of mammals, containing the species E. aphronorus, E. childei, E. musculus, E. lovei, E. powelli, E. szalayi, and E. tardus.

Ectypodus was an arboreal omnivore, living in the Paleocene to Eocene of North America and Europe.

A fossil of E. arctos was found on Ellesmere Island, Canada.

Ectypodus was first described by William Diller Matthew (1871–1930) and Walter W. Granger in 1921.

Ectypodus musculus was heavier than other subtaxa, weighing at 30 kg, while other subtaxa weighed at 15kg, except E. powelli, which weighed 20 kg.
