= Cedaromys =

Cedaromys Temporal range: Late Cretaceous

Scientific classification
- Kingdom: Animalia
- Phylum: Chordata
- Class: Mammalia
- Order: †Multituberculata
- Clade: †Paracimexomys group (?)
- Genus: †Cedaromys

Species
- C. bestia (Eaton and Cifelli, 1991) (type); C. minimus Eaton, 2009; C. parvus Eaton and Cifelli, 2001

Extinct family of mammals

Cedaromys ("Cedar mouse") is an extinct mammal which lived during the Upper Cretaceous, at the same time as many dinosaurs. It was a member of the also extinct order of Multituberculata. It's within the suborder of Cimolodonta, and a possible member of the Paracimexomys group.

== Species ==
The species Cedaromys bestia was originally named Paracimexomys bestia in 1991, but later reassigned to Cedaromys by Eaton and Cifelli in 2001. Fossils have been found in Albian (late) - Cenomanian (early), (both Upper Cretaceous)-aged strata of the Cedar Mountain Formation in Utah (United States).

Fossils of the species Cedaromys parvus (Eaton & Cifelli, 2001) have been found in strata of the same age in the Cedar Mountain Formation. This species is also in the Oklahoma collection. Suggested bodyweight is around 90 g.
