= Parectypodus =

Parectypodus Temporal range: 66.043–50.3 Ma

Scientific classification
- Kingdom: Animalia
- Phylum: Chordata
- Class: Mammalia
- Order: †Multituberculata
- Family: †Neoplagiaulacidae
- Genus: †Parectypodus

Species
- P. armstrongi; P. foxi; P. laytoni; P. lunatus; P. simpsoni; P. sinclairi; P. sloani; P. sylviae; P. trovessartianus; P. vanvaleni

Extinct genera of multituberculate mammals

Parectypodus (meaning "besides Ectypodus") is an extinct genus of mammals that lived from Late Cretaceous (Maastrichtian) to Eocene time in North America. It is a member of the extinct order of Multituberculata, suborder Cimolodonta, family Neoplagiaulacidae. It was named by G.L. Jepsen in 1930.

== Species ==
- Parectypodus armstrongi (Johnston, P.A. & Fox, R.C., 1984). From the Puercan (Paleocene) Ravenscrag Formation, site Rav W-1, Saskatchewan, Canada. This specimen resides in the collection of the University of Alberta.
- Parectypodus foxi (Storer, J.E., 1991). This Maastrichtian (Late Cretaceous)-age species from the Frenchman Formation of Saskatchewan is estimated to have weighed about 80 g.
- Parectypodus laytoni (Jepsen, G.L., 1940; Sloan, R.E., 1966), also known as Ectypodus laytoni (Jepsen 1940). Remains are known from the Lower Tiffanian (Middle-Late Paleocene) Princeton Quarry, Wyoming (United States). This species has been cited as a descendant of P. sinclairi. It is a small species, having a weight of perhaps 10 g.
- Parectypodus lunatus (Krause, D.W., 1982), also known as P. childei (Kühn, 1969). From the Wasatchian (Lower Eocene) Pocket Quarry of Colorado and Wyoming. This is a late species, having a weight of about 35 g.
- Parectypodus simpsoni (Jepsen, G.L., 1930). Eocene.
- Parectypodus sinclairi (Lamb, 1902; Clemens, 1964a). Known from the Puercan-Torrejonian (Paleocene) of Gidley Quarry, Montana, Wyoming, and Alberta, Canada. This species has been cited as having been derived from Mesodma formosa. It is a smaller species of about 15 g.
- Parectypodus sloani (Schiebout, J.A., 1974). Fossils of this species have been found in the Torrejonian (Paleocene)-age beds of Big Bend, Texas.
- Parectypodus sylviae (Rigby, J.K., 1980; Sloan, J.E., 1987) (=Ectypodus aphronorus (Sloan 1987), P. pattersoni (Sloan 1987)). Remains are known from the Torrejonian (Paleocene)-age Swain Quarry of Montana and Wyoming. The body weight of this species has been estimated as 15 g.
- Parectypodus trovessartianus (Cope, E.D., 1882; Van Valen & Sloan, 1966). From the Puercan-Torrejonian (Paleocene) of the San Juan Basin, New Mexico. The body mass of this species has been estimated to have been around 90 g.
- Parectypodus vanvaleni (Sloan, J.E. 1981). From the Puercan (Paleocene) of the San Juan Basin, New Mexico.
