= Neoplagiaulax =

Neoplagiaulax Temporal range: 66.043–56.8 Ma

Scientific classification
- Domain: Eukaryota
- Kingdom: Animalia
- Phylum: Chordata
- Class: Mammalia
- Order: †Multituberculata
- Family: †Neoplagiaulacidae
- Genus: †Neoplagiaulax

Species
- N. annae; ?N. burgessi; N. copei; N. donaldorum; N. eocaenus; N. grangeri; N. hazeni; N. hunteri; N. jepi; N. kremnus; N. macintyrei; N. macrotomeus; N. mckennai; N. nelsoni; N. nicolai; N. sylvani

Extinct family of mammals

Neoplagiaulax is a mammal genus from the Paleocene of Europe and North America. In the case of the latter continent, there may possibly be some slightly earlier, Upper Cretaceous material too. It existed in the age immediately following the extinction of the last dinosaurs. This animal was a member of the extinct order Multituberculata, lying within the suborder Cimolodonta and family Neoplagiaulacidae.

The genus Neoplagiaulax ("new Plagiaulax") was named by Lemoine V. in 1882.

== Species ==
- Neoplagiaulax annae (Vianey-Liaud M. 1986) has been found in Paleocene strata of Cernay, France.
- ?Neoplagiaulax burgessi (Archibald J.D. 1982) has been found in Maastrichtian (Upper Cretaceous) strata of Hell Creek, USA.
- Neoplagiaulax copei (Lemoine V. 1885) has been found in Paleocene strata of Cernay, France. It has been cited as a possible descendant of N. hazeni.
- Neoplagiaulax donaldorum (Scott C.S., Krause D.W. 2006) found in early Tiffanian (late Paleocene) strata in eastern Crazy Mountains, Montana.
- Neoplagiaulax eocaenus (Lemoine V. 1880)is also known as N. eocänus and Plagiaulax eocaenus. It was found in Upper Paleocene of Cernay, France. It has also been cited as a possible descendant of N. hazeni.
- Neoplagiaulax grangeri (Simpson G.G. 1935) (Gazin, 1969) is also known as Ectypodus? grangeri (Simpson, 1935). It was found in Torrejonian (Paleocene) of Gidley Quarry, Montana (USA). It was a further possible descendant of N. hazeni. Its weight was around 100 g, a quarter of that of a standard rat.
- Neoplagiaulax hazeni (Jepsen G.L. 1940; Krause D.W. 1977) is also known as Ectypodus hazeni (Jepsen G.L. 1940) and N. fractus (partially). It is known from the Tiffanian (Middle-Upper Paleocene) of Princeton Quarry, Wyoming and North Dakota (USA). Its body weight has been estimated at 95 g. Further material, including the type fossil, can be visited at the Peabody Museum of Natural History at Yale University.
- Neoplagiaulax hunteri (Simpson G.G. 1936), (Krause DW, 1977) is also known as Ectypodus hunteri (Simpson, 1936).It was discovered in Torrejonian-Tiffanian (Middle Paleocene) strata of Scarritt Quarry in Montana, Wyoming and North Dakota and Alberta, Canada. Several specimens are at the Peabody Museum of Yale, where the name E. is sometimes employed. It likely weighed about 45 g.
- Neoliotomus jepi (Sloan R.E. 1987) is known from the Tiffanian (Paleocene) of Cedar Point Quarry, Wyoming (USA).
- Neoplagiaulax kremnus (Johnston P.A. and Fox R.C. 1984) was found in Puercan (Lower Paleocene) strata of Rav W-1 in Saskatchewan, Canada. The holotype is in the collection of the University of Alberta.
- Neoplagiaulax macintyrei (Sloan R.E. 1981) was found in Puercan (Lower Paleocene) San Juan Basin of New Mexico and Utah (USA).
- Neoliotomus macrotomeus (Wilson 1956; Sloan 1987) is also known as Ectypodus macrotomeus (Wilson 1956. It was found in Puercan-Torrejonian (Lower Paleocene) strata of the San Juan Basin of New Mexico (USA). It is possibly derived from Mesodma formosa. It weighed about 15 g.
- Neoplagiaulax mckennai (Sloan R.E. 1987)is also known as N. mckennaiai. It was found in Tiffanian (Middle-Upper Paleocene) strata of Love Quarry in Wyoming and North Dakota. It weighed an estimated 60 g.
- Neoplagiaulax nelsoni (Sloan R.E. 1987)was discovered in the Puercan-Torrejonian (Middle-Upper Paleocene) strata of Wyoming and Purgatory Hill of Montana and Alberta. The type fossil is from Keefer Hill (a.k.a. Shotgun) Wyoming. This species was mouse-sized, weighing about 25 g.
- Neoplagiaulax nicolai (Vianey-Liaud M. 1986) was discovered in Paleocene strata of Cernay, France.
- Neoplagiaulax sylvani (Vianey-Liaud M. 1986) was found in Paleocene strata of Cernay, France.
