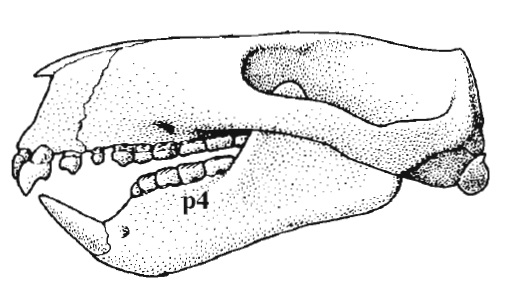
- Paulchoffatia skull

Scientific classification
- Kingdom: Animalia
- Phylum: Chordata
- Class: Mammalia
- Order: †Multituberculata
- Suborder: †Plagiaulacida

Families
- †Albionbaataridae; †Allodontidae; †Eobaataridae; †Paulchoffatiidae; †Pinheirodontidae; †Plagiaulacidae; †Zofiabaataridae

= Plagiaulacida =

Plagiaulacidans Temporal range: Middle Jurassic–Cenomanian

Extinct suborder of mammals

Plagiaulacida is a group of extinct multituberculate mammals. Multituberculates were among the most common mammals of the Mesozoic, "the age of the dinosaurs". Plagiaulacids are a paraphyletic grouping, containing all multituberculates that lie outside of the advanced group Cimolodonta. They ranged from the Middle Jurassic Period to the early Late Cretaceous of the Northern Hemisphere. During the Cenomanian, they were replaced by the more advanced cimolodontans.

Kielan-Jaworowska and Hurum (2001) divides "Plagiaulacida" into three informal lineages, the paulchoffatiids, the plagiaulicids, and the allodontids.

== Allodontid line ==
The Allodontid line may be a superfamily, Allodontoidea.

Both allodontids and paulchoffatiids (below) were among the most basal of the plagiaulacids. The Allodontid line contains:

The family Allodontidae is known from two genera from the Upper Jurassic Morrison Formation of North America.

The family Zofiabaataridae contains a single genus, Zofiabaatar and is also from the Morrison Formation. The affinities of a further Morrison Formation genus, Glirodon, are unclear, but it's also within the Allodontid line.

== Paulchoffatiid line ==
The Paulchoffatiid line may be a superfamily, Paulchoffatioidea.

Some remains from the Middle Jurassic of England might belong within this group. Representatives are best known from the Upper Jurassic, (especially from Guimarota, Portugal), though some were still extant during the Lower Cretaceous.

The genera of the family Paulchoffatiidae are divided into two of subfamilies, plus a couple of harder-to-place individuals:

- Subfamily Paulchoffatiinae includes Paulchoffatia and its relatives. This taxon contains nine genera.
- Subfamily Kuehneodontinae consists solely of the genus Kuehneodon, though there are half-a-dozen named species.

Other genera include Angrivarodon, Galveodon, and Sunnyodon, based on teeth from the Lower Cretaceous of Germany, Spain, and England respectively.

Also referable to the paulchoffatiid line, but not the family itself, is the family Pinheirodontidae, which is known from Early Cretaceous teeth found in Iberia and England. As well as Rugosodon from the Middle-Late Jurassic of China.

== Plagiaulacid line (possibly Superfamily Plagiaulacoidea) ==
Family Plagiaulacidae is known from the Upper Jurassic (North America) to Lower Cretaceous (Europe), being represented by Plagiaulax, Bolodon, and Morrisonodon.

Family Albionbaataridae is known from the Upper Jurassic to Lower Cretaceous of Europe and Asia, (China – undescribed, 2001). These were shrew-sized Multituberculates, with some similarities to the paulchoffis.

Members of the family Eobaataridae display dental similarities with members of Paracimexomys group, (Cimolodonta). They are known from the Upper Jurassic to Lower Cretaceous of Europe and Asia.

Sinobaatar was described after the study by Kielan-Jaworowska and Hurum (2001). The Mongolian word 'baatar' is frequently employed in the nomenclature of Multituberculates. This reflects the fact that many of the most complete fossils have been recovered from sites in Mongolia, though this more applies to members of the more derived Cimolodonta.

A couple of further genera possibly fit somewhere within "Plagiaulacida". This has been tentatively proposed for Janumys of the Middle Cretaceous. Its contemporary, Ameribaatar, is of uncertain affinities. Both were first described late in 2001.

== Taxonomy ==
Subclass †Allotheria Marsh, 1880

- Order †Multituberculata Cope, 1884:
  - suborder †Plagiaulacida Simpson 1925
    - Family †Paulchoffatiidae Hahn, 1969
      - subfamily †Paulchoffatiinae Hahn, 1971
        - Genus †Paulchoffatia Kühne, 1961
          - Species †P. delgador Kühne, 1961
        - Genus †Pseudobolodon Hahn, 1977
          - Species †P. oreas Hahn, 1977
          - Species †P. krebsi Hahn & Hahn, 1994
        - Genus †Henkelodon Hahn, 1987
          - Species †H. naias Hahn, 1987
        - Genus †Guimarotodon Hahn, 1969
          - Species †G. leiriensis Hahn, 1969
        - Genus †Meketibolodon (Hahn, 1978) Hahn, 1993
          - Species †M. robustus (Hahn, 1978) Hahn, 1993
        - Genus †Plesiochoffatia Hahn & Hahn, 1999
          - Species †P. thoas Hahn & Hahn, 1998
          - Species †P. peparethos Hahn & Hahn, 1998
          - Species †P. staphylos Hahn & Hahn, 1998
        - Genus †Xenachoffatia Hahn & Hahn, 1998
          - Species †X. oinopion Hahn & Hahn, 1998
        - Genus †Bathmochoffatia Hahn & Hahn, 1998
          - Species †B. hapax Hahn & Hahn, 1998
        - Genus †Kielanodon Hahn, 1987
          - Species †K. hopsoni Hahn, 1987
        - Genus †Meketichoffatia Hahn, 1993
          - Species †M. krausei Hahn, 1993
        - Genus †Galveodon Hahn & Hahn, 1992
          - Species †G. nannothus Hahn & Hahn, 1992
        - Genus †Sunnyodon Kielan-Jaworowska & Ensom, 1992
          - Species †S. notleyi Kielan-Jaworowska & Ensom, 1992
      - Subfamily †Kuehneodontinae Hahn, 1971
        - Genus †Kuehneodon Hahn, 1969
          - Species †K. dietrichi Hahn, 1969
          - Species †K. barcasensis Hahn & Hahn, 2001
          - Species †K. dryas Hahn, 1977
          - Species †K. guimarotensis Hahn, 1969
          - Species †K. hahni Antunes, 1988
          - Species †K. simpsoni Hahn, 1969
          - Species †K. uniradiculatus Hahn, 1978
      - Family †Pinheirodontidae Hahn & Hahn, 1999
        - Genus †Pinheirodon Hahn & Hahn, 1999
          - Species †P. pygmaeus Hahn & Hahn, 1999
          - Species †P. vastus Hahn & Hahn, 1999
        - Genus †Bernardodon Hahn & Hahn, 1999
          - Species †B. atlantica Hahn & Hahn, 1999
        - Genus †Gerhardodon Kielan-Jaworowska & Ensom, 1992
          - Species †G. purbeckensis Kielan-Jaworowska & Ensom, 1992
        - Genus †Iberodon Hahn & Hahn, 1999
          - Species †I. quadrituberculatus Hahn & Hahn, 1999
        - Genus †Lavocatia Canudo & Cuenca-Bescós, 1996
          - Species †L. alfambrensis Canudo & Cuenca-Bescós, 1996
        - Genus †Ecprepaulax Hahn & Hahn, 1999
          - Species †E. anomala Hahn & Hahn, 1999
      - Family †Allodontidae Marsh, 1889
        - Genus †Ctenacodon Marsh, 1879
          - Species †C. serratus Marsh, 1879
          - Species †C. nanus Marsh, 1881
          - Species †C. laticeps Marsh, 1881
          - Species †C. scindens Simpson, 1928
        - Genus †Psalodon Simpson, 1926
          - Species †P. potens Marsh, 1887
          - Species †P. fortis Marsh, 1887
          - Species †P. marshi Simpson, 1929
      - Family †Zofiabaataridae Bakker, 1992
        - Genus †Zofiabaatar Bakker & Carpenter, 1990
          - Species †Z. pulcher Bakker & Carpenter, 1990
      - Family Incertae sedis
        - Genus †Glirodon Engelmann & Callison, 2001
        - Species †G. grandis Engelmann & Callison, 2001
      - Family †Plagiaulacidae Gill, 1872
        - Genus †Morrisonodon Hahn and Hahn, 2004
          - Species †M. brentbaatar Bakker, 1998
        - Genus †Plagiaulax Falconer, 1857
          - Species †P. becklesii Falconer, 1857
        - Genus †Bolodon Owen, 1871
          - Species †B. crassidens Owen, 1871
          - Species †B. falconeri Owen, 1871
          - Species †B. minor Falconer, 1857
          - Species †B. osborni Simpson, 1928
          - Species †B. elongatus Simpson, 1928
      - Family †Eobaataridae Kielan-Jaworowska, Dashzeveg & Trofimov, 1987
        - Genus †Eobaatar
          - Species †E. magnus Kielan-Jaworowska, Dashzeveg & Trofimov, 1987
          - Species †E. minor Kielan-Jaworowska, Dashzeveg & Trofimov, 1987
          - Species †E. hispanicus Hahn & Hahn, 1992
          - Species †E. pajaronensis Hahn & Hahn, 2001
        - Genus †Loxaulax Simpson, 1928
          - Species †L. valdensis Simpson, 1928
        - Genus †Monobaatar Kielan-Jaworowska, Dashzeveg & Trofimov, 1987
          - Species †M. mimicus Kielan-Jaworowska, Dashzeveg & Trofimov, 1987
        - Genus †Parendotherium Crusafont Pairó & Adrover, 1966
          - Species †Parendotherium herreroi Crusafont Pairó & Adrover, 1966
        - Genus †Sinobaatar Hu & Wang, 2002
          - Species †Sinobaatar lingyuanensis Hu & Wang, 2002
        - Genus †Heishanobaatar Kusuhashi et al., 2010
          - Species †H. triangulus Kusuhashi et al., 2010
        - Genus †Teutonodon Martin et al 2016
          - Species †Teutonodon langenbergensis Martin et al., 2016
      - Family †Albionbaataridae Kielan-Jaworowska & Ensom, 1994
        - Genus †Albionbaatar Kielan-Jaworowska & Ensom, 1994
          - Species †A. denisae Kielan-Jaworowska & Ensom, 1994
        - Genus †Proalbionbaatar Hahn & Hahn, 1998
          - Species †P. plagiocyrtus Hahn & Hahn, 1998
        - Genus †Kielanobaatar Kusuhashi et al., 2010
          - Species †K. badaohaoensis Kusuhashi et al., 2010
      - Family †Arginbaataridae Hahn & Hahn, 1983
        - Genus †Arginbaatar Trofimov, 1980
          - Species †Arginbaatar dmitrievae Trofimov, 1980

== Phylogeny ==
Cladogram after Carvalho et al. 2025:

- Multituberculata
  - - Pinheirodontidae
    - Paulchoffatiidae
  - - Glirodon
    - - Ctenacodon
      - - Zofiabaatar
        - - Bolodon
          - - Plagiaulax
            - - Eobaataridae
              - - Arginbaatar
                - Cimolodonta
