= Pinheirodontidae =

Pinheirodontidae Temporal range: Late Jurassic–Early Cretaceous

Scientific classification
- Kingdom: Animalia
- Phylum: Chordata
- Class: Mammalia
- Order: †Multituberculata
- Suborder: †Plagiaulacida
- Family: †Pinheirodontidae; Hahn and Hahn, 1999

Genera
- Pinheirodon; Bernardodon; Bructerodon; Cambelodon; Ecprepaulax; Gerhardodon; Iberodon; Lavocatia; Cantalera; Teutonodon

Extinct family of mammals

Pinheirodontidae is a poorly known family of fossil mammals which belong to the informal suborder "Plagiaulacida" within the order Multituberculata. Remains are known from the Late Jurassic to Early Cretaceous of Europe (predominantly Portugal and Spain), but are so far restricted to isolated teeth, as well as a single lower jaw. The family Pinheirodontidae was named by Hahn G. and Hahn R. in 1999, after the locality of Porto Dinheiro, in central west Portugal.

Their closest relatives are believed to be Paulchoffatiidae. Cladogram after Carvalho et al. 2025

- Multituberculata
  - - Pinheirodontidae
    - Paulchoffatiidae
  - - Glirodon
    - - Ctenacodon
      - - Zofiabaatar
        - - Bolodon
          - - Plagiaulax
            - - Eobaataridae
              - - Arginbaatar
                - Cimolodonta
