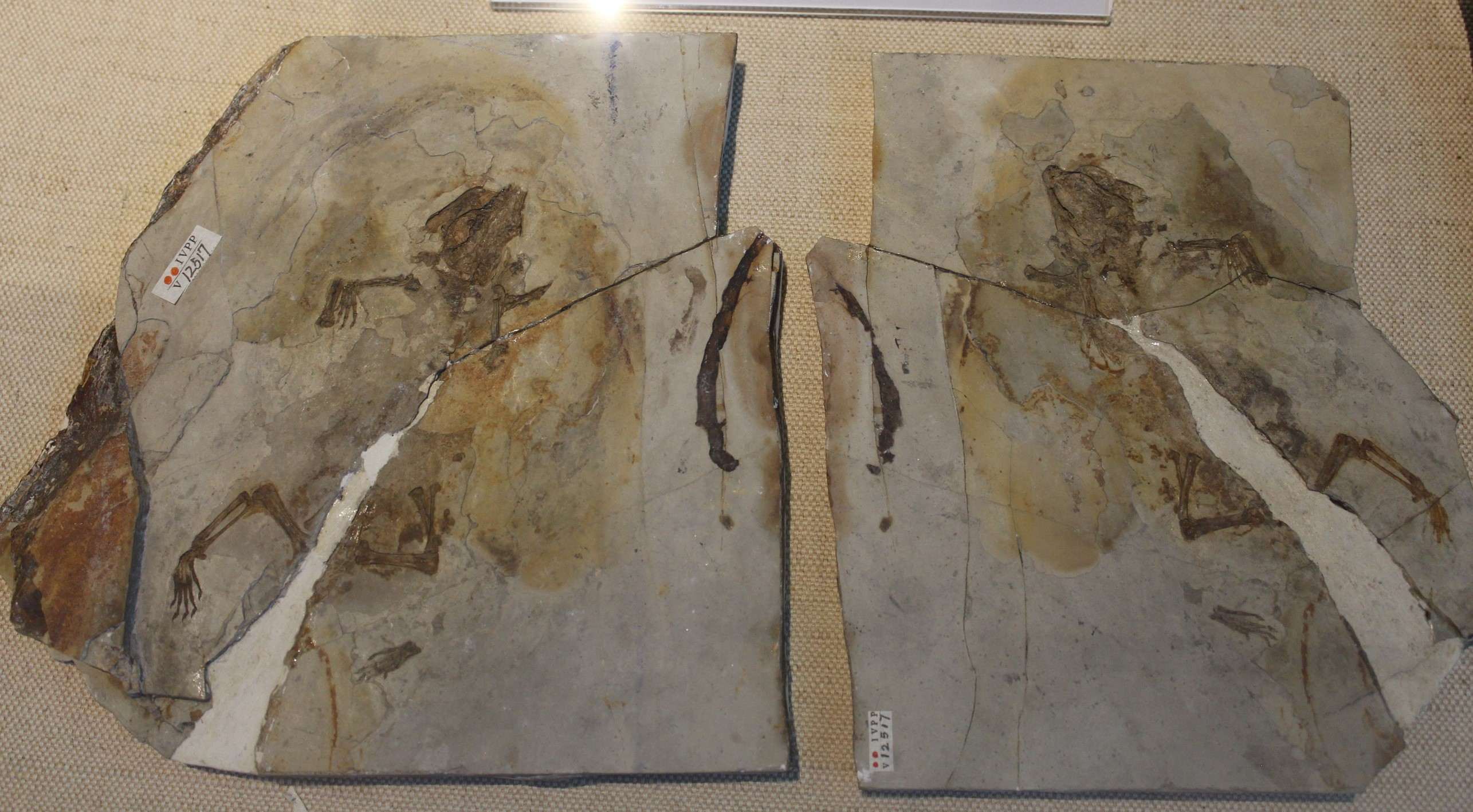
- Fossil of Sinobaatar

Scientific classification
- Kingdom: Animalia
- Phylum: Chordata
- Class: Mammalia
- Order: †Multituberculata
- Suborder: †Plagiaulacida
- Family: †Eobaataridae; Kielan-Jaworowska et al., 1987

Genera
- Cheruscodon; Dolichoprion; Eobaatar; Heishanobaatar; Iberica; ?Indobaatar; Loxaulax; Parendotherium; Sinobaatar; Jeholbaatar; Monobaatar?; Liaobaatar; Hakusanobaatar; Tedoribaatar

= Eobaataridae =

Eobaataridae Temporal range: Early Cretaceous 154–100 Ma

Extinct family of mammals

Eobaataridae is a family of fossil mammals within the order Multituberculata. Remains are known from the Lower Cretaceous of Europe and Asia. They are among the most derived representatives of the informal suborder "Plagiaulacida", and closely related to Cimolodonta. Most eobaatarids are only known from isolated teeth, though several reasonably complete members are known, including Sinobaatar and Jeholbaatar. The body of Sinobaatar is generalised, while Jeholbaatar displays clear adaptations for scansoriality (climbing) due to its elongated digits. Due to the morphology of the cheek teeth, Eobaatar and Jeholbaatar are inferred to be omnivorous, likely feeding on plants and invertebrates.

Indobaatar from the Early Jurassic Kota Formation has been suggested to be the earliest known multituberculate, let alone the earliest eobaatarid, and may stretch the eobaatarid-cimolodontan group much earlier than previously thought. However its referral to the family has been considered questionable by other scholars.

Fossils of Jeholbaatar kielanae seem to show that multituberculates independently acquired a middle ear from other mammal groups.

Cladogram after Carvalho et al. 2025:

- Multituberculata
  - - Pinheirodontidae
    - Paulchoffatiidae
  - - Glirodon
    - - Ctenacodon
      - - Zofiabaatar
        - - Bolodon
          - - Plagiaulax
            - - Eobaataridae
              - - Arginbaatar
                - Cimolodonta

== Etymology ==
The name "Eobaatar" (from ancient Greek "ἠώς"= dawn and Mongolian "baatar"= hero) means "dawn hero".
