= Morrisonodon =

Morrisonodon Temporal range: Late Jurassic

Scientific classification
- Kingdom: Animalia
- Phylum: Chordata
- Class: Mammalia
- Order: †Multituberculata
- Family: †Allodontidae (?)
- Genus: †Morrisonodon; Hahn & Hahn, 2004
- Species: †M. brentbaatar

Binomial name
- †Morrisonodon brentbaatar (Bakker, 1998)

Synonyms
- Ctenacodon brentbaatar

Extinct species of mammal

Morrisonodon brentbaatar is an extinct multituberculate mammal from the Upper Jurassic Morrison Formation of North America.

M. brentbaatar was described by Robert T. Bakker in 1998, who originally placed it in the genus Ctenacodon. The fossil remains consist of a jaw fragment containing two upper premolars and the sockets corresponding to two molars. The remains were found in the Upper Jurassic Morrison Formation in Wyoming. The species name honours the Wyoming paleontologist Brent Breithaupt, while "Baatar" is a Mongolian for "hero".

Bakker assigned his specimens to Ctenacodon with hesitation, noting additional specimens may require a new classification. In a 2001 review of multituberculates, Zofia Kielan-Jaworowska and Jørn Hurum did not recognize Bakker's specimen as related to other Ctenacodon species or even belonging to the family Allodontidae, speculating the species might instead belong to the family Plagiaulacidae. In 2004, the species was placed in the newly established genus Morrisonodon.
