= Dolichoprion =

Dolichoprion Temporal range: Early Cretaceous

Scientific classification
- Kingdom: Animalia
- Phylum: Chordata
- Class: Mammalia
- Order: †Multituberculata
- Family: †Eobaataridae
- Genus: †Dolichoprion
- Species: †D. lii

Binomial name
- †Dolichoprion lii Kasuhashi et al., 2019

Extinct genus of mammals

Dolichoprion is an extinct genus of eobaatarid that inhabited China during the Early Cretaceous. It contains a single species, D. lii.
