= Proalbionbaatar =

Proalbionbaatar Temporal range: Upper Jurassic

Scientific classification
- Kingdom: Animalia
- Phylum: Chordata
- Class: Mammalia
- Order: †Multituberculata
- Family: †Albionbaataridae
- Genus: †Proalbionbaatar
- Species: †P. plagiocyrtus

Binomial name
- †Proalbionbaatar plagiocyrtus G. Hahn & R. Hahn, 1998

Species of mammal

Proalbionbaatar is a small mammal from the Upper Jurassic of Guimarota, Portugal. It's the most derived member of the order Multituberculata known from that locality, and shared the world with the much larger dinosaurs. It lies within the suborder "Plagiaulacida" and family Albionbaataridae.

The genus Proalbionbaatar was named by Hahn G. and Hahn R. in 1998, based on a single species. The name refers to it being both earlier and more basal than Albionbaatar, a broadly similar form known from the Lower Cretaceous of Dorset, England.

The species Proalbionbaatar plagiocyrtus was named by Hahn G. and Hahn R. in 1998. Fossil remains are known from the Kimmeridgian (Upper Jurassic)-age strata of Guimarota, Portugal. Remains are presently restricted to two isolated upper molars, which are smaller than the corresponding teeth of paulchoffatiids (Paulchoffatiidae is the best represented multi group from Guimarota). These teeth also have more cusps, which are arranged in two rows. (Hahn & Hahn 2000, p. 106).
