= Cambelodon =

Cambelodon Temporal range: Tithonian

Scientific classification
- Kingdom: Animalia
- Phylum: Chordata
- Class: Mammalia
- Order: †Multituberculata
- Family: †Pinheirodontidae
- Genus: †Cambelodon
- Species: †C. torreensis

Binomial name
- †Cambelodon torreensis Carvalho et al., 2025

Extinct genus of mammals

Cambelodon is an extinct genus of pinheirodontid multituberculate that lived during the Tithonian stage of the Late Jurassic epoch.

== Distribution ==
Cambelodon torreensis is known from the Freixial Formation of Portugal.
