= Peparethus =

Peparethus or Peparethos (Ancient Greek: Πεπάρηθος), may refer to:

- Peparethus, the ancient name of the island of Skopelos and one of the towns on the island, the modern Skopelos (town)
- Peparethus, the son of the god Dionysus and Ariadne
- Peparethos, one of the three species of Plesiochoffatia
