= Uzbekbaatar =

Uzbekbaatar Temporal range: Late Cretaceous

Scientific classification
- Kingdom: Animalia
- Phylum: Chordata
- Class: Mammalia
- Order: †Multituberculata
- Suborder: †Cimolodonta
- Genus: †Uzbekbaatar; Kielan-Jaworowska & Nessov, 1992

Species
- U. kizylkumensis Kielan-Jaworowska & Nessov, 1992 (type species); U. wardi Averianov, 1999

Extinct family of mammals

Uzbekbaatar is a genus of extinct mammal from the Upper Cretaceous of Uzbekistan. It was a member of the extinct order Multituberculata within the suborder Cimolodonta, though its further affinities are unclear. The genus was named by Zofia Kielan-Jaworowska and Lev Nessov in 1992 and means "Uzbek hero".

The one species named by Kielan-Jaworowska and Nessov is Uzbekbaatar kizylkumensis, found in the Upper Cretaceous strata of Uzbekistan. A second species, Uzbekbaatar wardi, was described by Averianov in 1999.
