= Iberodon =

Iberodon Temporal range: Early Cretaceous

Scientific classification
- Kingdom: Animalia
- Phylum: Chordata
- Class: Mammalia
- Order: †Multituberculata
- Family: †Pinheirodontidae
- Genus: †Iberodon
- Species: †I. quadrituberculatus

Binomial name
- †Iberodon quadrituberculatus G. Hahn & R. Hahn, 1999

Extinct species of mammal

Iberodon is a small, extinct mammal of the Lower Cretaceous from Portugal. It was a member of the also extinct order Multituberculata, and led its obscure and plant-eating existence in the company of dinosaurs. It lies within the suborder "Plagiaulacida" and family Pinheirodontidae.

The genus Iberodon was named by Hahn G. and Hahn R. in 1999 based on a single species. The species, known as Iberodon quadrituberculatus, is known from teeth found in Berriasian (Lower Cretaceous)-age strata of Portugal.
