= Ameribaatar =

Ameribaatar Temporal range: Late Cretaceous

Scientific classification
- Domain: Eukaryota
- Kingdom: Animalia
- Phylum: Chordata
- Class: Mammalia
- Order: †Multituberculata
- Family: †incertae sedis
- Genus: †Ameribaatar; Eaton and Cifelli, 2001

Species
- A. zofiae Eaton and Cifelli, 2001 (type)

Extinct family of mammals

Ameribaatar is an extinct mammal of the Late Cretaceous. It was a member of the also extinct order of Multituberculata. It lived in North America during the Mesozoic, also known as the "age of the dinosaurs". Whether it belongs to Plagiaulacida, Cimolodonta, or neither, is unclear. The genus Ameribaatar ("American hero") was named by Eaton and Cifelli in 2001.

The type species is Ameribaatar zofiae. Its fossil remains were discovered in strata dating to the Albian-Cenomanian boundary (also the Lower-Upper Cretaceous boundary) in the Cedar Mountain Formation, Utah (USA).

The species name honours Zofia Kielan-Jaworowska.
