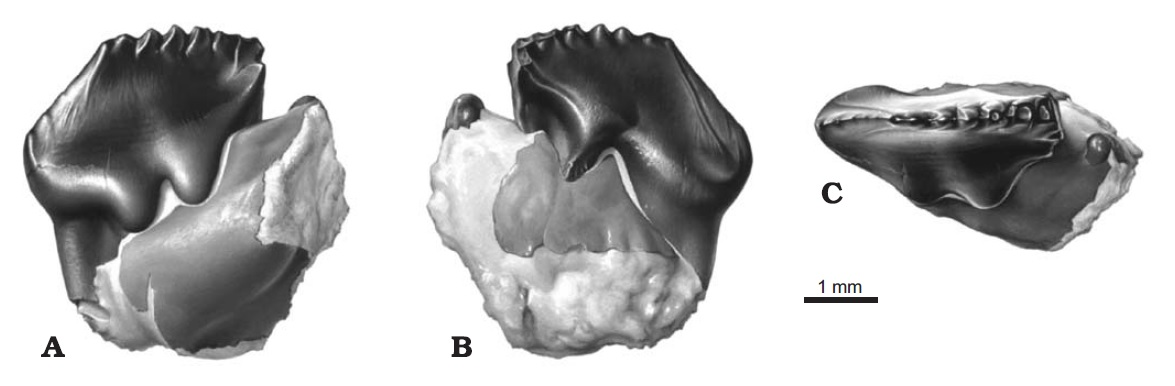
- Three views of the holotype tooth
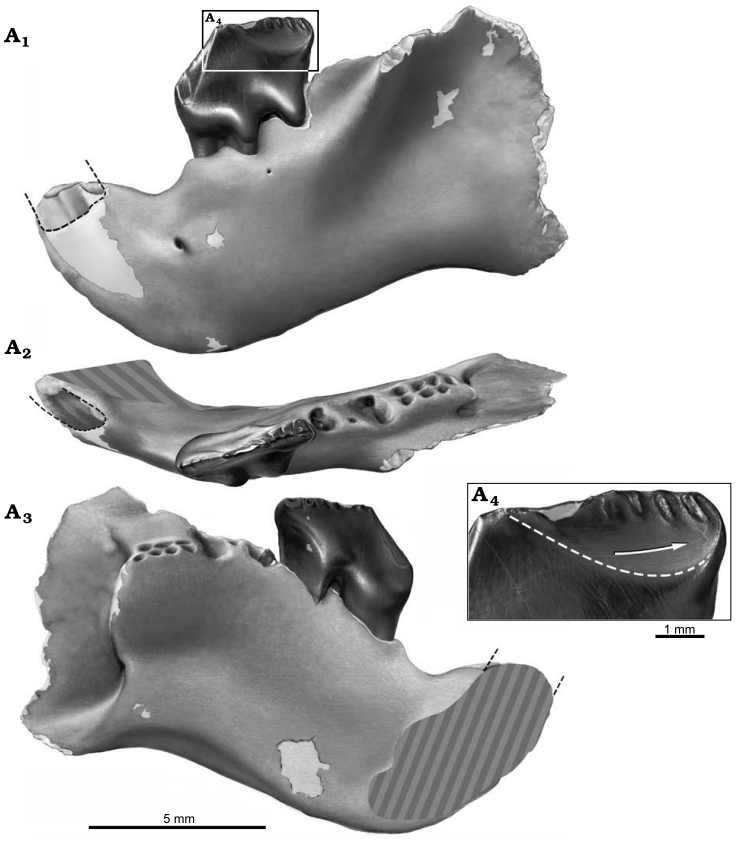
- Reconstruction of the referred jaw

Scientific classification
- Domain: Eukaryota
- Kingdom: Animalia
- Phylum: Chordata
- Class: Mammalia
- Order: †Multituberculata
- Suborder: †Cimolodonta
- Family: †Corriebaataridae; Rich et al., 2009
- Genus: †Corriebaatar; Rich et al., 2009
- Species: †C. marywaltersae

Binomial name
- †Corriebaatar marywaltersae Rich et al., 2009

= Corriebaatar =

Corriebaatar Temporal range: latest Barremian 125 Ma

Extinct genus of mammals

Corriebaatar is an extinct genus of multituberculate mammals. It contains the single species Corriebaatar marywaltersae and represents the first evidence of Australian multituberculates. It is known from fossils found in the Wonthaggi Formation date back to the Early Cretaceous (latest Barremian ~ 125 million years ago).

== Discovery ==
The species Corriebaatar marywaltersae was discovered in 2009 based on the discovery of a well-preserved fourth premolar found in Victoria, Australia at the Flat Rocks fossil site. It was hypothesized to represent a cimolodontan multituberculate mammal as opposed to a new, unrecognized lineage. The 2009 specimen was the holotype and the only known remains of the species until a second specimen of C. marywaltersae was discovered at the same site and described in 2022. The second specimen was two pieces of the lower jawbone that preserved both the fourth premolar and the first and second molars.

== Taxonomy ==
It is placed as the only member of the family Corriebaataridae. Corriebaatar was placed in the 2022 study as a derived multituberculate belonging to Cimolodonta, and possibly closely related to Ferugliotherium from the Late Cretaceous of Argentina.

== See also ==
- 2009 in paleontology
