= Viridomys =

Viridomys Temporal range: Late Cretaceous

Scientific classification
- Kingdom: Animalia
- Phylum: Chordata
- Class: Mammalia
- Order: †Multituberculata
- Genus: †Viridomys
- Species: †V. orbatus

Binomial name
- †Viridomys orbatus Fox R.C., 1971

Genus of mammals

Viridomys is a genus of extinct mammal from the Upper Cretaceous of North America. It was a member of the extinct order of Multituberculata, and lived during the Mesozoic, also known as the "age of the dinosaurs." It's within the suborder of Cimolodonta, though its further affinities are unclear.

The primary species, Viridomys orbatus, is known from fossils found in Campanian (Upper Cretaceous)-aged strata of the Upper Milk River Formation in Alberta, Canada. Possible remains have also been found in Dogie Mountain, Texas (United States). The Texas site is believed to be Paleocene in age.
