= Gerhardodon =

Gerhardodon Temporal range: Berriasian

Scientific classification
- Domain: Eukaryota
- Kingdom: Animalia
- Phylum: Chordata
- Class: Mammalia
- Order: †Multituberculata
- Family: †Pinheirodontidae
- Genus: †Gerhardodon
- Species: †G. purbeckensis

Binomial name
- †Gerhardodon purbeckensis Kielan-Jaworowska & Ensom, 1992

Extinct family of mammals

Gerhardodon is an extinct genus of mammal from the Lower Cretaceous of southern England. It was a member of the also extinct order of Multituberculata, and lived with such dinosaurs as Iguanodon. It lies within the suborder "Plagiaulacida" and family Pinheirodontidae.

The genus Gerhardodon ("Gerhard’s tooth") was named by Kielan-Jaworowska Z. and Ensom P.C. in 1992 based on a single species, Gerhardodon purbeckensis. It is known from the Berriasian (Lower Cretaceous) strata of Durlston Bay in Dorset, England. It is a multituberculate mammal from the Isle of Purbeck, Dorset. This formation is sometimes considered to be partly Upper Jurassic.
