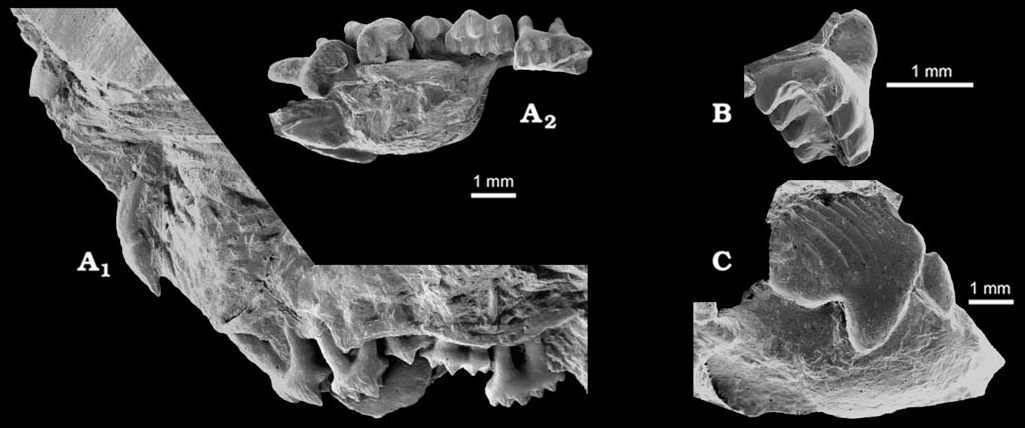
- Casts of the holotype

Scientific classification
- Kingdom: Animalia
- Phylum: Chordata
- Class: Mammalia
- Order: †Multituberculata
- Family: †Eobaataridae
- Genus: †Hakusanobaatar; Kusuhashi, 2008

Species
- H. matsuoi Kusuhashi, 2008 (type)

= Hakusanobaatar =

Hakusanobaatar Temporal range: Early Cretaceous

Extinct genus of mammals

Hakusanobaatar is an extinct genus of eobaatarid multituberculate that existed in Japan during the early Cretaceous.
