= Albionbaataridae =

Albionbaataridae Temporal range: Late Jurassic - Early Cretaceous

Scientific classification
- Domain: Eukaryota
- Kingdom: Animalia
- Phylum: Chordata
- Class: Mammalia
- Order: †Multituberculata
- Suborder: †Plagiaulacida
- Family: †Albionbaataridae

Genera
- ? Kielanobaatar; Albionbaatar; Proalbionbaatar

Extinct family of mammals

Albionbaataridae is a family of small, extinct mammals within the order Multituberculata. Fossil remains are known from the Upper Jurassic and Lower Cretaceous of Europe and Asia. These herbivores lived their obscure lives during the Mesozoic, also known as the "age of the dinosaurs." They were among the more derived representatives of the informal suborder "Plagiaulacida". The taxon Albionbaataridae was named by Kielan-Jaworowska Z. and Ensom P.C. in 1994.

Members of Albionbaataridae were "Shrew-sized taxa that differ from all other multituberculates in having relatively flat, multi-cusped anterior upper premolars, with 10-14 cusps arranged in three rows, rather than 3-4, rarely up to nine high cusps in two rows, and in having lingual slope of all premolars covered by prominent, subparallel ridges...," (Kielan-Jaworowska & Hurum, 2001, p. 414).
