= Liaobaatar =

Liaobaatar Temporal range: Aptian–Albian

Scientific classification
- Kingdom: Animalia
- Phylum: Chordata
- Class: Mammalia
- Order: †Multituberculata
- Family: †Eobaataridae
- Genus: †Liaobaatar; Kusuhasi et al., 2009
- Species: †L. changi

Binomial name
- †Liaobaatar changi Kusuhasi et al., 2009

Extinct genus of mammals

Liaobaatar is an extinct genus of multituberculate mammal known from the lower Cretaceous of what is now China. The genus contains a single species, Liaobaatar changi.

== Etymology ==
The generic name Liaobaatar indicates the site where the material referred to this genus has been discovered, the Province of Liaoning in China, plus the Mongolian suffix "baatar", meaning 'hero', often used for multituberculate genus names.
