= Eobaatar =

Eobaatar Temporal range: Aptian–Albian

Scientific classification
- Kingdom: Animalia
- Phylum: Chordata
- Class: Mammalia
- Order: †Multituberculata
- Family: †Eobaataridae
- Genus: †Eobaatar; Kielan-Jaworowska, Dashzeveg and Trofimov, 1987

Type species
- †Eobaatar magnus Kielan-Jaworowska, Dashzeveg and Trofimov, 1987

Synonyms
- Eobataar (lapsus calami)

Extinct family of mammals

Eobaatar is a genus of extinct mammal from the Lower Cretaceous of Mongolia. A member of the also extinct order Multituberculata, it lies within the suborder Plagiaulacida and family Eobaataridae. The genus Eobaatar was named by Kielan-Jaworowska Z., Dashzeveg D. and Trofimov B.A. in 1987. Its name was made from Greek "eos" = "dawn" and Mongolian "baatar" = "hero"", "warrior".

== Species ==
Five species have been described, but as of 2021 only the type species E. magnus is valid.

=== Eobaatar magnus ===
This species was named by Kielan-Jaworowska Z., Dashzeveg D. and Trofimov B.A. in 1987. It is based on a fragment of lower jaw with teeth found in Aptian or Albian (Lower Cretaceous) strata of the Dzunbain Formation in Guchin Us County, Mongolia.

=== "Eobaatar" hispanicus ===
This species was named by Hahn G. and Hahn R. in 1992. Remains consisting of a single tooth were found in Hauterivian - Barremian (Lower Cretaceous)-age strata of the Camarillas Formation, Spain. In 2021 review, it is considered as an eobaatarid but certainly not member of genus Eobaatar.

=== "Eobaatar" minor ===
This species was also named by Kielan-Jaworowska Z., Dashzeveg D. and Trofimov B.A. in 1987. Remains were found in Lower Cretaceous Dzunbain Formation of Mongolia. Going by the species name, it was probably relatively small. It got own genus Nokerbaatar in 2021.

=== "Eobaatar" pajaronensis ===
This species was named by Hahn G. and Hahn R. in 2001. Remains were discovered in Barremian (Lower Cretaceous) strata of the Camarillas Formation in Spain. 2021 review considered that known remains are not diagnostic and attribution to this genus is not confirmed.

=== "Eobaatar" clemensi ===
This species was named by Steven Sweetman in 2009. Remains were found in the Barremian (lower Cretaceous) of the Wessex formation, England. In 2021 review, it is considered as an eobaatarid but certainly not member of genus Eobaatar.

== Sources ==
- Zofia Kielan-Jaworowska, Richard L. Cifelli, and Zhe-Xi Luo (2004). "Mammals from the age of dinosaurs : origins, evolution, and structure" pp. 260–342. ISBN 0-231-11918-6
- Hahn & Hahn (2001), "Multituberculaten-zähne aus der Unter-Kreide (Barremium) von Ple Pajaron (Prov. Cuenca, Spanien)". Paläontologische Zeitschrift 74 (4), p. 587-589.
- Kielan-Jaworowska et al. (1987), "Early Cretaceous multituberculates from Mongolia and a comparison with Late Jurassic form". Acta Palaeontologica Polonica 32, p. 3-47.
- Kielan-Jaworowska Z & Hurum JH (2001), "Phylogeny and Systematics of multituberculate mammals". Paleontology 44, p. 389-429.
- Much of this information has been derived from MESOZOIC MAMMALS: Plagiaulacidae, Albionbaataridae, Eobaataridae & Arginbaataridae
- S. C. Sweetman. 2009. A new species of the plagiaulacoid multituberculate mammal Eobaatar from the Early Cretaceous of southern Britain. Acta Palaeontologica Polonica 54(3):373-384
