= Pseudobolodon =

Pseudobolodon Temporal range: Late Jurassic

Scientific classification
- Kingdom: Animalia
- Phylum: Chordata
- Class: Mammalia
- Order: †Multituberculata
- Suborder: †Plagiaulacida
- Genus: †Pseudobolodon; G. Hahn, 1977

Species
- P. krebsi; P. oreas

Extinct order of mammals

Pseudobolodon was a relatively early member of the also extinct order of mammals, Multituberculata. It lived in Portugal during the Upper Jurassic, part of the "age of the dinosaurs." It lies within the suborder "Plagiaulacida" and family Paulchoffatiidae.

The genus Pseudobolodon ("false Bolodon") was named by Hahn G. in 1977 based on two species. A third one-time species, P. robustus (Hahn, 1978), seems to have transformed into Meketibolodon robustus (Hahn G. 1978).

The species Pseudobolodon krebsi was named by Hahn G. & Hahn R. in 1994. Fossil remains consisting of two upper jaws have been found in the Kimmeridgian (Upper Jurassic)-age strata of Guimarota, Portugal. As for the septomaxilla mentioned in the title of the reference: "A small, triangular bone is placed between the premaxilla and the maxilla; this bone is interpreted as a septomaxilla. This is a bone that is typical for lower tetrapods (amphibians, reptiles), but is usually absent in mammals", (Hahn & Hahn 2000, p. 98). The premaxilla is the front bit of your upper jaw, while the maxilla is the side of it. Like other existing mammals, humans don't have this septomaxilla.

The species Pseudobolodon oreas was named by Hahn G. in 1977. Remains consisting of seven upper jaws have been found in Kimmeridgian (Upper Jurassic)-age strata of Guimarota, Portugal.
