= Kuehneodon =

Kuehneodon Temporal range: Late Jurassic 155–150 Ma

Scientific classification
- Kingdom: Animalia
- Phylum: Chordata
- Class: Mammalia
- Order: †Multituberculata
- Family: †Paulchoffatiidae
- Genus: †Kuehneodon; G. Hahn, 1969

Species
- K. barcasensis K. dietrichi K. dryas K. hahni K. guimarotensis K. simpsoni K. uniradiculatus

Extinct family of mammals

Kuehneodon is a genus of extinct mammal of the Upper Jurassic - Lower Cretaceous of Europe. It was a relatively early member of the also extinct order of Multituberculata. Members of this genus lived alongside such dinosaurs as Allosaurus. It belongs to the suborder "Plagiaulacida", family Paulchoffatiidae. In addition, this genus is the only known member of a subfamily called Kuehneodontinae. It was named by Hahn G. in 1969, the name meaning "Kühne’s tooth" in honor of paleontologist Walther Kühne, pioneer of the Guimarota site of Portugal where remains were found in the late 1950s and early 1960s.

Kuehneodon is the one genus of the taxon Paulchoffatiidae from the Guimarota site whereby the lower and upper jaws have been found united. These "exhibit the lowest number of derived characters (apomorphies), and are thus closest to the main evolutionary lineage of the multituberculates" (Hahn & Hahn 2000, p. 106).

The genus is based mainly upon remains of jaw, a number of species are recorded from Guimarota: Kuehneodon dietrichi Hahn G, 1969; K. dryas Hahn G, 1977; K. guimarotensis Hahn G, 1969; K. simpsoni Hahn, 1969 and K. uniradiculatus Hahn, 1978. A further Upper Jurassic, Portuguese locality near Lourinhã, Porto das Barcas, has yielded K. barcasensis Hahn G & Hahn R, 2001. Lower Cretaceous fossils have also been found in Galve, Spain. K. hahni Antunes, 1998 was reported from Paimogo, Lourinhã, by Miguel Telles Antunes.
