= Lavocatia =

Lavocatia Temporal range: Early Cretaceous

Scientific classification
- Kingdom: Animalia
- Phylum: Chordata
- Class: Mammalia
- Order: †Multituberculata
- Family: †Pinheirodontidae
- Genus: †Lavocatia
- Species: †L. alfambrensis

Binomial name
- †Lavocatia alfambrensis Canudo J.I. and Cuenca G., 1996

Extinct family of mammals

Lavocatia is a genus of extinct mammal from the Lower Cretaceous of Spain. It was a member of the also extinct order Multituberculata, and lived alongside of dinosaurs. Like most Mesozoic mammals, it was a shrewish-sized animal. It's in the suborder "Plagiaulacida" and family Pinheirodontidae. The genus Lavocatia was named by J. I. Canudo and G. Cuenca in 1996 based on a single tooth, with the generic name in honor of French paleontologist René Lavocat and the specific epithet a reference to the town of Alfambra.

The species Lavocatia alfambrensis is known from the Barremian-age Camarillas Formation of Galve, Spain. This genus is apparently differentiated by the number of cusps on the tooth; 15. Also referred to in the reference is Peramura. This was a more "advanced" group of mammals, possibly ancestral to ourselves (see Peramus).
