= Janumys =

Janumys Temporal range: middle Cretaceous

Scientific classification
- Domain: Eukaryota
- Kingdom: Animalia
- Phylum: Chordata
- Class: Mammalia
- Order: †Multituberculata
- Suborder: †Plagiaulacida
- Family: †incertae sedis
- Genus: †Janumys; Eaton and Cifelli, 2001

Species
- J. erebos Eaton and Cifelli, 2001 (type)

Extinct family of mammals

Janumys is a genus of extinct mammal of the middle Cretaceous. It was a member of the order of Multituberculata (also extinct). It lived in North America during the Mesozoic era, also known as the "age of the reptiles." It has been provisionally placed within the informal suborder "Plagiaulacida".

The type species, Janumys erebos, was found in the Albian-Cenomanian, Lower-Upper Cretaceous boundary of the Cedar Mountain Formation in Utah (United States).
