= Xenachoffatia =

Xenachoffatia oinopion Temporal range: Jurassic

Scientific classification
- Kingdom: Animalia
- Phylum: Chordata
- Class: Mammalia
- Order: †Multituberculata
- Genus: †Xenachoffatia
- Species: †X. oinopion

Binomial name
- †Xenachoffatia oinopion G. Hahn & R. Hahn, 1998

Extinct species of mammal

Xenachoffatia is a small Jurassic mammal from Portugal. It was a relatively early member of the also extinct order of Multituberculata. It lived during "the age of the dinosaurs" and belongs to the suborder Plagiaulacida, family Paulchoffatiidae.

The genus Xenachoffatia ("for Xena Choffat") was named by Hahn G. and Hahn R. in 1998. The primary species Xenachoffatia oinopion (Hahn & Hahn, 1998) was found in Kimmeridgian (Upper Jurassic) Camadas de Guimarota of Guimarota, Portugal. The classification is based on three upper molars.
