= Monobaatar =

Monobaatar Temporal range: Early Cretaceous

Scientific classification
- Kingdom: Animalia
- Phylum: Chordata
- Class: Mammalia
- Order: †Multituberculata
- Family: †Eobaataridae
- Genus: †Monobaatar
- Species: †M. mimicus

Binomial name
- †Monobaatar mimicus Kielan-Jaworowska, Dashzeveg & Trofimov, 1987

Genus of mammals

Monobaatar is a genus of extinct mammal from the Lower Cretaceous of Mongolia. It was within the also extinct order Multituberculata, and lived during the "age of the dinosaurs". It is also within the suborder "Plagiaulacida" and has been tentatively referred to the family Eobaataridae, though it probably is not a member.

The genus Monobaatar (Kielan-Jaworowska, Dashzeveg & Trofimov, 1987) is known from the species Monobaatar mimicus, which itself is very poorly known. Fossil remains come from the Lower Cretaceous Dzunbain Formation of Mongolia.
