= Bathmochoffatia =

Bathmochoffatia Temporal range: Late Jurassic

Scientific classification
- Kingdom: Animalia
- Phylum: Chordata
- Class: Mammalia
- Order: †Multituberculata
- Family: †Paulchoffatiidae
- Genus: †Bathmochoffatia; G. Hahn & R. Hahn, 1998

Species
- B. hapax

Extinct family of mammals

Bathmochoffatia is an extinct mammal of the Upper Jurassic. It was a relatively early member of the also extinct order Multituberculata. It lived in Portugal at about the same time as the far more famous dinosaur, Allosaurus. It is in the suborder "Plagiaulacida", family Paulchoffatiidae. The genus Bathmochoffatia (basal choffatia) was named by Hahn G. and Hahn R. in 1998.

The primary species, Bathmochoffatia hapax, was also named by Hahn and Hahn. Fossil remains were found in strata dating to the Kimmeridgian (Upper Jurassic) of Guimarota, Portugal. Remains consist of a solitary molar and one cheek tooth.
