= Pinheirodon =

Pinheirodon Temporal range: Early Cretaceous

Scientific classification
- Domain: Eukaryota
- Kingdom: Animalia
- Phylum: Chordata
- Class: Mammalia
- Order: †Multituberculata
- Family: †Pinheirodontidae
- Genus: †Pinheirodon

Species
- P. pygmaeus; P. vastus

Extinct family of mammals

Pinheirodon is a genus of extinct mammal from Portugal. It is a member of the also extinct order of Multituberculata, and shared the world with dinosaurs. It is placed in the suborder "Plagiaulacida" and family Pinheirodontidae.

The species on which the genus is based has been designated as Pinheirodon sp. It is known from isolated fossil teeth.

Initially considered Early Cretaceous, Pinheirodon is from the locality of Porto Dinheiro (Lourinhã, Portugal) which is Late Jurassic (Tithonian).
