= Dzunbain Formation =

Early Cretaceous geologic formation in Mongolia

- Stratigraphic range: Aptian–Albian
- Type: Geological formation
- Sub-units: Chamrin-Us Member; Khovboor Member
- Thickness: up to 60 metres (200 ft) at Chamrin-Us

Lithology
- Primary: Claystone and sandstone

Location
- Coordinates: 42.45°N 102.417°E
- Region: Erdene District, Dornogovi Province, Mongolia
- Country: Mongolia

The Dzunbain Formation (also known as Dzunbayn Formation) is a geological formation in Mongolia, dating to the Early Cretaceous (Aptian-Albian). The formation contains fossils of mammals, reptiles, turtles and dinosaurs. The Dzunbain Formation is equivalent to the Khuren Dukh Formation.

== Paleobiota of the Dzunbain Formation ==
=== Amphibians ===
Genus	Species	Location	Stratigraphic position	Material	Notes	Image
Eodiscoglossus	E. sp.	Khovboor				

=== Squamates ===
Genus	Species	Location	Stratigraphic position	Material	Notes	Image
Dorsetisaurus	D. sp.	Khovboor				
Hoburogekko	H. suchanovi	Khovboor		"A partial skull."		
Hodzhakulia	H. sp.	Khovboor				
Iguania	Indeterminate	Khovboor				
Lacertilia	Indeterminate	Khovboor				
Paramacellodidae	Indeterminate	Khovboor				
Priscagamidae	Indeterminate	Khovboor				
Slavoia	S. sp.	Khovboor				
Xantusiidae	Indeterminate	Khovboor				
Xenosauridae	Indeterminate	Khovboor				

=== Mammals ===
Genus	Species	Location	Stratigraphic position	Material	Notes	Image
Arginbaatar	A. dimitrievae	Khovboor				
Arguimus	A. khosbajari	Khovboor				
Eobaatar	E. magnus and E. minor	Khovboor		"Lower jaw fragment (E. magnus)."		
Gobiconodon	G. borissiaki and G. hobuvensis	Khovboor		"Both species known only from cranial remains."		
Gobiotheriodon	G. infinitus	Khovboor			Previously known as "Gobiodon".	
Heptoconodon	Indeterminate	Khovboor				
Hovurlestes	H. noyon	Khovboor				
Kielantherium	K. gobiensis	Khovboor				
Monobaatar	M. mimicus	Khovboor				
Prokennolestes	P. minor, P. sp. and P. trofimovi	Khovboor				
Plagiaulacidae	Indeterminate	Khovboor				

=== Turtles ===
Genus	Species	Location	Stratigraphic position	Material	Notes	Image
Hangaiemys	H. hoburensis	Khovboor				
Mongolemys	M. sp.	Khovboor				

=== Dinosaurs ===
Genus	Species	Location	Stratigraphic position	Material	Notes	Image
Mongolostegus	M. exspectabilis	Chamrin-Us		"Posterior dorsal and anterior caudal vertebrae as well as pelvic material."	Previously known as Wuerhosaurus mongoliensis. One of the last surviving stegosaurs.	
Psittacosauridae	Indeterminate	Chamrin-Us				
Psittacosaurus	P. mongoliensis	Khovboor				
Sauropoda	Indeterminate	Chamrin-Us and Khovboor				
Shamosaurus	S. scutatus	Chamrin-Us and Khovboor		"A complete skull, lower jaws and partial postcranial skeleton with armor. Also referred are a skull piece, lower jaw and two cervical halfrings."		
Stegosauridae	Indeterminate	Chamrin-Us			One of the last surviving stegosaurs.	
Troodontidae	Indeterminate	Chamrin-Us				

== See also ==
- List of dinosaur-bearing rock formations
