= Henkelodon =

Henkelodon Temporal range: Kimmeridgian ~155–150 Ma

Scientific classification
- Kingdom: Animalia
- Phylum: Chordata
- Class: Mammalia
- Order: †Multituberculata
- Family: †Paulchoffatiidae
- Genus: †Henkelodon
- Species: †H. naias

Binomial name
- †Henkelodon naias G. Hahn, 1977

Extinct species of mammal

Henkelodon was a small mammal of the Upper Jurassic. It was a relatively early member of the extinct order Multituberculata. Henkelodon was a European herbivore that lived during the "age of the dinosaurs". It lies within the suborder "Plagiaulacida" and family Paulchoffatiidae.

The genus Henkelodon ("Henkel's tooth") was named by Hahn G. in 1977 based on a single species.

Fossil remains of the species Henkelodon naias were discovered in the Kimmeridgian (Upper Jurassic)-age Alcobaça Formation of Guimarota, Portugal. The remains consisted of one upper jaw. According to Kielan-Jaworowska and Hurum, 2001, (p. 413), this genus was named in 1987. However, Hahn and Hahn 2000 (p. 105) supports 1977.
