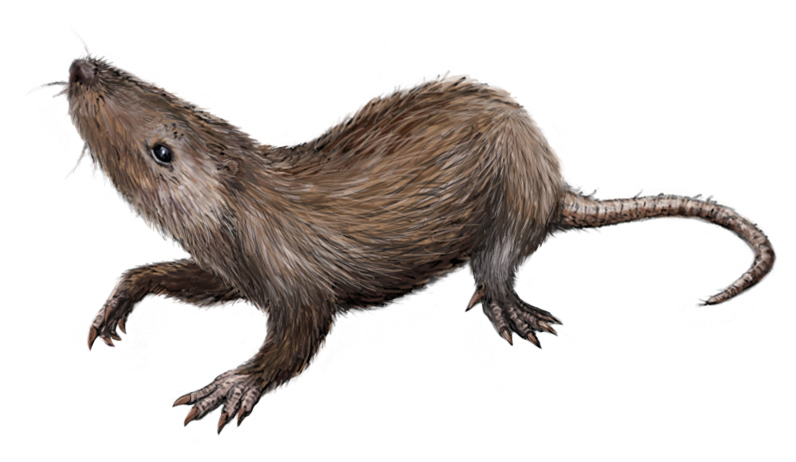
- Restoration

Scientific classification
- Domain: Eukaryota
- Kingdom: Animalia
- Phylum: Chordata
- Class: Mammalia
- Order: †Multituberculata
- Family: †Paulchoffatiidae
- Subfamily: †Paulchoffatiinae
- Genus: †Sunnyodon
- Species: †S. notleyi

Binomial name
- †Sunnyodon notleyi Kielan-Jaworowska & Ensom, 1992

= Sunnyodon =

Sunnyodon Temporal range: Early Cretaceous Berriasian

Genus of mammals

Sunnyodon is a genus of tiny, extinct mammal, probably of the Lower Cretaceous. Found in what is now southern England and Denmark, it was a relatively early member of the extinct order of Multituberculata. It is part of the suborder Plagiaulacida and family Paulchoffatiidae.

The genus Sunnyodon (meaning "Sunny tooth", after Sunnydown Farm) was named by Zofia Kielan-Jaworowska and Ensom P.C. in 1992 based on a single specimen.

Fossil remains of the species Sunnyodon notleyi Lower Cretaceous-age strata of the Lulworth Formation in Durlston Bay, Dorset, England and the Rabekke Formation in Denmark. This is a tooth-based species.

A tooth from the Danish island of Bornholm was assigned to Sunnyodon in 2004. It is the first fossil of a Mesozoic mammal found in Scandinavia. A tooth has also been assigned to Sunnyodon from the Berriasian aged Angeac-Charente bonebed in France.

== Sources ==
- Kielan-Jaworowska & Ensom (1992), "Multituberculate Mammals from the Upper Jurassic Purbeck Limestone Formation of southern England", Paleontology, 35, p. 95-126.
- Kielan-Jaworowska, Z. & Hurum, J.H. (2001), "Phylogeny and Systematics of multituberculate mammals", Paleontology 44, p. 389-429.
