= Ecprepaulax =

Ecprepaulax Temporal range: Early Cretaceous

Scientific classification
- Kingdom: Animalia
- Phylum: Chordata
- Class: Mammalia
- Order: †Multituberculata
- Family: †Pinheirodontidae
- Genus: †Ecprepaulax
- Species: †E. anomala

Binomial name
- †Ecprepaulax anomala G. Hahn & R. Hahn, 1999

Species of mammal

Ecprepaulax is a Lower Cretaceous mammal from Portugal. It was a member of the also extinct order Multituberculata and shared the world with dinosaurs. It lies within the suborder "Plagiaulacida" and family Pinheirodontidae.

The genus Ecprepaulax was named by Hahn G. and Hahn R. in 1999 based on a single species Ecprepaulax anomala Fossil remains were found in Berriasian (Lower Cretaceous) strata in Portugal. The species is a multituberculate mammal within the informal suborder of "Plagiaulacida".
