= Iberica (mammal) =

Iberica Temporal range: Early Cretaceous, 130 Ma

Scientific classification
- Kingdom: Animalia
- Phylum: Chordata
- Class: Mammalia
- Order: †Multituberculata
- Family: †Eobaataridae (?)
- Genus: †Iberica; Badiola et al., 2011

Species
- I. hahni Badiola et al., 2011 (type)

Extinct genus of mammals

Iberica is an extinct genus of eobaatarid or a possible plagiaulacid multituberculate which existed in what is now Galve, Spain, during the early Cretaceous (late Hauterivian-early Barremian age). It was first named by Ainara Badiola, José Ignacio Canudo and Gloria Cuenca-Bescós in 2011 and the type species is Iberica hahni.
