= Kielanodon =

Kielanodon Temporal range: Late Jurassic

Scientific classification
- Kingdom: Animalia
- Phylum: Chordata
- Class: Mammalia
- Order: †Multituberculata
- Family: †Paulchoffatiidae
- Genus: †Kielanodon; G. Hahn, 1987

Species
- K. hopsoni others

Extinct family of mammals

Kielanodon is an extinct mammal of the Portuguese Upper Jurassic. It was a relatively early member of the also extinct order of Multituberculata. It eked out a living during the Mesozoic era, also known as the "Age of the Dinosaurs." It is in the suborder Plagiaulacida, family Paulchoffatiidae.

The genus Kielanodon, meaning "Kielan’s tooth" after Zofia Kielan-Jaworowska, was named by Hahn G. in 1987. The main species, Kielanodon hopsoni, also named by Hahn, is known from fossils found in the Kimmeridgian (Upper Jurassic)-age strata of Guimarota, Portugal. The identification is based on three upper jaws.
