= Parendotherium =

Parendotherium Temporal range: Early Cretaceous, Barremian

Scientific classification
- Kingdom: Animalia
- Phylum: Chordata
- Class: Mammalia
- Order: †Multituberculata
- Family: †Paulchoffatiidae (?)
- Genus: †Parendotherium; Crusafont-Pairó & Adrover, 1966
- Species: †P. herreroi

Binomial name
- †Parendotherium herreroi Crusafont-Pairó & Adrover, 1966

Extinct genus of multituberculate

Parendotherium is an extinct genus of multituberculate mammal known from the Early Cretaceous (Barremian age) Camarillas Formation of Spain. The genus contains a single species, Parendotherium herreroi, known from an isolated tooth.

== Taxonomy ==
The genus Parendotherium was named by Crusafont-Pairó and Adrover in 1966. The known fossil remains of the type species, Parendotherium herreroi, were found in Barremian (Lower Cretaceous)-age strata of Galve, Spain. According to McKenna and Bell (1997, p. 37), Parendotherium is a junior synonym of Loxaulax. However, Kielan-Jaworowska and Hurum (2001, p. 415) lists it as a separate genus.

It has been variably classified within the families Paulchoffatiidae, Plagiaulacidae, and Eobaataridae, or considered a nomen dubium or synonym of Loxaulax. A 2021 publication noted the presence of a prominent basal cusp on the holotype, a characteristic of the upper incisor of paulchoffatiids unseen in eobaatarids, and concluded that paulchoffatiid affinities were most likely.
