= Albionbaatar =

Albionbaatar Temporal range: Early Cretaceous, Berriasian

Scientific classification
- Kingdom: Animalia
- Phylum: Chordata
- Class: Mammalia
- Order: †Multituberculata
- Family: †Albionbaataridae
- Genus: †Albionbaatar
- Species: †A. denisae

Binomial name
- †Albionbaatar denisae Kielan-Jaworowska and Ensom, 1994

Extinct species of mammal

Albionbaatar is an extinct mammal from the Lower Cretaceous Lulworth Formation of England. It was a member of the also extinct order Multituberculata and shared the world with the much larger dinosaurs. It is in the suborder "Plagiaulacida", family Albionbaataridae. The genus Albionbaatar was named by Z. Kielan-Jaworowska and P.C. Ensom in 1994 based on a single species.

"Albion" refers to England, while, "baatar" is Mongolian, meaning "hero". This is due to a recent nomenclatural tradition among specialists who study this group. Many multituberculates are called "something"-baatar, regardless of where they come from. This is in part because the best preserved remains of multis tend to come from the Upper Cretaceous of the Gobi desert.

The primary species, Albionbaatar denisae, also named by Kielan-Jaworowska and Ensom, was found in Berriasian (Lower Cretaceous) strata of Durlston Bay, in Dorset. It is a miniature multituberculate from the Isle of Purbeck.
