= Glirodon =

Glirodon Temporal range: Late Jurassic

Scientific classification
- Domain: Eukaryota
- Kingdom: Animalia
- Phylum: Chordata
- Class: Mammalia
- Order: †Multituberculata
- Suborder: †Plagiaulacida
- Family: †incertae sedis
- Genus: †Glirodon; Engelmann and Callison, 1999

Species
- G. grandis

Extinct family of mammals

Glirodon is a genus of extinct mammal from the Upper Jurassic. It was a relatively early member of the also-extinct order of Multituberculata, suborder "Plagiaulacida". These mammals lived in North America during the Mesozoic, also known as the "age of the dinosaurs".

The genus Glirodon has been described by Engelmann G.F. and Callison G. (1999) from a 'gliriform tooth'.

The species Glirodon grandis, also described by Engelmann and Callison, has been found in the Upper Jurassic formations of Dinosaur National Monument in Utah (United States). Other than being a large, early American Multituberculate, (see Multituberculata), the nature of this beast is somewhat unclear. It is an "allodontid (two families and the genus Glirodon)", (Kielan-Jaworowska and Hurum, 2001). It had gliriform incisors; incisors with the "enamel reduced to a stripe on the front side." Apparently, this condition evolved several times among Multituberculates.

It is based on a portion of snout. "Glirodon retains the plesiomorphic 'plagiaulacidan' ("Plagiaulacida") dental formula and shares with Allodontidae the structure of the upper premolars (Pl.1 fis 2-4). It differs from the Paulchoffatiidae and Plagiaulacidae in having a single-cusped I3," (Kielan-Jaworowska & Hurum, 2001, p. 401-402). I3 refers to an upper incisor and 'plesiomorphic' means 'basal'.

Present in stratigraphic zones 4 and 6.
