= Bernardodon =

Bernardodon Temporal range: Early Cretaceous

Scientific classification
- Kingdom: Animalia
- Phylum: Chordata
- Class: Mammalia
- Order: †Multituberculata
- Family: †Pinheirodontidae
- Genus: †Bernardodon
- Species: †B. atlanticus

Binomial name
- †Bernardodon atlanticus G. Hahn & R. Hahn, 1999

Extinct family of mammals

Bernardodon was a small, Lower Cretaceous mammal from Portugal. It is part of the extinct order Multituberculata, living at the same time as the dinosaurs. Differs from Pinheirodon in having I3 wider and more robust; on P5 the cusps of BB row do not extend for the whole tooth length.
