= Kielanobaatar =

Kielanobaatar Temporal range: Early Cretaceous

Scientific classification
- Domain: Eukaryota
- Kingdom: Animalia
- Phylum: Chordata
- Class: Mammalia
- Order: †Multituberculata
- Family: †Albionbaataridae (?)
- Genus: †Kielanobaatar; Kusuhashi et al., 2010

Species
- K. badaohaoensis Kusuhashi et al., 2010 (type)

Extinct genus of mammals

Kielanobaatar is an extinct genus of albionbaatarid multituberculate which existed in Shahai and Fuxin formations, northeastern China, during the early Cretaceous (Aptian/Albian age). It was first named by Nao Kusuhashi, Yaoming Hu, Yuanqing Wang, Takeshi Setoguchi and Hiroshige Marsuoka in 2010 and the type species is Kielanobaatar badaohaoensis, named after Zofia Kielan-Jaworowska, a leading specialist on Mesozoic mammals. It is known from a small fragment of the left lower jaw, including the third and fourth premolars, as well as two upper premolars. Kielanobaatar is the first record of an Asian albionbaatarid multituberculate. Since the albionbaataridae is known primarily from Europe, this discovery supports the idea of faunal exchange of terrestrial vertebrates between Europe and Asia in the Early Cretaceous.
