= Plesiochoffatia =

Plesiochoffatia Temporal range: Late Jurassic

Scientific classification
- Kingdom: Animalia
- Phylum: Chordata
- Class: Mammalia
- Order: †Multituberculata
- Family: †Paulchoffatiidae
- Genus: †Plesiochoffatia; G. Hahn & R. Hahn, 1999

Species
- P. peparethos; P. staphylos; P. thoas

Extinct family of mammals

Plesiochoffatia is an extinct mammal of the Upper Jurassic. It was a relatively early member of the also extinct order Multituberculata. It was a resident of Portugal during the "age of the dinosaurs." It's in the suborder "Plagiaulacida" and family Paulchoffatiidae.

The genus Plesiochoffatia ("near Choffatia") was named by Hahn G. and Hahn R. in 1999. It has also been known as Parachoffatia ("beside Choffatia") Hahn & Hahn, 1998 (preoccupied).

Remains have been found in the Kimmeridgian (Upper Jurassic)-age strata of Guimarota, Portugal. Three species were described in the same study under the name of Parachoffatia; (P. peparethos, P. staphylos and P. thoas). As something else had already been given that name, the genus was renamed a year later.
