= Zofiabaatar =

Zofiabaatar Temporal range: Late Jurassic

Scientific classification
- Domain: Eukaryota
- Kingdom: Animalia
- Phylum: Chordata
- Class: Mammalia
- Order: †Multituberculata
- Suborder: †Plagiaulacida
- Family: †Zofiabaataridae; Bakker, 1992
- Genus: †Zofiabaatar; Bakker & Carpenter, 1990

Species
- Zofiabaatar pulcher Bakker & Carpenter, 1990

Extinct genus of mammals

Zofiabaatar is a genus of extinct mammal from the Upper Jurassic period. It was a relatively early member of the extinct order Multituberculata within the suborder "Plagiaulacida". It lived in North America along with dinosaurs such as Diplodocus and Allosaurus.

The primary species is Zofiabaatar pulcher. Fossils have been found in the Upper Jurassic Morrison Formation of Wyoming (U.S.). The animal was reportedly about 30 cm (12 in) long. It seems to have been a rather specialized creature, judging by the dentary. Zofiabaataridae are believed to belong to the allodontid line.

It is present in stratigraphic zone 6.

The species is named after the Polish paleontologist Zofia Kielan-Jaworowska.
