= Zofia Kielan-Jaworowska =

Polish paleobiologist (1925–2015)

- Born: Zofia Kielan; 25 April 1925; Sokołów Podlaski, Poland
- Died: 13 March 2015 (aged 89); Warsaw, Poland
- Education: Warsaw University
- Spouse: Zbigniew Jaworowski (m. 1958)
- Awards: Romer-Simpson Medal (1995); Righteous Among the Nations (1999); Prize of the Foundation for Polish Science (2005)
- Scientific career
- Fields: Paleontology
- Workplaces: Polish Academy of Sciences
- Thesis: (1953)

Zofia Emilia Kielan-Jaworowska (25 April 1925 – 13 March 2015) was a Polish paleobiologist. In the mid-1960s, she led a series of Polish-Mongolian paleontological expeditions to the Gobi Desert. She was the first woman to serve on the executive committee of the International Union of Geological Sciences. The most notable dinosaur species she discovered include: Deinocheirus and Gallimimus while Kielanodon and Zofiabaatar were named in her honour.

In her obituary in Nature, Richard L. Cifelli wrote that "Much of what we know about the origin and early evolution of mammals stems, directly or indirectly, from [her work]".

== Early life and education ==
Zofia Kielan-Jaworowska was born in Sokołów Podlaski, Poland, on April 25, 1925. In 1928, her father, Franciszek Kielan, was offered a job for the Association of Agriculture and Trade Cooperatives in Warsaw, to which her family moved for five years. Zofia and family returned to Warsaw in 1934 and lived in Żoliborz - a borough of Warsaw. She began her studies in Warsaw, following the destruction after the war when the Nazis had attempted to completely destroy the city, resulting in the Department of Geology joining the ruins. She attended lectures given instead by the Polish paleontologist, Roman Kozłowski, in his own home. This is where her passion began. She subsequently earned a master's degree in zoology and a paleontology doctorate at Warsaw University, where she later became a professor. 15 years later, she organized the first Polish-Mongolian paleontological quest to the Gobi Desert, and returned seven times. She became the first woman to serve on the committee of the International Union of Geological Sciences. Her findings remain arguably unmatched by any living expert.

During World War II, together with her family, she helped to hide two Jewish women.

== Career and research ==
She was employed by the Institute of Paleobiology of the Polish Academy of Sciences. She held a number of functions in professional organizations in Poland and the United States.

Her work included the study of Devonian and Ordovician trilobites from Central Europe (Poland and Czech Republic), leading several Polish-Mongolian paleontological expeditions to the Gobi Desert, and the discovery of new species of crocodiles, lizards, turtles, dinosaurs (notably Deinocheirus), birds and multituberculates. She is the author of the book Hunting for Dinosaurs, and a co-author of the book Mammals from the Age of Dinosaurs.

Her work was published widely in peer reviewed scientific journals, books and monographs.

While at the University of Warsaw, she started her master's research. This allowed her to join expeditions with other paleontologists and make various contributions. Kielan-Jaworowska participated in her first paleontological excavation in 1947 along with a group of researchers from the Museum of Earth and the National Geological Institute. The excavations, led by the geologist Jan Czarnocki, took place in Poland's Świętokrzyskie Mountains in exposures of Middle Devonian strata. The group's work involved digging for soft rock and rinsing away the sediment, consisting of yellow marl, in running water while using a sieve to collect any fossils that were present. Kielan-Jaworowska spent two months with the group and specifically sought trilobite fossils, which became the focus of her master's thesis. She returned to specific sites in the Świętokrzyskie Mountains over the next three summers to continue developing her collection, which grew to over one hundred trilobite specimens.

Kielan-Jaworowska was awarded her master's degree in 1949. She had been employed as an assistant in the University of Warsaw's Department of Paleontology since fall 1948. She worked there until 1952, teaching classes in paleontology for biology and geology students.

During her expeditions from 1963 to 1971 to the Gobi Desert, she unearthed many dinosaurs and mammals from the Cretaceous and early Tertiary. Her findings were so extensive that, in 1965, her team had shipped over 20 tons of fossils back to Poland. One of her most notable finds was in 1971, when she discovered a Protoceratops and a young Velociraptor tangled in a struggle. The fossilization process of how these two remained intact in this position is still debated. Although her findings were mainly dinosaurs, she did not focus all her research on them. From 1949 to 1963, she concentrated on Paleozoic invertebrates, especially trilobites. They were among the oldest fossils commonly found. This led her to shift her focus on researching Mesozoic mammals in 1963.

Kielan-Jaworowska has added a great deal of contribution to monographs that detail findings of fossils and wrote her own book, Hunting for Dinosaurs, which give brief descriptions of her paleontological endeavors in the Gobi Desert. The book was written in Polish and translated to English and published in 1969. The book notes her exchange with the Mongolian people, as well as the hardships she faced to achieve success in her life's work. In her research, she explored the asteroid theory regarding the mass extinction of dinosaurs. Kielan-Jaworowska concluded the book with noting how the research of the mass extinctions could promote awareness for future decades. Kielan-Jaworowska and her book gained international attention and fame.

From 1960 to 1982, she was the director of the Institute of Paleobiology. In 1982, she stepped down from her position to undertake a visiting professorship at the Musée national d’Histoire naturelle in Paris, which lasted for two years. Soon after her return to Warsaw, she was appointed Professor of Paleontology at the University of Oslo, which lasted from 1986 to 1995 when she was appointed Professor Emerita in the institute of Paleobiology.

== Awards and honours ==
In 1988, she was awarded the Walter Granger Memorial Award.

In 1999, Kielan-Jaworowska received the Righteous Among the Nations Medal.

She was awarded the Romer-Simpson Medal in 1996, becoming the 8th recipient of the Society of Vertebrate Paleontology's award, which honors sustained and outstanding scholarly excellence in the discipline of vertebrate paleontology. In 2002, she also became the recipient of the Commander's Cross with Star of the Order of Polonia Restituta. Her book, Mammals from the Age of Dinosaurs, won her the prestigious Prize of the Foundation for Polish Science in 2005. Her work was recognized "for a creative synthesis of research on the Mesozoic evolution of mammals".

Kielan-Jaworowska's co-author, Zhe-Xi Lou, describes her contribution to paleontology as unmatched by any living experts, and that "in the whole of Mesozoic mammalian studies for the last 100 years, only the late American paleontologist George Gaylord Simpson would be her equal". "She is the rarest among the rare – she has been a leader in making important scientific contributions, and also a gregarious and charismatic figure, both of which have made paleontology a better science, and paleontologists worldwide a better community."

She was a member of the Polish Geological Society, Academia Europaea, Palaeontological Association, Norwegian Academy of Science and Letters, Norwegian Paleontological Society, Polish Academy of Sciences as well as an honorary member of the Linnean Society of London, Polish Copernicus Society of Naturalists and the Society of Vertebrate Paleontology. She worked at Harvard University (1973–74), Paris Diderot University (1982–84), University of Oslo (1987–95) and the Polish Academy of Sciences.

A number of extinct animals have been named in her honour including Kielanodon, Zofiabaatar, Kielantherium, Zofiagale as well as Indobaatar zofiae.

== Personal life ==
She married Zbigniew Jaworowski, a professor of radiobiology, in 1958.

== Books ==
- Kielan-Jaworowska, Z. (1974). Hunting for dinosaurs. Cambridge: MIT Press. ISBN 978-0-262-61007-0.
- Lillegraven, Jason A.; Kielan-Jaworowska, Zofia; Clemens, William A., eds. (1979). Mesozoic mammals : the first two-thirds of mammalian history. University of California Press. ISBN 978-0-520-03951-3.
- Kielan-Jaworowska, Zofia; Cifelli, Richard L.; Luo, Zhe-Xi (2004). Mammals from the age of dinosaurs : origins, evolution, and structure. Columbia University Press. ISBN 0-231-11918-6.
- Kielan-Jaworowska, Z. (2013). In pursuit of early mammals. Bloomington, Indiana: Indiana University Press. ISBN 978-0-253-00817-6.
