= Heishanobaatar =

Heishanobaatar Temporal range: Early Cretaceous

Scientific classification
- Kingdom: Animalia
- Phylum: Chordata
- Class: Mammalia
- Order: †Multituberculata
- Family: †Eobaataridae
- Genus: †Heishanobaatar; Kusuhashi et al., 2010
- Species: †H. triangulus

Binomial name
- †Heishanobaatar triangulus Kusuhashi et al., 2010

Extinct genus of mammals

Heishanobaatar is an extinct genus of eobaatarid multituberculate which existed in Shahai and Fuxin formations, northeastern China, during the early Cretaceous (Aptian/Albian age). It was first named by Nao Kusuhashi, Yaoming Hu, Yuanqing Wang, Takeshi Setoguchi and Hiroshige Marsuoka in 2010 and the type species is Heishanobaatar triangulus. Known from dentaries, lower incisors, and premolars, Heishanobaatar is distinguished by its laterally triangular third premolar, from which its species name is derived. Its referral to Eobaataridae was considered questionable by Kusuhashi et al. 2019.
