= Galveodon =

Galveodon Temporal range: Early Cretaceous

Scientific classification
- Domain: Eukaryota
- Kingdom: Animalia
- Phylum: Chordata
- Class: Mammalia
- Order: †Multituberculata
- Family: †Paulchoffatiidae
- Genus: †Galveodon

Species
- G. nannothus

Extinct family of mammals

Galveodon is an extinct mammal of the Lower Cretaceous. It was a relatively early representative of the also extinct order of Multituberculata.

Genus: Galveodon (Hahn G & Hahn R, 1992)

Species: Galveodon nannothus (Hahn G & Hahn R, 1992) from the Barremian (Lower Cretaceous) Camarillas Formation of Galve, Spain. This species is represented by a tooth in the collection of the museum in Galve.
