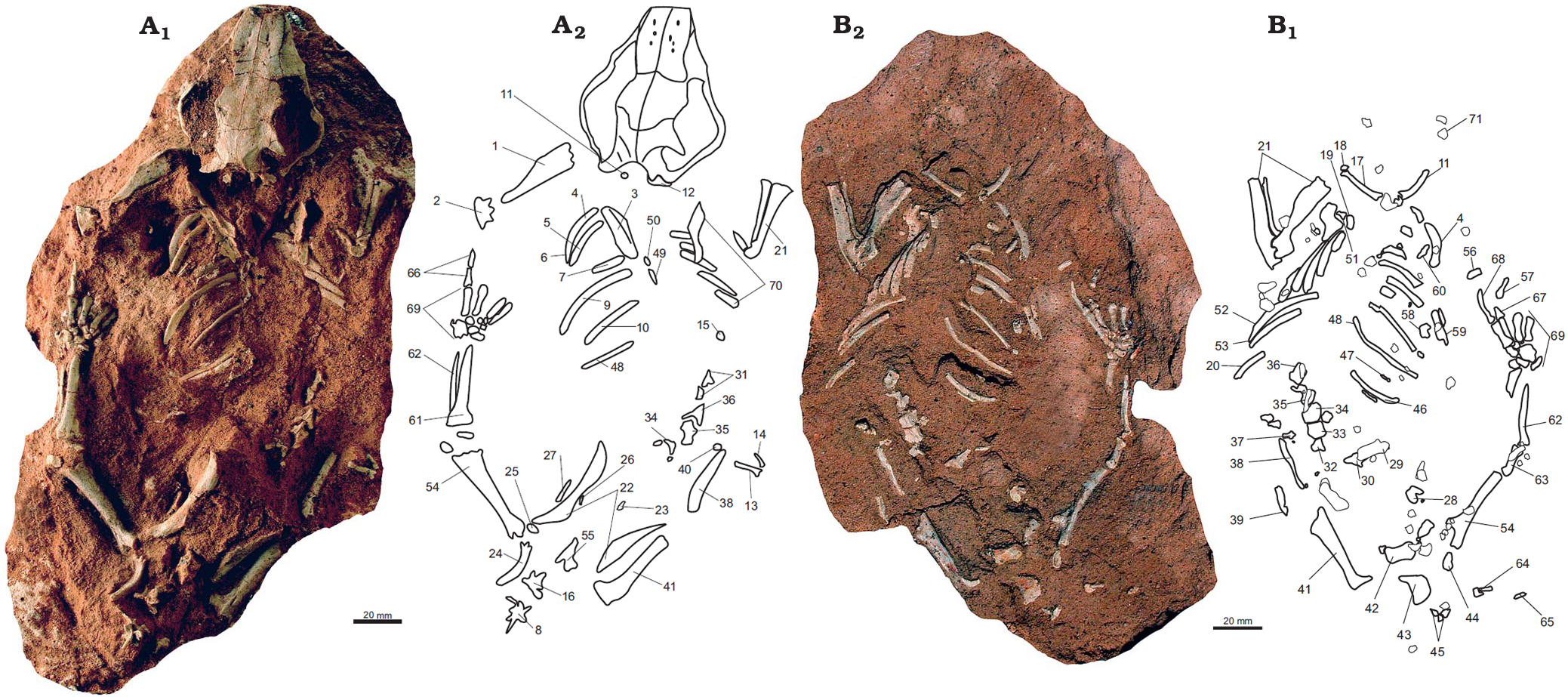
- Skeleton of Catopsbaatar

Scientific classification
- Kingdom: Animalia
- Phylum: Chordata
- Class: Mammalia
- Subclass: †Allotheria
- Order: †Multituberculata; Cope, 1884

Suborders
- †Plagiaulacida (paraphyletic); †Cimolodonta

= Multituberculata =

Multituberculates Temporal range: Middle Jurassic-Late Eocene 168–34 Ma

Extinct order of mammals

Multituberculata (commonly known as multituberculates, named for the multiple tubercles of their teeth) is an extinct order of rodent-like mammals with a fossil record spanning over 130 million years. They first appeared in the Middle Jurassic, and reached a peak diversity during the Late Cretaceous and Paleocene. They declined from the mid-Paleocene onwards, finally going extinct in the late Eocene. They are the most diverse order of Mesozoic mammals with more than 200 species known, ranging from mouse-sized to beaver-sized. These species occupied a diversity of ecological niches, ranging from burrow-dwelling to squirrel-like arborealism to jerboa-like hoppers. Multituberculates are usually placed as crown mammals outside either of the two main groups of living mammals, Theria — placentals and marsupials — and Monotremata, but usually as closer to Theria than to monotremes. They are considered to be closely related to Euharamiyida and Gondwanatheria as part of Allotheria.

== Description ==
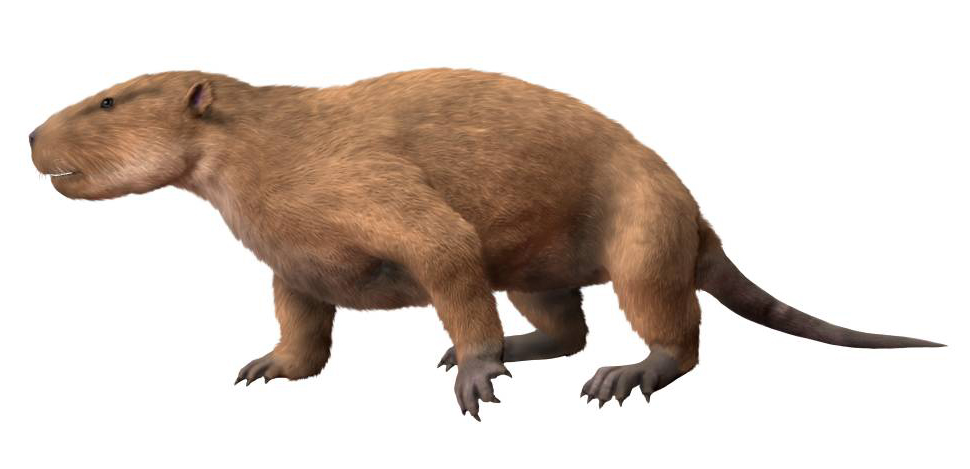
Restoration of Taeniolabis, the largest multituberculate at approximately 22 kg (49 lb).

The multituberculates had a cranial and dental anatomy superficially similar to rodents such as mice and rats, with cheek-teeth separated from the chisel-like front teeth by a wide tooth-less gap (the diasteme). Each cheek-tooth displayed several rows of small cusps (or tubercles, hence the name) that operated against similar rows in the teeth of the jaw; the exact homology of these cusps to therian ones is still a matter of debate. Unlike rodents, which have ever-growing teeth, multituberculates underwent dental replacement patterns typical of most mammals (though in at least some species the lower incisors continued to erupt long after the root's closure). Multituberculates are notable for the presence of a massive fourth lower premolar, the plagiaulacoid; other mammals, like Plesiadapiformes and diprotodontian marsupials, also have similar premolars in both upper and lower jaws, but in multituberculates this tooth is massive and the upper premolars are not modified this way. In basal multituberculates all three lower premolars were plagiaulacoids, increasing in size posteriorly, but in Cimolodonta only the fourth lower premolar remained, with the third one remaining only as a vestigial peg-like tooth, and in several taxa like taeniolabidoideans, the plagiaulacoid disappeared entirely or was reconverted into a molariform tooth.

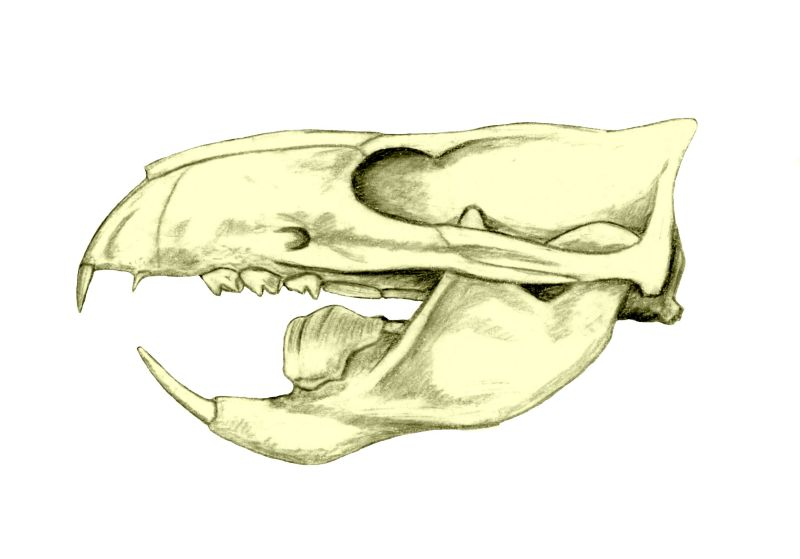
Skull of Ptilodus. Notice the massive blade-like lower premolar.

Unlike rodents and similar therians, multituberculates had a palinal jaw stroke (front-to-back), instead of a propalinal (back-to-front) or transverse (side-to-side) one; as a consequence, their jaw musculature and cusp orientation is radically different. Palinal jaw strokes are almost entirely absent in modern mammals (with the possible exception of the dugong), but are also present in haramiyidans, argyrolagoideans and tritylodontids, the former historically united with multituberculates on that basis. Multituberculate mastication is thought to have operated in a two stroke cycle: first, food held in place by the last upper premolar was sliced by the bladelike lower pre-molars as the dentary moved orthally (upward). Then the lower jaw moved palinally, grinding the food between the molar cusp rows.

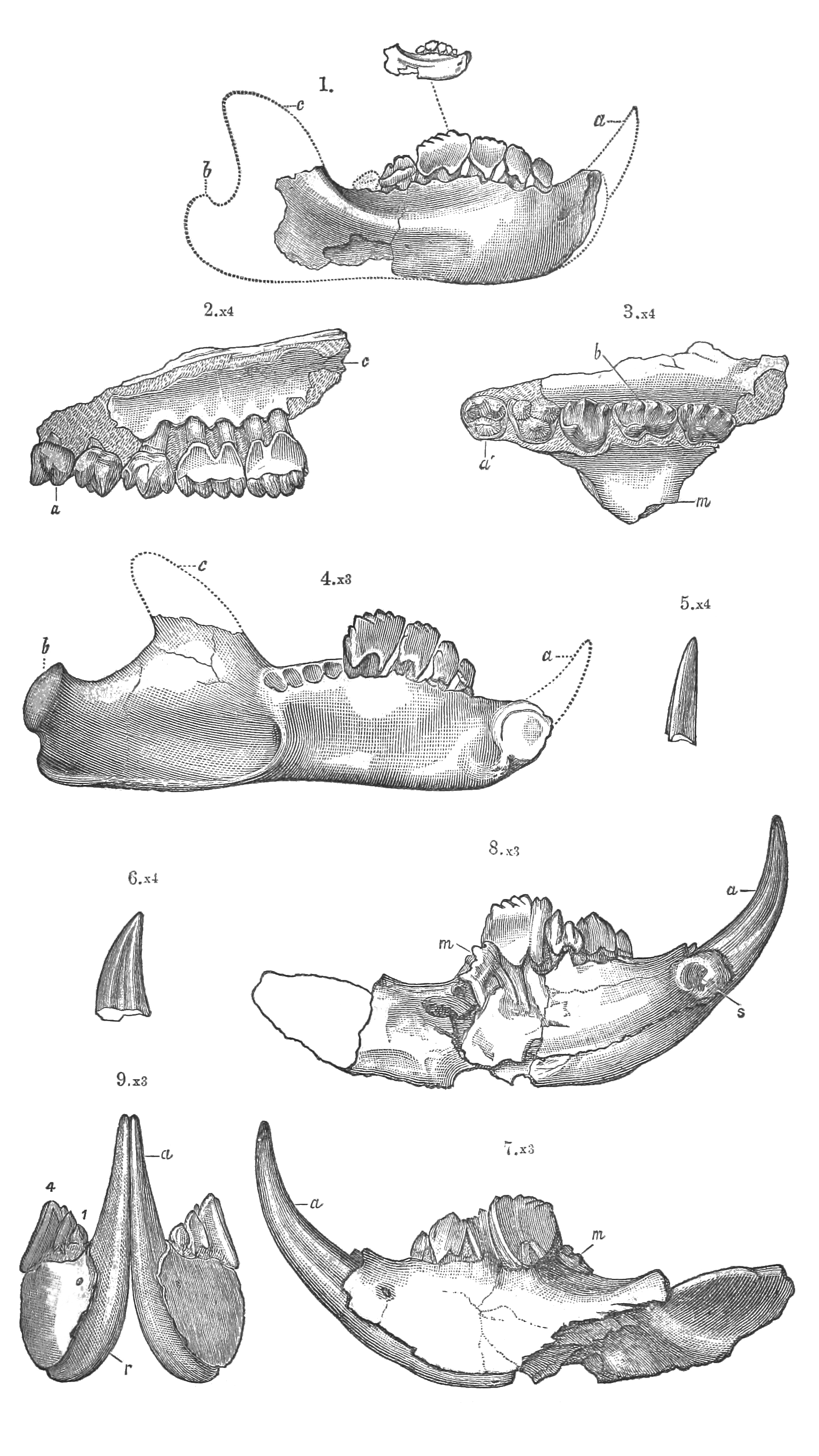
Lower jaws and teeth of allodontid multituberculates

The structure of the pelvis in the Multituberculata suggests that they gave birth to tiny helpless, underdeveloped young, similar to modern marsupials, such as kangaroos. However, a 2022 study reveals that they might actually have had long gestation periods like placentals. However, in 2024, all Allotheria (including multituberculates) fell outside the crown group of Mammalia, implying that cimolodonts developed placental-like gestation (and viviparity in general) independently, rather than multituberculates and therians having a common viviparous ancestor.

At least two lineages developed hypsodonty, in which tooth enamel extends beyond the gumline: lambdopsalid taeniolabidoideans and sudamericid gondwanatheres.

Studies published in 2018 demonstrated that multituberculates had relatively complex brains, some braincase regions even absent in therian mammals.

== Evolution ==
Multituberculates first appear in the fossil record during the Jurassic period, and then survived and even dominated for over one hundred million years, longer than any other order of mammaliforms, including placental mammals. The earliest known multituberculates are from the Middle Jurassic (Bathonian ~166-168 million years ago) of England and Russia, including Hahnotherium and Kermackodon from the Forest Marble Formation of England, and Tashtykia and Tagaria from the Itat Formation of Russia. These forms are only known from isolated teeth, which bear close similarity to those of euharamyidans, which they are suspected to be closely related to. During the Late Jurassic and Early Cretaceous, basal multituberculates, collectively grouped into the paraphyletic "Plagiaulacida", were abundant and widespread across Laurasia (including Europe, Asia and North America). During the Aptian stage of the Early Cretaceous, the advanced subgroup Cimolodonta appeared in North America, characterised by a reduced number of lower premolars, with a blade-like lower fourth premolar. By the early Late Cretaceous (Cenomanian) Cimolodonta had replaced all other multituberculate lineages.

During the Late Cretaceous, multituberculates experienced an adaptive radiation, corresponding with a shift towards herbivory. Multituberculates reached their peak diversity during the early Paleocene, shortly after the Cretaceous–Paleogene extinction event, but declined from the mid Paleocene onwards, likely due to competition with placental mammals such as rodents and ungulates. The group finally became extinct in the Late Eocene.

There are some isolated records of multituberculates from the Southern Hemisphere, including the cimolodontan Corriebaatar from the Early Cretaceous of Australia, and fragmentary remains from the Late Cretaceous Maevarano Formation of Madagascar. The family Ferugliotheriidae from the Late Cretaceous of South America, traditionally considered gondwanatherians, may actually be cimolodontan multituberculates.

During the Late Cretaceous and Paleocene the multituberculates radiated into a wide variety of morphotypes, including the squirrel-like arboreal ptilodonts. The peculiar shape of their last lower premolar is their most outstanding feature. These teeth were larger and more elongated than the other cheek-teeth and had an occlusive surface forming a serrated slicing blade. Though it can be assumed that this was used for crushing seeds and nuts, it is believed that most small multituberculates also supplemented their diet with insects, worms, and fruits. Tooth marks attributed to multituberculates are known on Champsosaurus fossils, indicating that at least some of these mammals were scavengers. A ptilodont that thrived in North America was Ptilodus. Thanks to the well-preserved Ptilodus specimens found in the Bighorn Basin, Wyoming, we know that these multituberculates were able to abduct and adduct their big toes, and thus that their foot mobility was similar to that of modern squirrels, which descend trees head first.

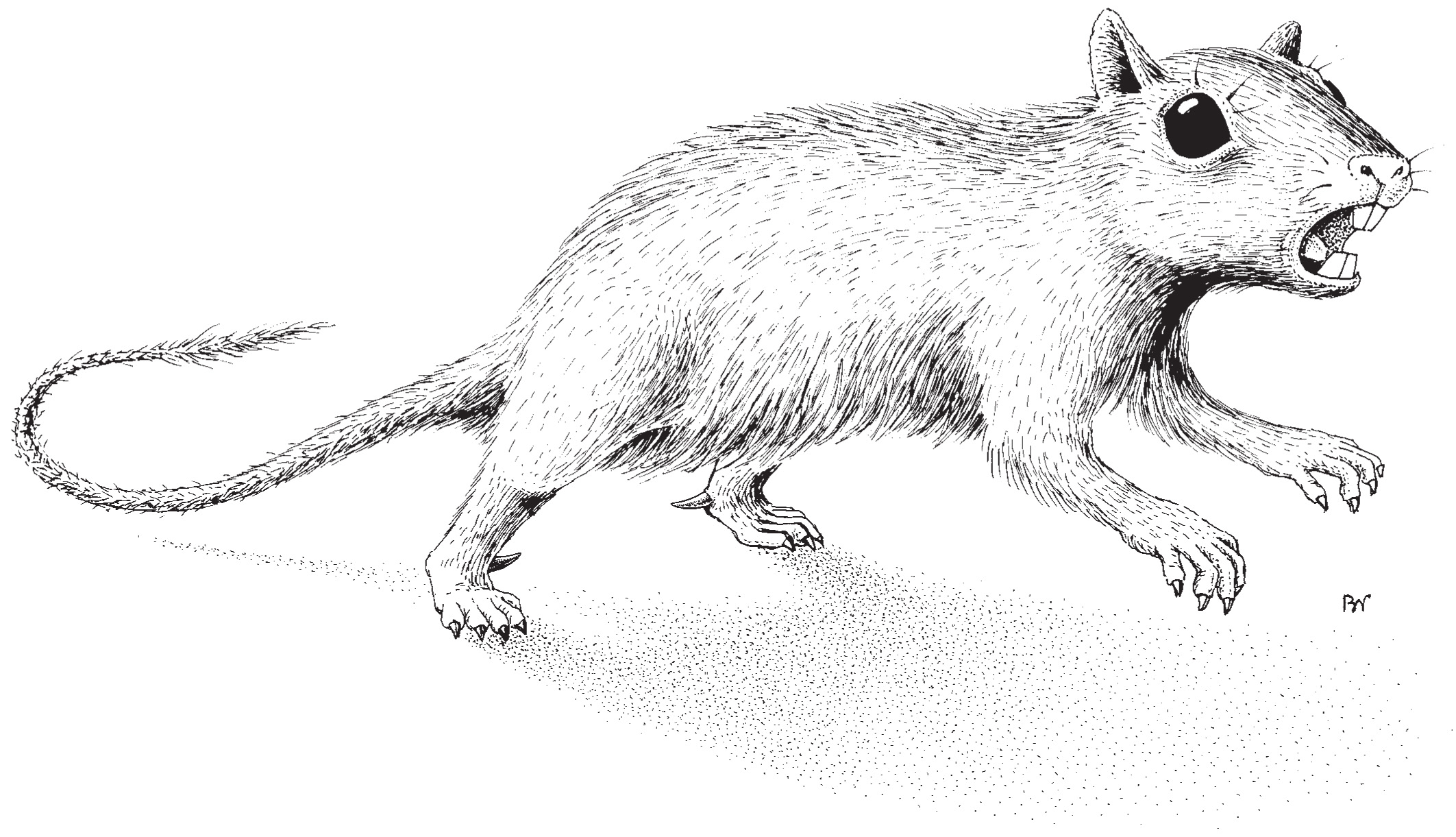
Restoration of Catopsbaatar

Another group of multituberculates, the taeniolabids, were heavier and more massively built, indicating that they lived a fully terrestrial life. The largest specimens weighed probably as much as 22 kg (49 lb), making them comparable in size to large rodents like the modern beaver.

== Classification ==
Multituberculata is generally placed within Allotheria alongside Euharamiyida, a clade of mammals known from the Middle Jurassic to Early Cretaceous of Asia and possibly Europe that possess several morphological similarities with multituberculates.

Gondwanatheria is a monophyletic group of allotherians that was diverse in the Late Cretaceous of South America, India, Madagascar and possibly Africa and occurs onwards into the Paleogene of South America and Antarctica. Their placement within Allotheria is highly controversial, with some phylogenies recovering the group as deeply nested within multituberculates, while others recover them as a distinct branch of allotherians separate from multituberculates.

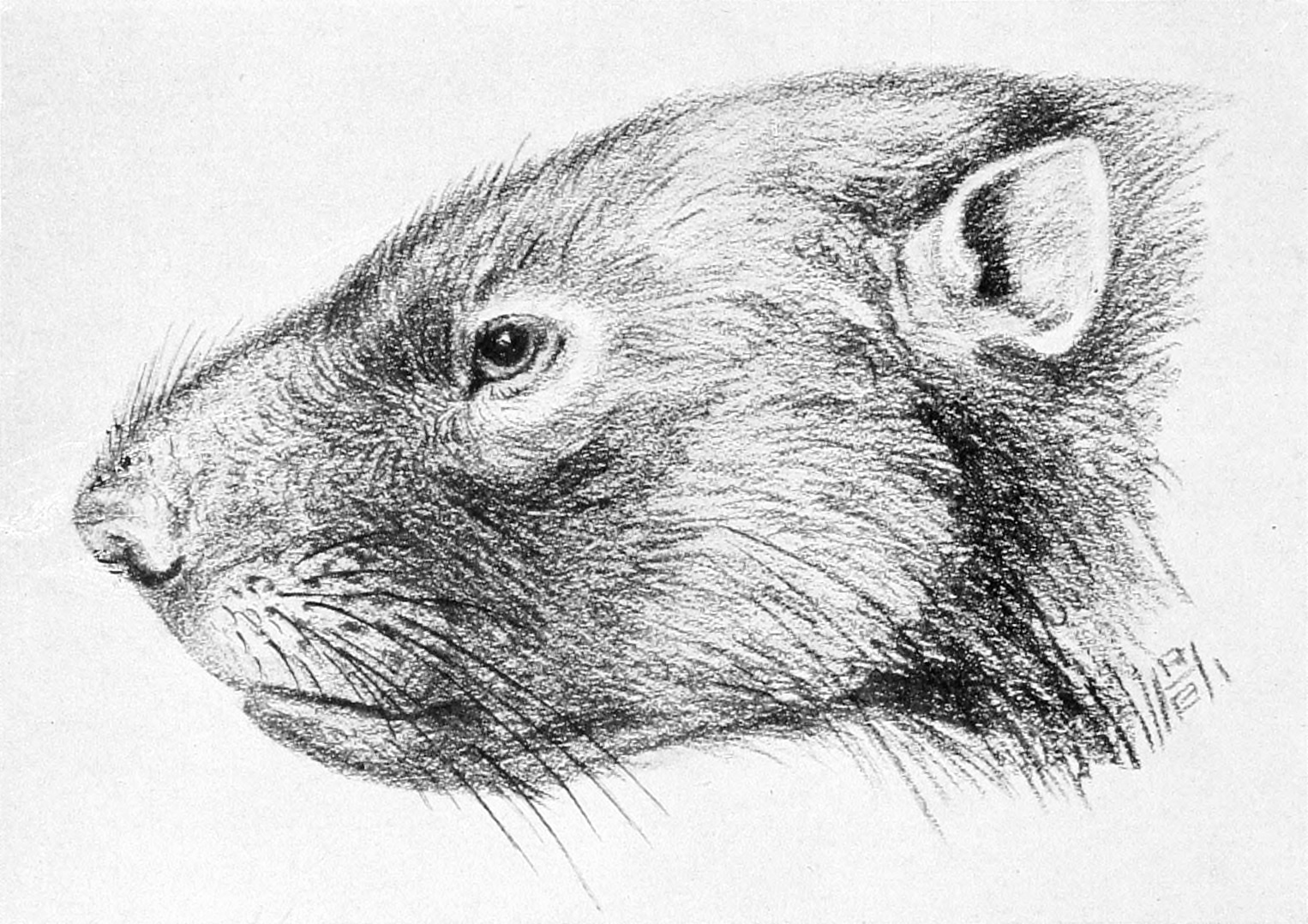
Restoration of Taeniolabis taoensis

In their 2001 study, Kielan-Jaworowska and Hurum found that most multituberculates could be referred to two suborders: "Plagiaulacida" and Cimolodonta. The exception is the genus Arginbaatar, which shares characteristics with both groups.

"Plagiaulacida" is paraphyletic, representing the more primitive evolutionary grade. Its members are the more basal Multituberculata. Chronologically, they ranged from perhaps the Middle Jurassic until the mid-Cretaceous. This group is further subdivided into three informal groupings: the allodontid line, the paulchoffatiid line, and the plagiaulacid line.

Cimolodonta is, apparently, a natural (monophyletic) suborder. This includes the more derived Multituberculata, which have been identified from the lower Cretaceous to the Eocene. The superfamilies Djadochtatherioidea, Taeniolabidoidea, Ptilodontoidea are recognized, as is the Paracimexomys group. Additionally, there are the families Cimolomyidae, Boffiidae, Eucosmodontidae, Kogaionidae, Microcosmodontidae and the two genera Uzbekbaatar and Viridomys. More precise placement of these types awaits further discoveries and analysis.

=== Taxonomy ===
Subgroups

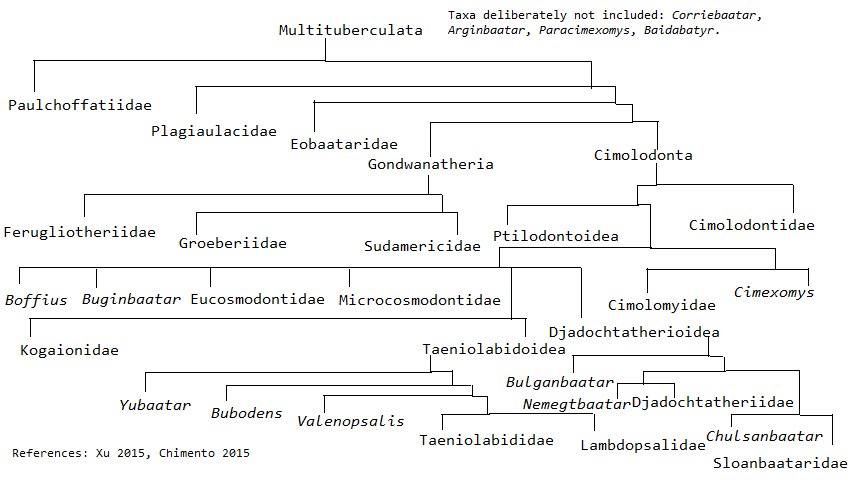
Multituberculate phylogenetic tree

Main article: List of multituberculate species

Based on the combined works of Mikko's Phylogeny Archive and Paleofile.com.

Suborder †Plagiaulacida Simpson 1925

- Genus ?†Argillomys Cifelli, Gordon & Lipka 2013
  - Species †Argillomys marylandensis Cifelli, Gordon & Lipka 2013
- Genus ?†Janumys Eaton & Cifelli 2001
  - Species †Janumys erebos Eaton & Cifelli 2001
- Super family †Allodontoidea Marsh 1889
  - Genus †?Glirodon Engelmann & Callison, 2001
    - Species †G. grandis Engelmann & Callison, 2001
  - Family †Arginbaataridae Hahn & Hahn, 1983
    - Genus †Arginbaatar Trofimov, 1980
      - Species †A. dmitrievae Trofimov, 1980
  - Family †Zofiabaataridae Bakker, 1992
    - Genus †Zofiabaatar Bakker & Carpenter, 1990
      - Species †Z. pulcher Bakker & Carpenter, 1990
  - Family †Allodontidae Marsh, 1889
    - Genus †Passumys Cifelli, Davis & Sames 2014
      - Species †Passumys angelli Cifelli, Davis & Sames 2014
    - Genus †Ctenacodon Marsh, 1879
      - Species †C. serratus Marsh, 1879
      - Species †C. nanus Marsh, 1881
      - Species †C. laticeps (Marsh, 1881) [Allodon laticeps Marsh 1881]
      - Species †C. scindens Simpson, 1928
    - Genus †Psalodon Simpson, 1926
      - Species †P. potens (Marsh, 1887) [Ctenacodon potens Marsh 1887]
      - Species †P. fortis (Marsh, 1887) Simpson 1929 [Allodon fortis Marsh 1887]
      - Species †P. marshi Simpson, 1929
- Super family †Paulchoffatioidea Hahn 1969 sensu Hahn & Hahn 2003
  - Genus ?†Mojo Hahn, LePage & Wouters 1987
    - Species †Mojo usuratus Hahn, LePage & Wouters 1987
  - Genus ?†Rugosodon Yuan et al., 2013
    - Species †Rugosodon eurasiaticus Yuan et al., 2013
  - Family †Pinheirodontidae Hahn & Hahn, 1999
    - Genus †Bernardodon Hahn & Hahn, 1999
      - Species †B. atlanticus Hahn & Hahn, 1999
      - Species †B. sp. Hahn & Hahn, 1999
    - Genus †Cantalera Badiola, Canudo & Cuenca-Bescos, 2008
      - Species †Cantalera abadi Badiola, Canudo & Cuenca-Bescos, 2008
    - Genus †Ecprepaulax Hahn & Hahn, 1999
      - Species †E. anomala Hahn & Hahn, 1999
    - Genus †Gerhardodon Kielan-Jaworowska & Ensom, 1992
      - Species †G. purbeckensis Kielan-Jaworowska & Ensom, 1992
    - Genus †Iberodon Hahn & Hahn, 1999
      - Species †I. quadrituberculatus Hahn & Hahn, 1999
    - Genus †Lavocatia Canudo & Cuenca-Bescós, 1996
      - Species †L. alfambrensis Canudo & Cuenca-Bescós, 1996
    - Genus †Pinheirodon Hahn & Hahn, 1999
      - Species †P. pygmaeus Hahn & Hahn, 1999
      - Species †P. vastus Hahn & Hahn, 1999
  - Family †Paulchoffatiidae Hahn, 1969
    - Genus ?†Galveodon Hahn & Hahn, 1992
      - Species †G. nannothus Hahn & Hahn, 1992
    - Genus ?†Sunnyodon Kielan-Jaworowska & Ensom, 1992
      - Species †S. notleyi Kielan-Jaworowska & Ensom, 1992
    - subfamily †Paulchoffatiinae Hahn, 1971
      - Genus †Paulchoffatia Kühne, 1961
        - Species †P. delgador Kühne, 1961
      - Genus †Pseudobolodon Hahn, 1977
        - Species †P. oreas Hahn, 1977
        - Species †P. krebsi Hahn & Hahn, 1994
      - Genus †Henkelodon Hahn, 1987
        - Species †H. naias Hahn, 1987
      - Genus †Guimarotodon Hahn, 1969
        - Species †G. leiriensis Hahn, 1969
      - Genus †Meketibolodon (Hahn, 1978) Hahn, 1993
        - Species †M. robustus (Hahn, 1978) Hahn, 1993 [Pseudobolodon robusutus Hahn 1978]
      - Genus †Plesiochoffatia Hahn & Hahn, 1999 [Parachoffatia Hahn & Hahn 1998 non Mangold 1970]
        - Species †P. thoas (Hahn & Hahn, 1998) Hahn & Hahn 1999 [Parachoffatia thoa Hahn & Hahn 1998]
        - Species †P. peparethos (Hahn & Hahn, 1998) Hahn & Hahn 1999 [Parachoffatia peparethos Hahn & Hahn 1998]
        - Species †P. staphylos (Hahn & Hahn, 1998) Hahn & Hahn 1999 [Parachoffatia staphylos Hahn & Hahn 1998]
      - Genus †Xenachoffatia Hahn & Hahn, 1998
        - Species †X. oinopion Hahn & Hahn, 1998
      - Genus †Bathmochoffatia Hahn & Hahn, 1998
        - Species †B. hapax Hahn & Hahn, 1998
      - Genus †Kielanodon Hahn, 1987
        - Species †K. hopsoni Hahn, 1987
      - Genus †Meketichoffatia Hahn, 1993
        - Species †M. krausei Hahn, 1993
      - Genus †Renatodon Hahn, 2001
        - Species †Renatodon amalthea Hahn, 2001
    - Subfamily †Kuehneodontinae Hahn, 1971
      - Genus †Kuehneodon Hahn, 1969
        - Species †K. dietrichi Hahn, 1969
        - Species †K. barcasensis Hahn & Hahn, 2001
        - Species †K. dryas Hahn, 1977
        - Species †K. guimarotensis Hahn, 1969
        - Species †K. hahni Antunes, 1988
        - Species †K. simpsoni Hahn, 1969
        - Species †K. uniradiculatus Hahn, 1978

Plagiaulacoidea
- Super family †Plagiaulacoidea Ameghino, 1894
  - Family †Plagiaulacidae Gill, 1872 sensu Kielan-Jaworowska & Hurum, 2001 [Bolodontidae Osborn 1887]
    - Genus ?†Morrisonodon Hahn & Hahn, 2004
      - Species †Morrisonodon brentbaatar (Bakker, 1998) Hahn & Hahn, 2004 [Ctenacodon brentbaatar Bakker, 1998]
    - Genus †Plagiaulax Falconer, 1857
      - Species †P. becklesii Falconer, 1857
      - Species †P. dawsoni Woodward, 1891 [Plioprion dawsoni Woodward, 1891; Loxaulax dawsoni (Woodward, 1891) Sloan, 1979]
    - Genus †Bolodon Owen, 1871 [Plioprion Cope, 1884]
      - Species †B. crassidens Owen, 1871
      - Species †B. falconeri Owen, 1871 [Pligiaulax falconeri Owen, 1871; Plioprion falconeri (Owen, 1871)]
      - Species †B. hydei Cifelli, Davis & Sames, 2014
      - Species †B. minor Falconer, 1857 [Pligiaulax minor Falconer, 1857; Plioprion minor (Falconer, 1857)]
      - Species †B. osborni Simpson, 1928 [Plioprion osborni (Simpson, 1928); Ctenacodon osborni Simpson, 1928]
      - Species ?†B. elongatus Simpson, 1928
- Family †Eobaataridae Kielan-Jaworowska, Dashzeveg & Trofimov, 1987
  - Genus †Eobaatar Kielan-Jaworowska, Dashzeveg & Trofimov, 1987
    - Species †E. clemensi Sweetman, 2009
    - Species †E. hispanicus Hahn & Hahn, 1992
    - Species †E. magnus Kielan-Jaworowska, Dashzeveg & Trofimov, 1987
    - Species †E. minor Kielan-Jaworowska, Dashzeveg & Trofimov, 1987
    - Species †E. pajaronensis Hahn & Hahn, 2001
  - Genus †Hakusanobaatar Kusuhashi et al., 2008
    - Species †H. matsuoi Kusuhashi et al., 2008
  - Genus †Heishanobaatar Kusuhashi et al., 2010
    - Species †H. triangulus Kusuhashi et al., 2010
  - Genus †Iberica Badiola et al., 2011
    - Species †Iberica hahni Badiola et al., 2011
  - Genus †Liaobaatar Kusuhashi et al., 2009
    - Species †L. changi Kusuhashi et al., 2009
  - Genus †Loxaulax Simpson, 1928 [Parendotherium Crusafont Pairó & Adrover, 1966]
    - Species †L. valdensis (Woodward, 1911) Simpson, 1928[Dipriodon valdensis Woodward, 1911]
    - Species †L. herreroi (Crusafont Pairó & Adrover, 1966) [Parendotherium herreroi Crusafont Pairó & Adrover 1966]
  - Genus †Monobaatar Kielan-Jaworowska, Dashzeveg & Trofimov, 1987
    - Species †M. mimicus Kielan-Jaworowska, Dashzeveg & Trofimov, 1987
  - Genus †Sinobaatar Hu & Wang, 2002
    - Species †S. lingyuanensis Hu & Wang, 2002
    - Species †S. xiei Kusuhashi et al., 2009
    - Species †S. fuxinensis Kusuhashi et al., 2009
  - Genus †Tedoribaatar Kusuhashi et al., 2008
    - Species †T. reini Kusuhashi et al., 2008
  - Genus †Teutonodon Martin et al., 2016
    - Species †Teutonodon langenbergensis Martin et al. 2016
- Family †Albionbaataridae Kielan-Jaworowska & Ensom, 1994
  - Genus †Albionbaatar Kielan-Jaworowska & Ensom, 1994
    - Species †A. denisae Kielan-Jaworowska & Ensom, 1994
  - Genus †Kielanobaatar Kusuhashi et al., 2010
    - Species †K. badaohaoensis Kusuhashi et al., 2010
  - Genus †Proalbionbaatar Hahn & Hahn, 1998
    - Species †P. plagiocyrtus Hahn & Hahn, 1998
- Suborder †Gondwanatheria McKenna 1971 [Gondwanatheroidea Krause & Bonaparte 1993]
  - Family †Groeberiidae Patterson, 1952
    - Genus †Groeberia Patterson 1952
      - Species †G. minoprioi Ryan Patterson, 1952
      - Species †G. pattersoni G. G. Simpson, 1970
    - Genus †Klohnia Flynn & Wyss 1999
      - Species †K. charrieri Flynn & Wyss 1999
      - Species †K. major Goin et al., 2010
    - Genus ?†Epiklohnia Goin et al., 2010
      - Species †Epiklohnia verticalis Goin et al., 2010
    - Genus ?†Praedens Goin et al., 2010
      - Species †Praedens aberrans Goin et al., 2010
  - Family †Ferugliotheriidae Bonaparte, 1986
    - Genus †Ferugliotherium Bonaparte, 1986a [Vucetichia Bonaparte, 1990]
      - †Ferugliotherium windhauseni Bonaparte, 1986a [Vucetichia gracilis Bonaparte, 1990]
    - Genus †Trapalcotherium Rougier et al., 2008
      - †Trapalcotherium matuastensis Rougier et al., 2008
  - Family †Sudamericidae Scillato-Yané & Pascual, 1984 [Gondwanatheridae Bonaparte, 1986; Patagonidae Pascual & Carlini, 1987]
    - Genus †Greniodon Goin et al., 2012
      - †Greniodon sylvanicus Goin et al., 2012
    - Genus †Vintana Krause et al., 2014
      - †Vintana sertichi Krause et al., 2014
    - Genus †Dakshina Wilson, Das Sarama & Anantharaman, 2007
      - †Dakshina jederi Wilson, Das Sarama & Anantharaman, 2007
    - Genus †Gondwanatherium Bonaparte, 1986
      - †Gondwanatherium patagonicum Bonaparte, 1986
    - Genus †Sudamerica Scillato-Yané & Pascual, 1984
      - †Sudamerica ameghinoi Scillato-Yané & Pascual, 1984
    - Genus †Lavanify Krause et al., 1997
      - †Lavanify miolaka Krause et al., 1997
    - Genus †Bharattherium Prasad et al., 2007
      - †Bharattherium bonapartei Prasad et al.,, 2007
    - Genus †Patagonia Pascual & Carlini' 1987
      - †Patagonia peregrina Pascual & Carlini' 1987

Cimolodonta
- Suborder †Cimolodonta McKenna, 1975
  - Genus ?†Allocodon non Marsh, 1881
    - Species †A. fortis Marsh, 1889
    - Species †A. lentus Marsh, 1892 [Cimolomys lentus]
    - Species †A. pumilis Marsh, 1892 [Cimolomys pumilus]
    - Species †A. rarus Marsh, 1889
  - Genus ?†Ameribaatar Eaton & Cifelli, 2001
    - Species †A. zofiae Eaton & Cifelli, 2001
  - Genus ?†Bubodens Wilson, 1987
    - Species †Bubodens magnus Wilson, 1987
  - Genus ?†Clemensodon Krause, 1992
    - Species †Clemensodon megaloba Krause, 1992 [Kimbetohia cambi, in partim]
  - Genus ?†Fractinus Higgins 2003
    - Species †Fractinus palmorum Higgins, 2003
  - Genus ?†Uzbekbaatar Kielan-Jaworowska & Nesov, 1992
    - Species †Uzbekbaatar kizylkumensis Kielan-Jaworowska & Nesov, 1992
  - Genus ?†Viridomys Fox 1971
    - Species †Viridomys orbatus Fox 1971
  - Family †Corriebaataridae Rich et al., 2009
    - Genus ?†Corriebaatar Rich et al., 2009
      - Species †Corriebaatar marywaltersae Rich et al., 2009
  - Paracimexomys group
    - Genus Paracimexomys Archibald, 1982
      - Species? †P. crossi Cifelli, 1997
      - Species? †P. dacicus Grigorescu & Hahn, 1989
      - Species? †P. oardaensis (Codrea et al., 2014) [Barbatodon oardaensis Codrea et al., 2014]
      - Species †P. magnus (Sahni, 1972) Archibald, 1982 [Cimexomys magnus Sahni, 1972]
      - Species †P. magister (Fox, 1971) Archibald, 1982 [Cimexomys magister Fox, 1971]
      - Species †P. perplexus Eaton & Cifelli, 2001
      - Species †P. robisoni Eaton & Nelson, 1991
      - Species †P. priscus (Lillegraven, 1969) Archibald, 1982 [Cimexomys priscus Lillegraven, 1969; genotype Paracimexomys sensu Eaton & Cifelli, 2001]
      - Species †P. propriscus Hunter, Heinrich & Weishampel 2010
    - Genus Cimexomys Sloan & Van Valen, 1965
      - Species †C. antiquus Fox, 1971
      - Species †C. gregoryi Eaton, 1993
      - Species †C. judithae Sahni, 1972 [Paracimexomys judithae (Sahni, 1972) Archibald, 1982]
      - Species †C. arapahoensis Middleton & Dewar, 2004
      - Species †C. minor Sloan & Van Valen, 1965
      - Species? †C. gratus (Jepson, 1930) Lofgren, 1995 [Cimexomys hausoi Archibald, 1983; Eucosmodon gratus Jepson, 1930; Mesodma ambigua? Jepson, 1940; Stygimus gratus Jepson, 1930]
    - Genus †Bryceomys Eaton, 1995
      - Species †B. fumosus Eaton, 1995
      - Species †B. hadrosus Eaton, 1995
      - Species †B. intermedius Eaton & Cifelli, 2001
    - Genus †Cedaromys Eaton & Cifelli, 2001
      - Species †C. bestia (Eaton & Nelson, 1991) Eaton & Cifelli, 2001 [Paracimexomys bestia Eaton & Nelson, 1991]
      - Species †C. hutchisoni Eaton 2002
      - Species †C. minimus Eaton 2009
      - Species †C. parvus Eaton & Cifelli, 2001
    - Genus †Dakotamys Eaton, 1995
      - Species? †D. sp. Eaton, 1995
      - Species †D. malcolmi Eaton, 1995
      - Species †D. shakespeari Eaton 2013
  - Family †Boffidae Hahn & Hahn, 1983 sensu Kielan-Jaworowska & Hurum 2001
    - Genus †Boffius Vianey-Liaud, 1979
      - Species †Boffius splendidus Vianey-Liaud, 1979 [Boffiidae Hahn & Hahn, 1983 sensu Kielan-Jaworowska & Hurum, 2001]
  - Family †Cimolomyidae Marsh, 1889 sensu Kielan-Jaworowska & Hurum, 2001
    - Genus †Paressodon Wilson, Dechense & Anderson, 2010
      - Species †Paressodon nelsoni Wilson, Dechense & Anderson, 2010
    - Genus †Cimolomys Marsh, 1889 [?Allacodon Marsh, 1889; Selenacodon Marsh, 1889]
      - Species †C. clarki Sahni, 1972
      - Species †C. gracilis Marsh, 1889 [Cimolomys digona Marsh, 1889; Meniscoessus brevis; Ptilodus gracilis Osborn, 1893 non Gidley 1909; Selenacodon brevis Marsh, 1889]
      - Species †C. trochuus Lillegraven, 1969
      - Species †C. milliensis Eaton, 1993a
      - Species ?†C. bellus Marsh, 1889
    - Genus ?†Essonodon Simpson, 1927
      - Species †E. browni Simpson, 1927 [cimolodontidae? Kielan-Jaworowska & Hurum 2001]
    - Genus ?†Buginbaatar Kielan-Jaworowska & Sochava, 1969
      - Species †Buginbaatar transaltaiensis Kielan-Jaworowska & Sochava, 1969
    - Genus ?†Meniscoessus Cope, 1882 [Dipriodon Marsh, 1889; Tripriodon Marsh, 1889 nomen dubium; Triprotodon Chure & McIntosh, 1989 nomen dubium; Selenacodon Marsh, 1889, Halodon Marsh, 1889, Oracodon Marsh, 1889]
      - Species †M. caperatus Marsh, 1889
      - Species †M. collomensis Lillegraven, 1987
      - Species †M. conquistus Cope 1882
      - Species †M. ferox Fox, 1971a
      - Species †M. intermedius Fox, 1976b
      - Species †M. major (Russell, 1936) [Cimolomys major Russell 1937]
      - Species †M. robustus (Marsh, 1889) [Dipriodon robustus Marsh 1889; Dipriodon lacunatus Marsh, 1889; Tripriodon coelatus Marsh, 1889; Meniscoessus coelatus Marsh, 1889; Selenacodon fragilis Marsh, 1889; Meniscoessus fragilis Marsh, 1889; Halodon sculptus (Marsh, 1889); Cimolomys sculptus Marsh, 1889; Meniscoessus sculptus Marsh, 1889; Oracodon anceps Marsh, 1889; Oracodon conulus Marsh, 1892; Meniscoessus borealis Simpson, 1927c; Meniscoessus greeni Wilson, 1987]
      - Species †M. seminoensis Eberle & Lillegraven, 1998a
  - Family †Kogaionidae Rãdulescu & Samson, 1996
    - Genus †Kogaionon Rãdulescu & Samson, 1996
      - Species †K. ungureanui Rãdulescu & Samson, 1996
    - Genus †Hainina Vianey-Liaud, 1979
      - Species †H. belgica Vianey-Liaud, 1979
      - Species †H. godfriauxi Vianey-Liaud, 1979
      - Species †H. pyrenaica Peláez-Campomanes, López-Martínez, Álvarez-Sierra & Daams, 2000
      - Species †H. vianeyae Peláez-Campomanes, López-Martínez, Álvarez-Sierra & Daams, 2000
    - Genus †Barbatodon Rãdulescu & Samson, 1986
      - Species †B. transylvanicum Rãdulescu & Samson, 1986
  - Family †Eucosmodontidae Jepsen, 1940 sensu Kielan-Jaworowska & Hurum, 2001 [Eucosmodontidae: Eucosmodontinae Jepsen, 1940 sensu McKenna & Bell, 1997]
    - Genus †Eucosmodon Matthew & Granger, 1921
      - Species †E. primus Granger & Simpson, 1929
      - Species †E. americanus Cope, 1885
      - Species †E. molestus Cope, 1869 [Neoplagiaulax molestus Cope, 1869]
    - Genus †Stygimys Sloan & Van Valen, 1965
      - Species †S. camptorhiza Johnston & Fox, 1984
      - Species †S. cupressus Fox, 1981
      - Species †S. kuszmauli [Eucosmodon kuszmauli]
      - Species †S. jepseni Simpson, 1935
      - Species †S. teilhardi Granger & Simpson, 1929
  - Family †Microcosmodontidae Holtzman & Wolberg, 1977 [Eucosmodontidae: Microcosmodontinae Holtzman & Wolberg, 1977 sensu McKenna & Bell, 1997]
    - Genus †PentacosmodonJepsen, 1940
      - Species †P. pronus Jepsen, 1940 [Djadochtatheroid? (Kielan-Jaworowska & Hurum, 2001)]
    - Genus †Acheronodon Archibald, 1982
      - Species †A. garbani Archibald, 1982
    - Genus †Microcosmodon Jepsen, 1930
      - Species †M. conus Jepsen, 1930
      - Species †M. rosei Krause, 1980
      - Species †M. arcuatus Johnston & Fox, 1984
      - Species †M. woodi Holtzman & Wolberg, 1977 [Eucosmodontine?]
      - Species †M. harleyi Weil, 1998
  - Superfamily †Ptilodontoidea Cope, 1887 sensu McKenna & Bell, 1997 e Kielan-Jaworowska & Hurum, 2001
    - Family †Cimolodontidae Marsh, 1889 sensu Kielan-Jaworowska & Hurum, 2001
      - Genus †Liotomus Lemoine, 1882 [Neoctenacodon Lemoine 1891]
        - Species? †L. marshi (Lemoine, 1882) Cope, 1884 [Neoctenacodon marshi Lemoine, 1882; Neoplagiaulax marshi (Lemoine 1882); Plagiaulax marshi (Lemoine 1882)] [Eucosmodontidae? McKenna & Bell, 1997]
      - Genus †Yubaatar Xu et al., 2015
        - Species †Yubaatar zhongyuanensis Xu et al., 2015
      - Genus †Anconodon Jepsen, 1940
        - Species? †A. lewisi (Simpson 1935) Sloan, 1987
        - Species †A. gibleyi (Simpson, 1935) [Ptilodus gidleyi Simpson, 1935]
        - Species †A. cochranensis (Russell, 1929) [Liotomus russelli (Simpson, 1935); Anconodon russelli (Simpson, 1935) Sloan, 1987; Ectopodon cochranensis (Russell, 1967)]
      - Genus †Cimolodon Marsh, 1889 [Nanomys Marsh, 1889, Nanomyops Marsh, 1892]
        - Species †C. agilis Marsh, 1889
        - Species †C. foxi Eaton, 2002
        - Species †C. gracilis Marsh, 1889
        - Species †C. electus Fox, 1971
        - Species †C. nitidus Marsh, 1889 [Allacodon rarus Marsh, 1892 sensu Clemens, 1964a; Nanomys minutus Marsh, 1889; Nanomyops minutus (Marsh, 1889) Marsh, 1892; Halodon serratus Marsh, 1889; Ptilodus serratus (Marsh, 1889) Gidley 1909]
        - Species †C. parvus Marsh, 1889
        - Species †C. peregrinus Donohue, Wilson & Breithaupt, 2013
        - Species †C. similis Fox, 1971
        - Species †C. wardi Eaton, 2006
    - Family Incertae sedis
      - Genus Neoliotomus Jepsen, 1930
        - Species †N. conventus Jepsen, 1930
        - Species †N. ultimus (Granger & Simpson, 1928)
    - Family †Neoplagiaulacidae Ameghino, 1890 [Ptilodontidae: Neoplagiaulacinae Ameghino, 1890 sensu McKenna & Bell, 1997]
      - Genus †Mesodma Jepsen, 1940
        - Species? †M. hensleighi Lillegraven, 1969
        - Species? †M. senecta Fox, 1971
        - Species †M. ambigua Jepsen, 1940
        - Species? †M. pygmaea Sloan, 1987
        - Species †M. formosa (Marsh, 1889) [Halodon formosus Marsh, 1889]
        - Species †M. primaeva (Lambe, 1902)
        - Species †M. thompsoni Clemens, 1964
      - Genus Ectypodus Matthew & Cranger, 1921 [Charlesmooria Kühne, 1969 ]
        - Species †E. aphronorus Sloan, 1981
        - Species? †E. childei Kühne, 1969
        - Species? †E. elaphus Scott, 2005
        - Species? †E. lovei (Sloan, 1966) Krishtlaka & Black, 1975
        - Species †E. musculus Matthew & Granger, 1921
        - Species †E. powelli Jepsen, 1940
        - Species? †E. simpsoni Jepsen, 1930
        - Species †E. szalayi Sloan, 1981
        - Species †E. tardus Jepsen, 1930
      - Genus †Mimetodon Jepsen, 1940
        - Species †M. krausei Sloan, 1981
        - Species †M. nanophus Holtzman, 1978 [Neoplagiaulax nanophus Holtzman, 1978]
        - Species †M. siberlingi(Simpson, 1935) Schiebout, 1974
        - Species †M. churchilli Jepsen, 1940
      - Genus †Neoplagiaulax Lemoine, 1882
        - Species †N. annae Vianey-Liaud, 1986
        - Species? †N. burgessi Archibald, 1982
        - Species †N. cimolodontoides Scott, 2005
        - Species †N. copei Lemoine, 1885
        - Species †N. donaldorum Scott & Krause, 2006
        - Species †N. eocaenus Lemoine, 1880
        - Species †N. grangeri Simpson, 1935
        - Species †N. hazeni Jepsen, 1940
        - Species †N. hunteri Krishtalka, 1973
        - Species †N. jepi Sloan, 1987
        - Species †N. kremnus Johnston & Fox, 1984
        - Species †N. macintyrei Slaon, 1981
        - Species †N. macrotomeus Wilson, 1956
        - Species †N. mckennai Sloan, 1987
        - Species †N. nelsoni Sloan, 1987
        - Species †N. nicolai Vianey-Liaud, 1986
        - Species †N. paskapooensis Scott, 2005
        - Species? †N. serrator Scott, 2005
        - Species †N. sylvani Vianey-Liaud, 1986
      - Genus †Parectypodus Jepsen, 1930
        - Species †P. armstrongi Johnston & Fox, 1984
        - Species? †P. corystes Scott, 2003
        - Species? †P. foxi Storer, 1991
        - Species †P. laytoni Jepsen, 1940
        - Species †P. lunatus Krause, 1982 [P. childei Kühne, 1969]
        - Species †P. simpsoni Jepsen, 1940
        - Species †P. sinclairi Simpson, 1935
        - Species †P. sloani Schiebout, 1974
        - Species †P. trovessartianus Cope, 1882 [P. trouessarti; Ptilodus; Mimetodon; Neoplagiaulax]
        - Species †P. sylviae Rigsby, 1980 [Ectypodus sylviae Rigby, 1980]
        - Species? †P. vanvaleni Sloan, 1981
      - Genus †Cernaysia Vianey-Liaud, 1986
        - Species †C. manueli Vianey-Liaud, 1986
        - Species †C. davidi Vianey-Liaud, 1986
      - Genus †Krauseia Vianey-Liaud, 1986
        - Species †K. clemensi Sloan, 1981 [Parectypodus clemensi Sloan, 1981]
      - Genus †XyronomysRigby, 1980
        - Species †X. swainae Rigby, 1980 [Xironomys (sic); ?Eucosmodontidae]
      - Genus †Xanclomys Rigby, 1980
        - Species †X. mcgrewiRigby, 1980
      - Genus †Mesodmops Tong & Wang, 1994
        - Species †M. dawsonae Tong & Wang, 1994
    - Family †Ptilodontidae Cope, 1887 [Ptilodontidae: Ptilodontinae Cope, 1887 sensu McKenna & Bell, 1997]
      - Genus †Kimbetohia Simpson, 1936
        - Species †K. cambi [Granger, Gregory & Colbert in Matthew, 1937, or Simpson, 1936]
        - Species †K. sp. cf. K. cambi
      - Genus †Ptilodus Cope, 1881 [Chirox Cope, 1884]
        - Species? †P. fractus
        - Species †P. kummae Krause, 1977
        - Species †P. gnomus Scott, Fox & Youzwyshyn, 2002 [cf. Ectypodus hazeni (Jepsen, 1940) Gazin, 1956]
        - Species †P. mediaevus Cope, 1881 [Ptilodus plicatus (Cope, 1884); Chirox plicatus Cope, 1884 P. ferronensis Gazin, 1941]
        - Species †P. montanus Douglass, 1908 [P. gracilis Gidley, 1909; P. admiralis Hay, 1930]
        - Species †P. tsosiensis Sloan, 1981
        - Species †P. wyomingensis Jepsen, 1940
      - Genus †Baiotomeus Krause, 1987
        - Species †B. douglassi Simpson, 1935 [Ptilodus; Mimetodon; Neoplagiaulax]
        - Species †B. lamberti Krause, 1987
        - Species †B. russelli Scott, Fox & Youzwyshyn, 2002
        - Species †B. rhothonion Scott, 2003
      - Genus †Prochetodon Jepsen, 1940
        - Species †P. cavus Jespen, 1940
        - Species †P. foxi Krause, 1987
        - Species †P. taxus Krause, 1987
        - Species? †P. speirsae Scott, 2004
  - Superfamily †Taeniolabidoidea Granger & Simpson, 1929 sensu Kielan-Jaworowska & Hurum, 2001
    - Genus †Prionessus Matthew & Granger, 1925
      - Species †P. lucifer Matthew & Granger, 1925
    - Family †Lambdopsalidae
      - Genus †Lambdopsalis Chow & Qi, 1978
        - Species †L. bulla Chow & Qi, 1978
      - Genus †Sphenopsalis Matthew, Granger & Simpson, 1928
        - Species †S. nobilis Matthew, Granger & Simpson, 1928
    - Family †Taeniolabididae Granger & Simpson, 1929
      - Genus †Taeniolabis Cope, 1882
        - Species †T. lamberti Simmons, 1987
        - Species †T. taoensis Cope, 1882
      - Genus †Kimbetopsalis
        - Species †K. simmonsae
  - Superfamily †Djadochtatherioidea Kielan-Jaworowska & Hurum, 1997 sensu Kielan-Jaworowska & Hurum, 2001[Djadochtatheria Kielan-Jaworowska & Hurum, 1997]
    - Genus? †Bulganbaatar Kielan-Jaworowska, 1974
      - Species? †B. nemegtbaataroides Kielan-Jaworowska, 1974
    - Genus †Nemegtbaatar Kielan-Jaworowska, 1974
      - Species? †N. gobiensis Kielan-Jaworowska, 1974
    - Family †Chulsanbaataridae Kielan-Jaworowska, 1974
      - Genus †Chulsanbaatar Kielan-Jaworowska, 1974
        - Species †C. vulgaris Kielan-Jaworowska, 1974
    - Family †Sloanbaataridae Kielan-Jaworowska, 1974
      - Genus †Kamptobaatar Kielan-Jaworowska, 1970
        - Species? †K. kuczynskii Kielan-Jaworowska, 1970
      - Genus †Nessovbaatar Kielan-Jaworowska & Hurum, 1997
        - Species †N. multicostatus Kielan-Jaworowska & Hurum, 1997
      - Genus †Sloanbaatar Kielan-Jaworowska, 1974
        - Species †S. mirabilis Kielan-Jaworowska, 1974 [Sloanbaatarinae]
    - Family †Djadochtatheriidae Kielan-Jaworowska $ Hurum, 1997
      - Genus †Djadochtatherium Simpson, 1925
        - Species †D. matthewi Simpson, 1925[Catopsalis matthewi Simpson, 1925]
      - Genus †Catopsbaatar Kielan-Jaworowska, 1974
        - Species †C. catopsaloides (Kielan-Jaworowska, 1974) Kielan-Jaworowska, 1994 [Djadochtatherium catopsaloides Kielan-Jaworowska, 1974]
      - Genus †Tombaatar Kielan-Jaworowska, 1974
        - Species †T. sabuli Rougier, Novacek & Dashzeveg, 1997
      - Genus †Kryptobaatar Kielan-Jaworowska, 1970 [Gobibaatar Kielan-Jaworowska, 1970, Tugrigbaatar Kielan-Jaworowska & Dashzeveg, 1978]
        - Species †K. saichanensis Kielan-Jaworowska & Dashzeveg, 1978 [Tugrigbaatar saichaenensis Kielan-Jaworowska & Dashzeveg, 1978??]
        - Species †K. dashzevegi Kielan-Jaworowska, 1970
        - Species †K. mandahuensis Smith, Guo & Sun, 2001
        - Species †K. gobiensis Kielan-Jaworowska, 1970 [Gobibaatar parvus Kielan-Jaworowska, 1970 ]

=== Phylogeny ===
After Chimento et al. 2015:

- Multituberculata
  - Paulchoffatiidae
  - - Plagiaulacidae
    - - Eobaataridae
      - - Gondwanatheria
          - Ferugliotheriidae
          - - Groeberiidae
            - Sudamericidae
        - Cimolodonta
          - Cimolodontidae
          - - Ptilodontoidea
            - - - Cimexomys
                - Cimolomyidae
              - - Boffius
                - Buginbaatar
                - Eucosmodontidae
                - Microcosmodontidae
                - Djadochtatherioidea
                  - Bulganbaatar
                  - - - Chulsanbaatar
                      - Sloanbaataridae
                    - - Nemegtbaatar
                      - Djadochtatheriidae
                - - Kogaionidae
                  - Taeniolabidoidea
                    - Yubaatar
                    - - Bubodens
                      - - Valenopsalis
                        - - Lambdopsalidae
                          - Taeniolabididae

Cladogram after Carvalho et al. 2025:

- Multituberculata
  - - Pinheirodontidae
    - Paulchoffatiidae
  - - Glirodon
    - - Ctenacodon
      - - Zofiabaatar
        - - Bolodon
          - - Plagiaulax
            - - Eobaataridae
              - - Arginbaatar
                - Cimolodonta

== Palaeobiology ==
=== Behaviour ===
Multituberculates are some of the earliest mammals to display complex social behaviours. One species, Filikomys, from the Late Cretaceous of North America, engaged in multi-generational group nesting and burrowing.

=== Life history ===
Osteohistological evidence in the form of differential proportions of bone tissue types indicative of length of lactation periods suggests that multituberculates had life history strategies more closely resembling those of placental mammals than those of marsupials.

=== Extinction ===
The extinction of multituberculates has been a topic of controversy for several decades. After at least 88 million years of dominance over most mammalian assemblies, multituberculates reached the peak of their diversity in the early Palaeocene, before gradually declining across the final stages of the epoch and the Eocene, finally disappearing in the early Oligocene.

The last multituberculate species, Ectypodus childei, went extinct near the end of the Eocene in North America. It is unclear why this particular species persisted for so long when all of its counterparts succumbed to replacement by rodents.

Traditionally, the extinction of multituberculates has been linked to the rise of rodents (and, to a lesser degree, earlier placental competitors like hyopsodonts and Plesiadapiformes), which supposedly competitively excluded multituberculates from most mammalian faunas. Adams et al. (2019) argued in favor of this hypothesis as rodents have a higher bite force than multituberculates, which would have given them access to harder, drier seeds which were becoming more abundant and had a greater range of food compared to multituberculates. The authors also argued rodents had was longer gestation periods and larger neonates which gave them a competitive advantage over multituberculates. In addition, they believed the diversity of new predators such as owls, creodonts, and carnivorans, also played a role in their extinction.

However, the idea that multituberculates were competitively replaced by rodents and other placentals has been criticised by several authors. For one thing, it relies on the assumption that these mammals are "inferior" to more derived placentals, and ignores the fact that rodents and multituberculates had co-existed for at least 15 million years. According to some researchers, multituberculate "decline" is shaped by sharp extinction events, most notably after the Tiffanian, where a sudden drop in diversity occurs. Finally, the youngest known multituberculates do not exemplify patterns of competitive exclusion; the Oligocene Ectypodus is a rather generalistic species, rather than a specialist. This suggests that multituberculates simply could not cope with climatic and vegetation changes, as well as the rise of new predatory eutherians, such as miacids. However, rodents probably still played a role in their decline.

More recent studies show a mixed effect. Multituberculate faunas in North America and Europe do indeed decline in correlation to the introduction of rodents in these areas. However, Asian multituberculate faunas co-existed with rodents with minimal extinction events, implying that competition was not the main cause for the extinction of Asiatic multituberculates. As a whole, it seems that Asian multituberculates, unlike North American and European species, never recovered from the KT event, which allowed the evolution and propagation of rodents in the first place. A recent study seems to indeed indicate that eutherians recovered more quickly from the KT event than multituberculates. Conversely, another study has shown that placental radiation did not start significantly until after the decline of multituberculates.

However, competitive replacement among North American species has been called into question by Benjamin John Burger in his 2025 study. He suggests the extinction of multituberculates in North America was correlated to the decline of boreal forests that were dominated by dawn redwoods and Chinese swamp cypress. The analysis suggested that multituberculates avoided pine and spruce-dominated forests despite having similar geographic distributions to those trees. However, Burger argues competitive replacements by seed-eating passerine birds such as songbirds, and several mammalian groups such as paromomyids, may have played a role in the extinction of multituberculates, although this requires more testing.

== Sources ==
- Agustí, Jordi; Antón, Mauricio (2002). Mammoths, Sabertooths, and Hominids: 65 Millions Years of Mammalian Evolution in Europe. New York: Columbia University Press. ISBN 978-0-231-11640-4.
- Dykes, Trevor. "Multituberculata (Cope 1884)". Archived from the original on December 28, 2009.
- Kielan-Jaworowska, Zofia; Hurum, Jørn H. (2001). "Phylogeny and Systematics of multituberculate mammals" (PDF). Palaeontology. 44 (3): 389–429. Bibcode:2001Palgy..44..389K. doi:10.1111/1475-4983.00185. S2CID 83592270.
