= Arginbaatar =

Arginbaatar Temporal range: Early Cretaceous, Aptian–Albian

Scientific classification
- Domain: Eukaryota
- Kingdom: Animalia
- Phylum: Chordata
- Class: Mammalia
- Order: †Multituberculata
- Suborder: †Plagiaulacida
- Family: †Arginbaataridae
- Genus: †Arginbaatar
- Species: †A. dmitrievae

Binomial name
- †Arginbaatar dmitrievae Trofimov, 1980

Extinct family of mammals

Arginbaatar is a genus of extinct mammal from the Lower Cretaceous of Mongolia. It was a member of the Multituberculata, an order which is also extinct. It belongs to the family Arginbaataridae (Hahn & Hahn 1983). The genus Arginbaatar was named by Trofimov B.A. in 1980. Baatar is Mongolian for "hero" or "warrior."

The primary species, Arginbaatar dmitrievae, was also named by Trofimov. The fossil remains date to the Aptian or Albian (Lower Cretaceous) Dzunbain Formation of Mongolia.

This genus is the only known member of its family, which is thus monotypic. Some characteristics are "Plagiaulacida"-like, while others are more akin to the further derived suborder of Cimolodonta. Exactly where it fits in is unclear. "This family shows a mixture of 'plagiaulacidan' and cimolodontan characters" (Kielan-Jaworowska & Hurum, 2001, p. 415).
