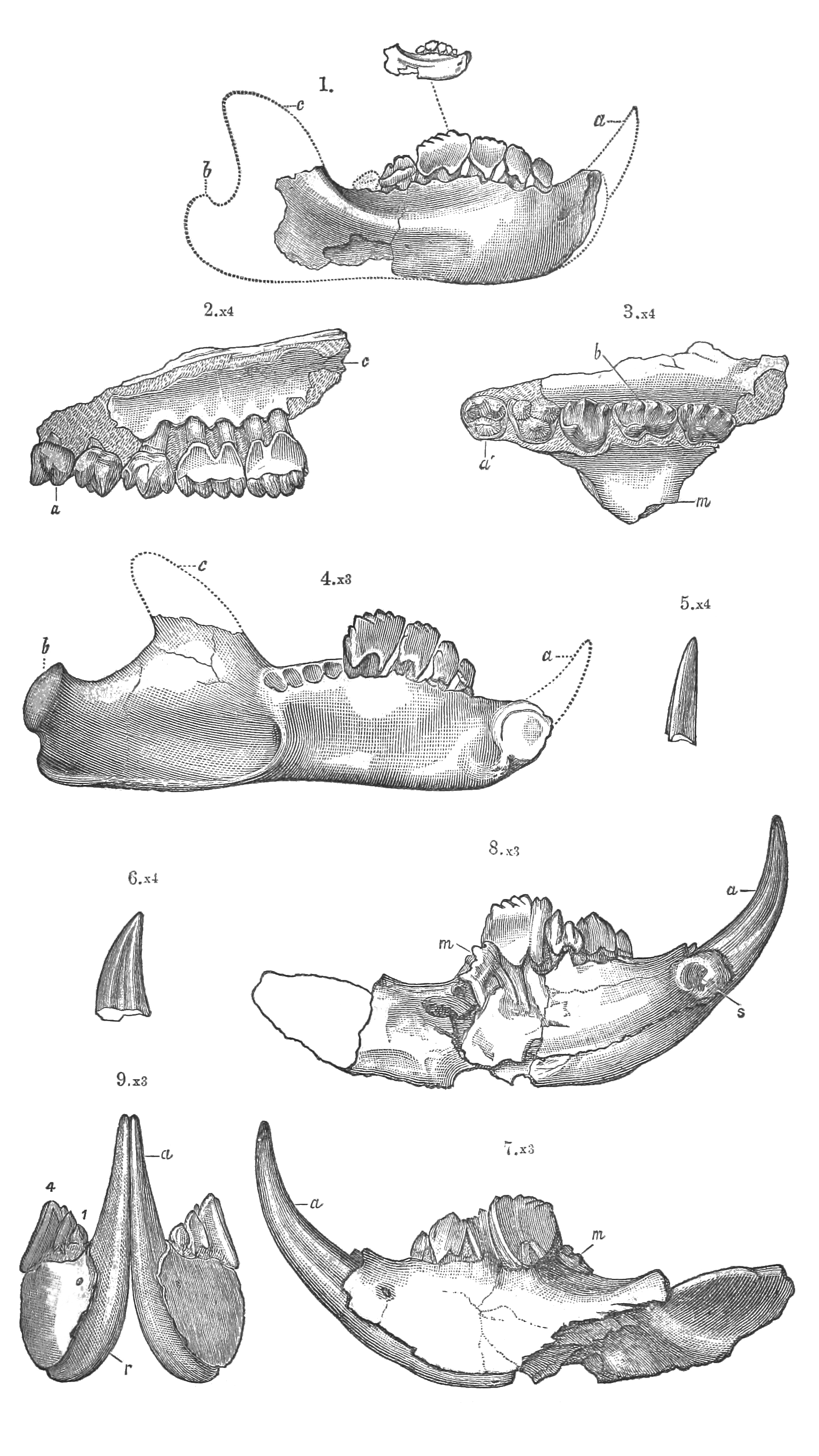
- Lower jaws of allodontids

Scientific classification
- Kingdom: Animalia
- Phylum: Chordata
- Class: Mammalia
- Order: †Multituberculata
- Suborder: †Plagiaulacida
- Family: †Allodontidae; Marsh, 1889

Genera
- †Ctenacodon; †Psalodon

= Allodontidae =

Allodontidae Temporal range: Late Jurassic

Extinct family of mammals

Allodontidae (from ancient Greek "ἄλλος" "ὀδούς", "different tooth") is a family of extinct multituberculate mammals that lived in what is now North America during the Upper Jurassic period. They were relatively early mammals and are within the informal suborder of "Plagiaulacida". The family was named by Othniel Charles Marsh in 1889. Two genera are recognized: Ctenacodon and Psalodon.
