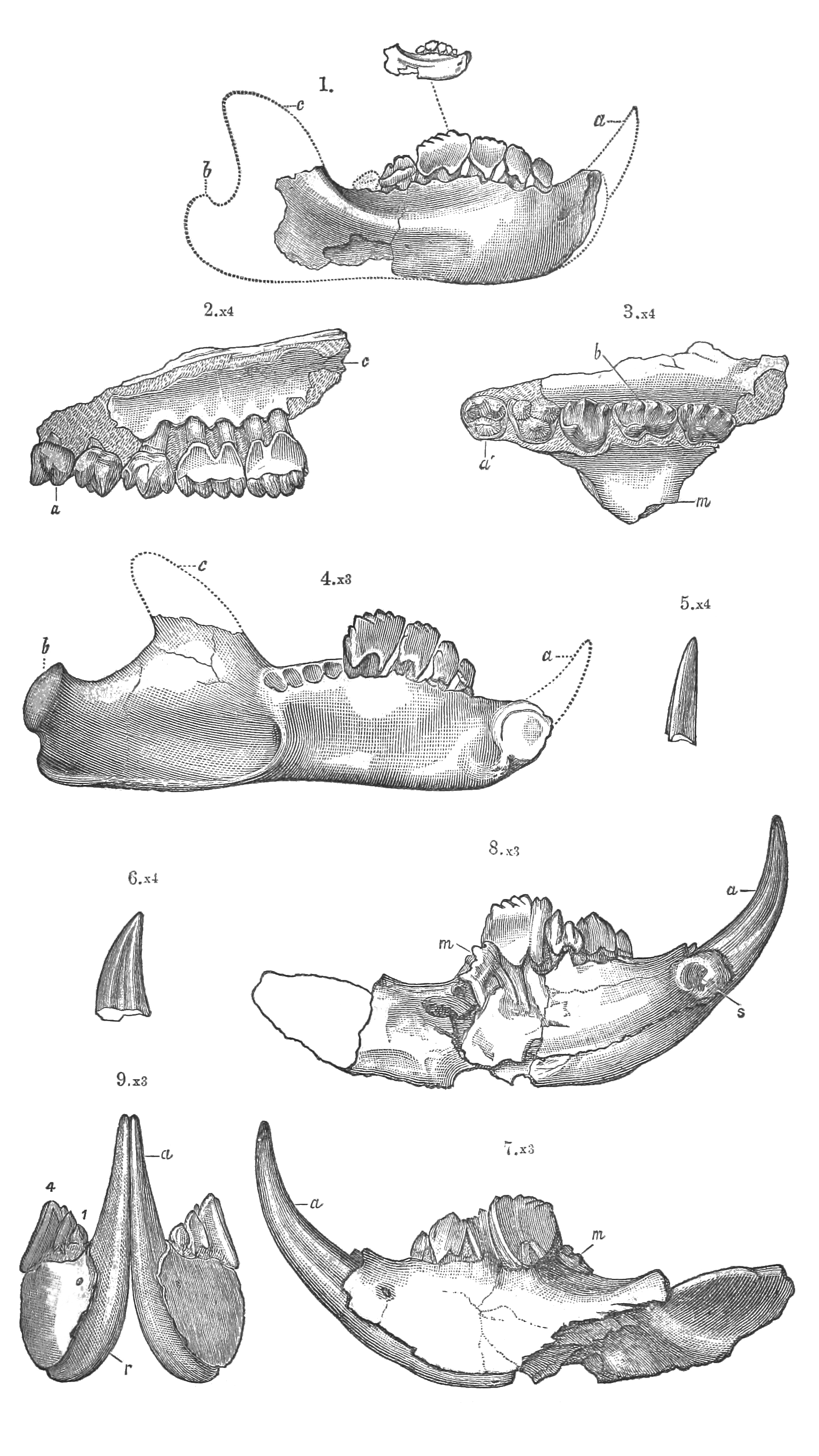
- Lower and upper jaws

Scientific classification
- Kingdom: Animalia
- Phylum: Chordata
- Class: Mammalia
- Order: †Multituberculata
- Family: †Allodontidae
- Genus: †Ctenacodon; Marsh, 1879

Species
- †C. laticeps (Marsh, 1881); †C. scindens Simpson, 1928; †C. serratus Marsh, 1879 (type)

= Ctenacodon =

Ctenacodon Temporal range: Late Jurassic

Extinct genus of rodent-like mammals

Ctenacodon is a genus of extinct mammal that lived in what is now North America during the Upper Jurassic period. It is a member of the family Allodontidae within the order Multituberculata. Ctenacodon, also known as Allodon (Marsh 1881), was named by Othniel Charles Marsh in 1879. At least three species are currently recognized.

Present in stratigraphic zone 5. Remains possibly referrable to Ctenacodon have been recovered from stratigraphic zone 2.

== Species ==
The species Ctenacodon laticeps was named by Marsh in 1881 and Simpson G.G. in 1927. It has also been known as Allodon laticeps (Marsh 1881). Remains were found in the Upper Jurassic strata of the Morrison Formation in Wyoming (United States). The holotype, collected by Reed W.H. in 1880, is in the Peabody Museum of Natural History at Yale University.

The species Ctenacodon scindens was named by Simpson G.G. in 1928. Remains were found in Jurassic strata of the Morrison Formation of Wyoming. This species was originally assigned to C. serratus.

The species Ctenacodon serratus, also named by Marsh in 1879, is also known from the Morrison Formation.
