= List of the Cenozoic life of North Dakota =

This list of the Cenozoic life of North Dakota contains the various prehistoric life-forms whose fossilized remains have been reported from within the US state of North Dakota and are between 66 million and 10,000 years of age.

== A ==
- Acer
- †Acrovena – type locality for genus
  - †Acrovena laevis – type locality for species
- †Actinodonta
- †Adjidaumo
  - †Adjidaumo minimus
  - †Adjidaumo minutus
- †Aesculus
  - †Aesculus hickeyi – type locality for species
- †Agnotocastor
  - †Agnotocastor praetereadens
- †Aletodon
  - †Aletodon quadravus
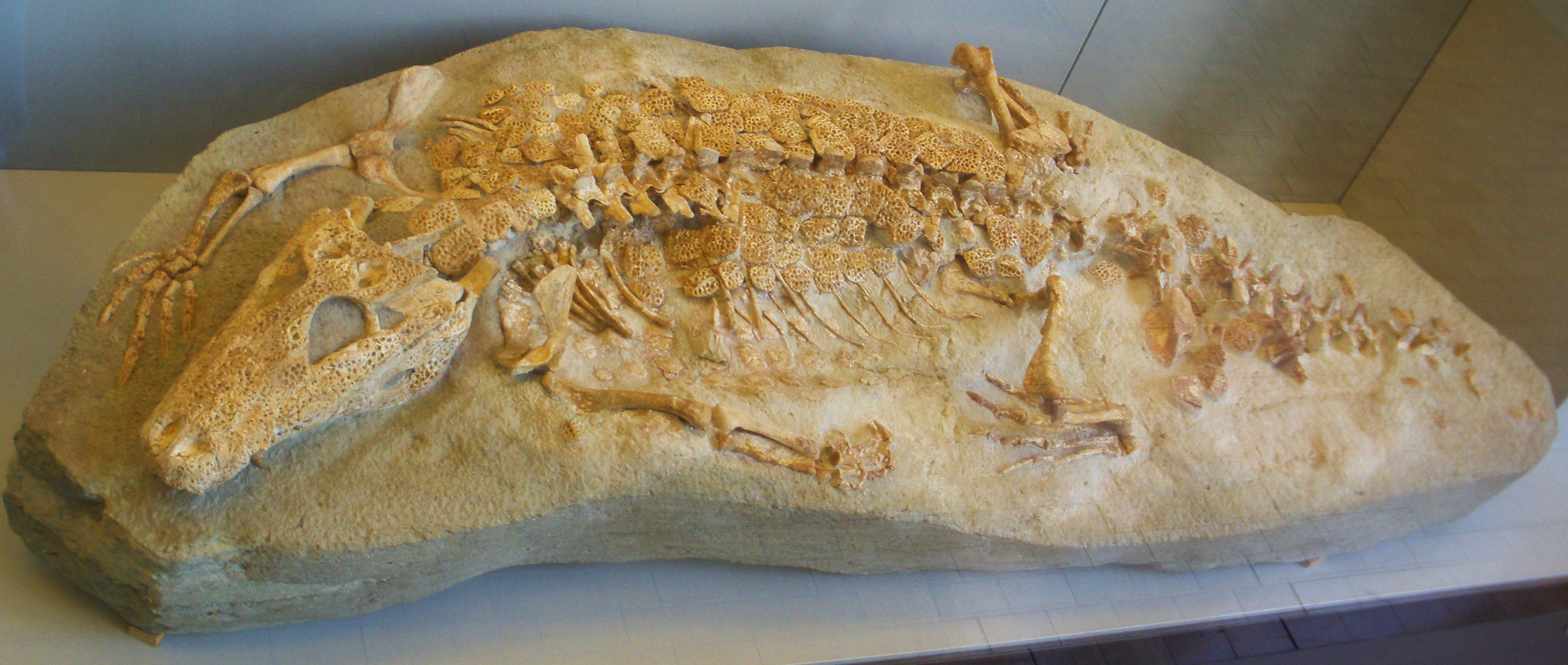
- Fossilized skeleton of the Late Cretaceous-Oligocene Alligator relative Allognathosuchus
  †Allognathosuchus – type locality for genus
  - †Allognathosuchus mlynarskii – type locality for species
- †Altasciurus
  - †Altasciurus leonardi – type locality for species
- †Alveugena
  - †Alveugena carbonensis
- †Amersinia
  - †Amersinia FU082 informal
  - †Amersinia FU82 informal
- †Amesoneuron
  - †Amesoneuron FU037 informal
- Amia
  - †Amia fragosa
  - †Amia uintaensis
- †Ampelopsis
  - †Ampelopsis acerifolia
- †Amphicaenopus
  - †Amphicaenopus platycephalus
- †Ankylodon – or unidentified comparable form
- †Apternodus
- †Archaeocyon
  - †Archaeocyon leptodus
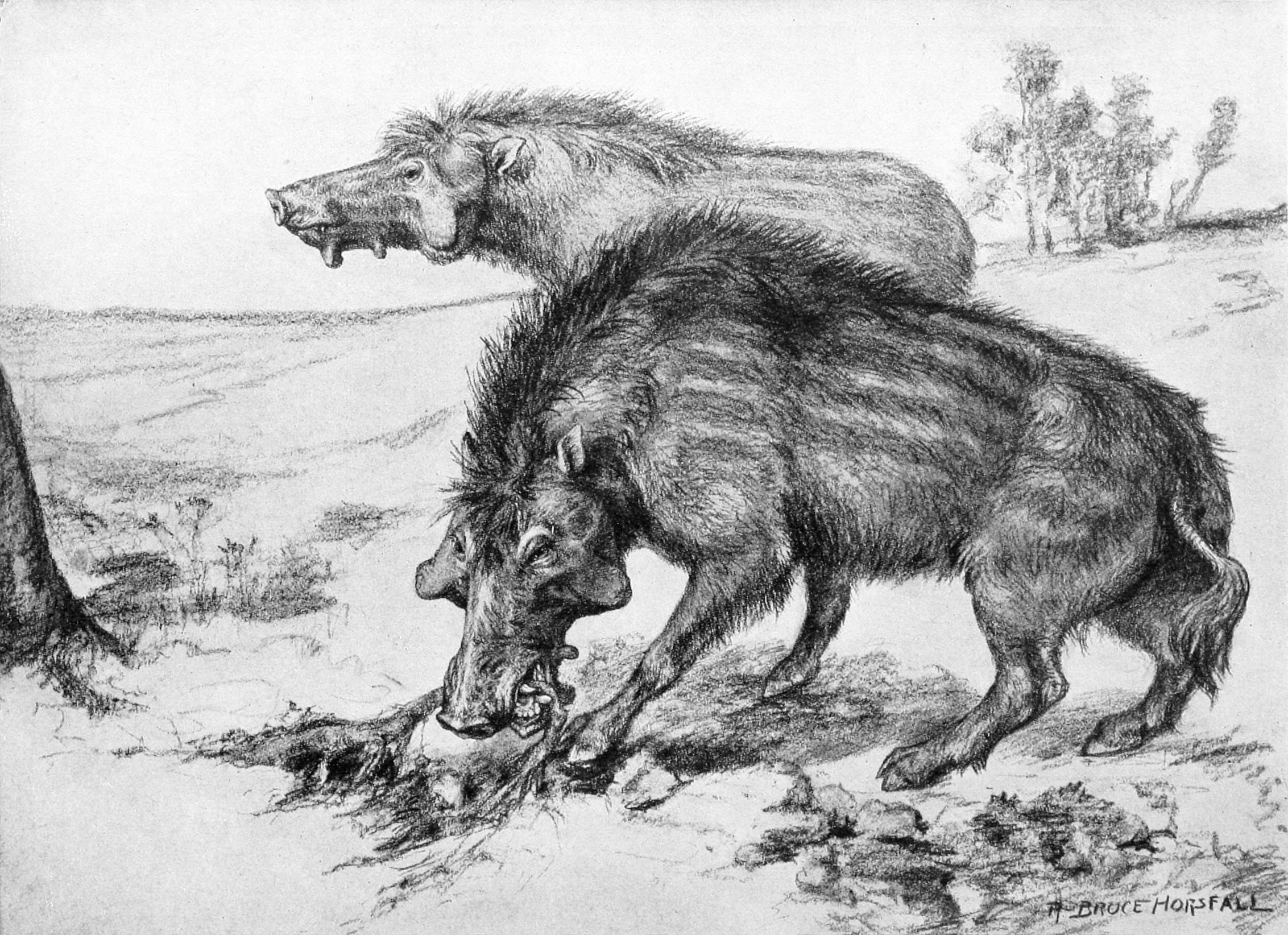
- Life restoration of the Eocene-Oligocene entelodont mammal Archaeotherium
  †Archaeotherium
  - †Archaeotherium mortoni
- †Arctocyon
- †Ardynomys
  - †Ardynomys saskatchewensis
- †Averrhoites
  - †Averrhoites affinis
- †Axestemys
  - †Axestemys montinsana
- Azolla
  - †Azolla montana
  - †Azolla stanleyi – type locality for species
- †Azollopsis
  - †Azollopsis tomentosa

== B ==
- †Bathycyathus
  - †Bathycyathus lloydi – type locality for species
- †Batrachosauroides
  - †Batrachosauroides gotoi – type locality for species
- †Beringiaphyllum – report made of unidentified related form or using admittedly obsolete nomenclature
  - †Beringiaphyllum cupanioides
- †Bessoecetor
  - †Bessoecetor septentrionalis
- Betula
  - †Betula hesterna – type locality for species
- †Bisonalveus
  - †Bisonalveus holtzmani
- †Borealosuchus
  - †Borealosuchus formidabilis – type locality for species
- †Boremys
- †Bothriodon
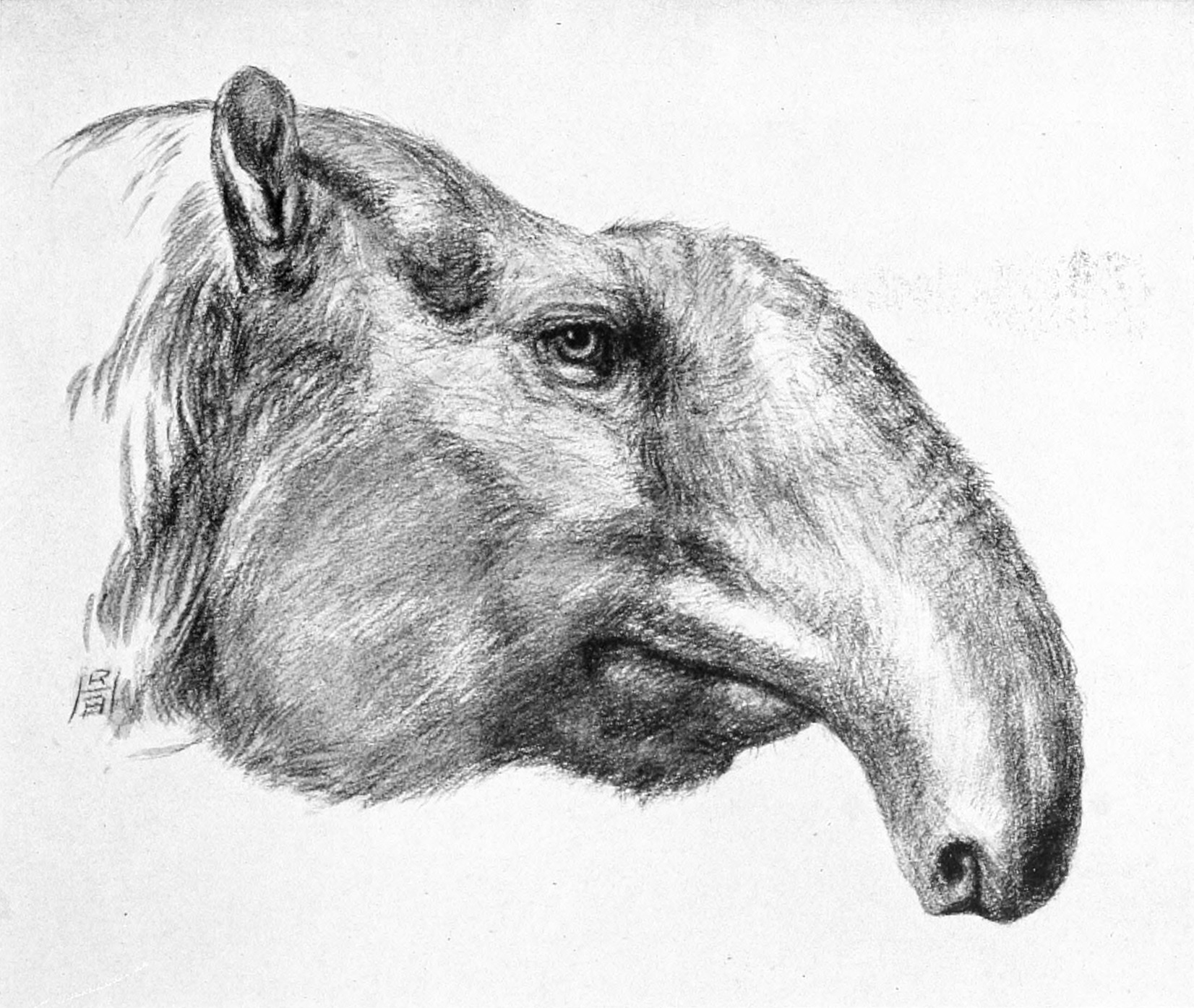
- Restorative portrait of the Miocene oreodont mammal Brachycrus
  †Brachycrus
- †Browniea
  - †Browniea serrata

== C ==
- †Cabomba
  - †Cabomba inermis
- †Calamagras
  - †Calamagras weigeli
- †Canariophyllum – type locality for genus
  - †Canariophyllum ampla – type locality for species
- Canticocculus
- †Cantius
  - †Cantius frugivorus
- †Carpites
  - †Carpites verrucosus
- †Carpodaptes
  - †Carpodaptes hazelae – or unidentified comparable form
  - †Carpodaptes hobackensis – or unidentified comparable form
- †Carpolithes
  - †Carpolithes arcticus
  - †Carpolithes bryangosus – type locality for species
  - †Carpolithes lunatus – type locality for species
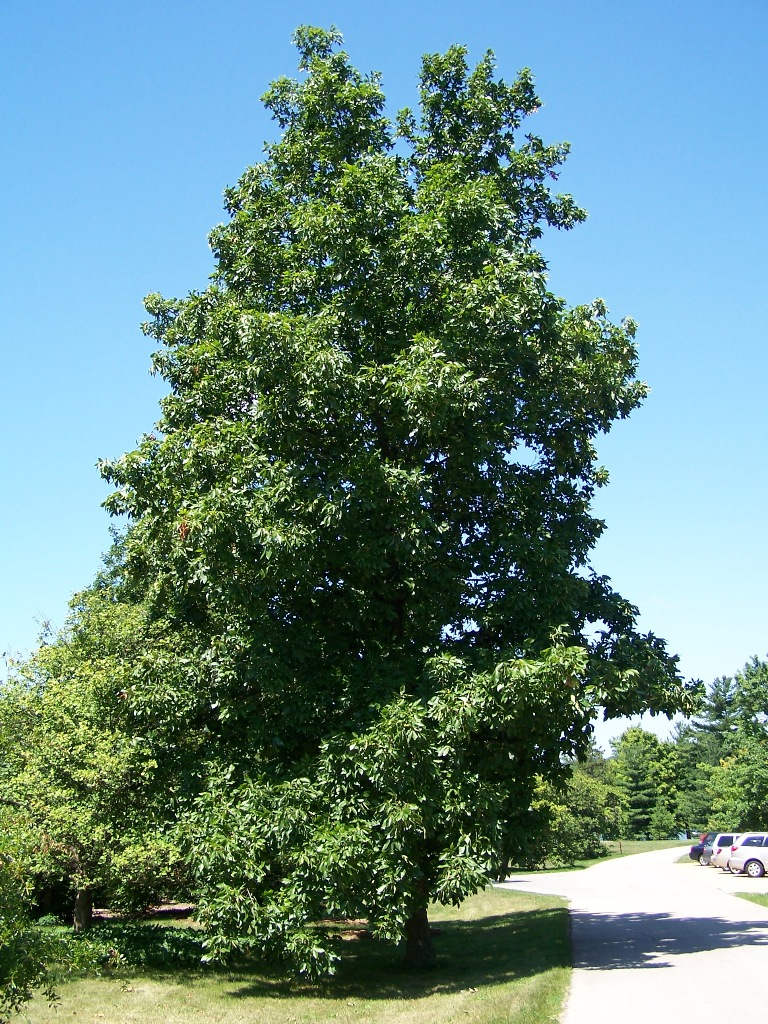
- A living Carya, or hickory tree
  Carya
  - †Carya antiquorum
- †Cedromus
  - †Cedromus wardi
- Celtis
  - †Celtis aspera
- †Centetodon
  - †Centetodon chadronensis
  - †Centetodon magnus
  - †Centetodon marginalis
- †Centimanomys
- †Ceratophyllum
  - †Ceratophyllum FU080 informal
- Cercidiphyllum
  - †Cercidiphyllum arcticum
  - †Cercidiphyllum articum
  - †Cercidiphyllum ellipticum
  - †Cercidiphyllum genetrix
- †Chaetoptelea
  - †Chaetoptelea microphylla
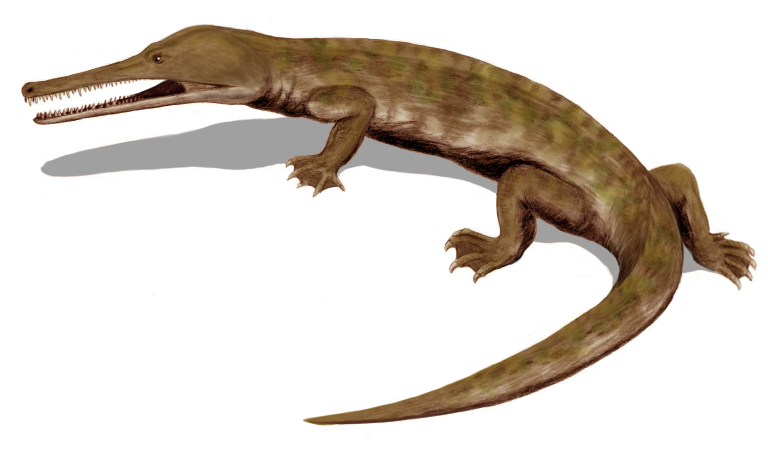
- Life restoration of the Late Cretaceous-Eocene choristoderan reptile Champsosaurus
  †Champsosaurus
  - †Champsosaurus gigas – type locality for species
  - †Champsosaurus tenuis – type locality for species
- †Chrysotriton – type locality for genus
  - †Chrysotriton tiheni – type locality for species
- Cocculus
  - †Cocculus flabella
- †Coniophis
- †Conoryctella
  - †Conoryctella dragonensis – or unidentified comparable form
- †Cornophyllum
  - †Cornophyllum newberryi
- Cornus
  - †Cornus hyperborea
- †Corylus
  - †Corylus acutertiaria – type locality for species
  - †Corylus FU079 informal
  - †Corylus insignis
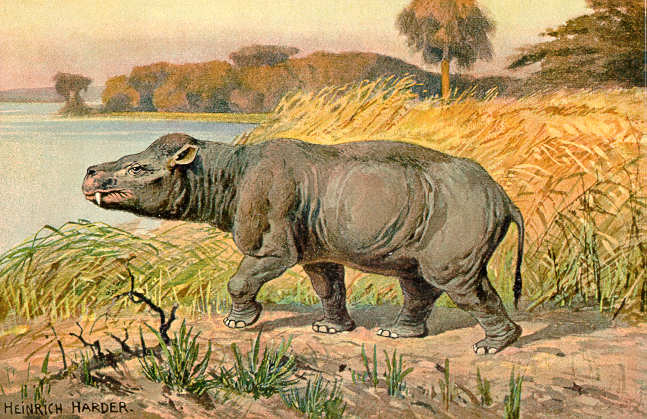
- Life restoration of the Paleocene-Eocene pantodont mammal Coryphodon. Heinrich Harder (1920).
  †Coryphodon
  - †Coryphodon armatus – or unidentified comparable form
- †Cotradechites – type locality for genus
  - †Cotradechites lithinus – type locality for species
- †Credneria
  - †Credneria daturaefolia – tentative report
- †Cupressinocladus
  - †Cupressinocladus interruptus
- Cyclocarya
  - †Cyclocarya brownii
- †Cylindrodon
  - †Cylindrodon collinus
- †Cyperacites
- †Cypressaurus

== D ==
- †Dakotornis – type locality for genus
  - †Dakotornis cooperi – type locality for species
- Life restoration of the Eocene-Miocene bear dog Daphoenus
  †Daphoenus
- †Davidia
  - †Davidia antiqua
- †Dennstaedtia
  - †Dennstaedtia americana
- †Diacocherus
  - †Diacocherus minutus
- †Diacodexis – tentative report
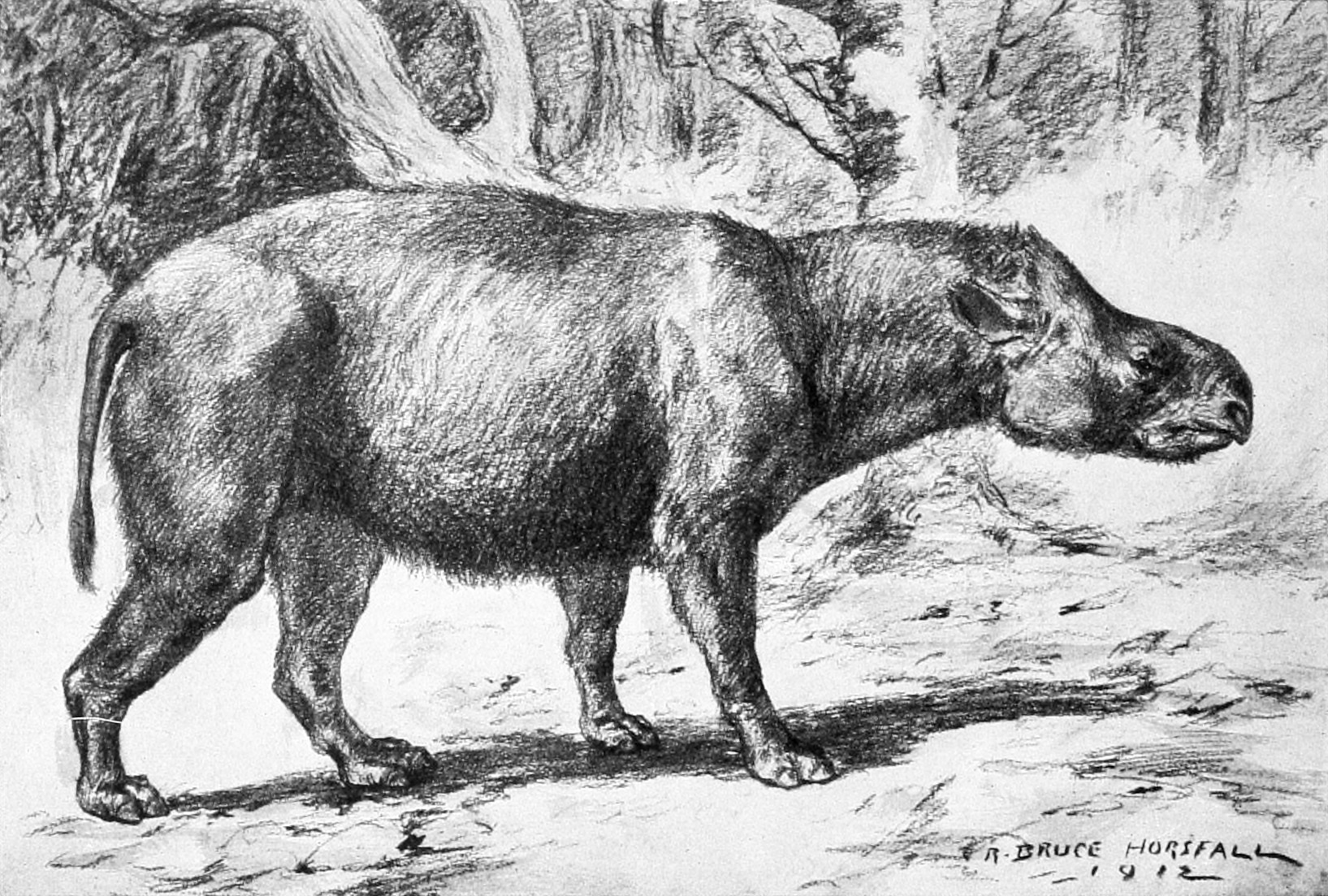
- Restoration of the Oligocene-Miocene hornless rhinoceros Diceratherium. Robert Bruce Horsfall (1913).
  †Diceratherium
  - †Diceratherium tridactylum
- Dicotylophyllum
  - †Dicotylophyllum anomalum
  - †Dicotylophyllum hamameloides – type locality for species
  - †Dicotylophyllum hebronensis – type locality for species
  - †Dicotylophyllum mercerensis – type locality for species
  - †Dicotylophyllum oblongatum – type locality for species
- †Didelphodus – or unidentified comparable form
- †Didymictis
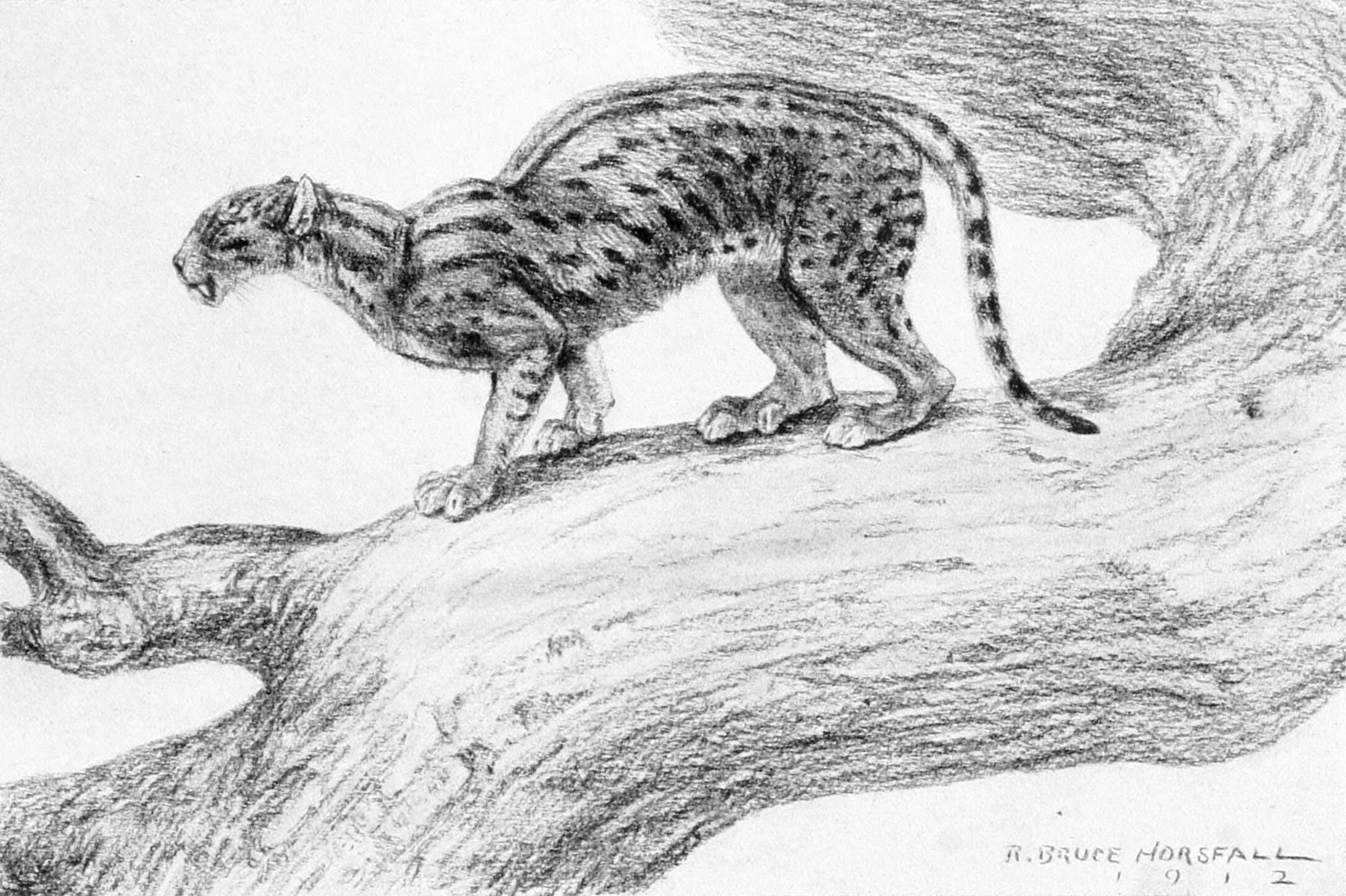
- Life restoration of the Eocene-Miocene false saber-toothed cat Dinictis. Robert Bruce Horsfall (1913).
  †Dinictis
- †Dissacus
- †Dombeya
  - †Dombeya novimundi – type locality for species
- †Domnina
  - †Domnina sagittariensis – type locality for species
  - †Domnina thompsoni – or unidentified comparable form
- †Dorraletes
  - †Dorraletes diminutivus
- †Douglassciurus
  - †Douglassciurus jeffersoni
- †Drepanochilus – tentative report

== E ==
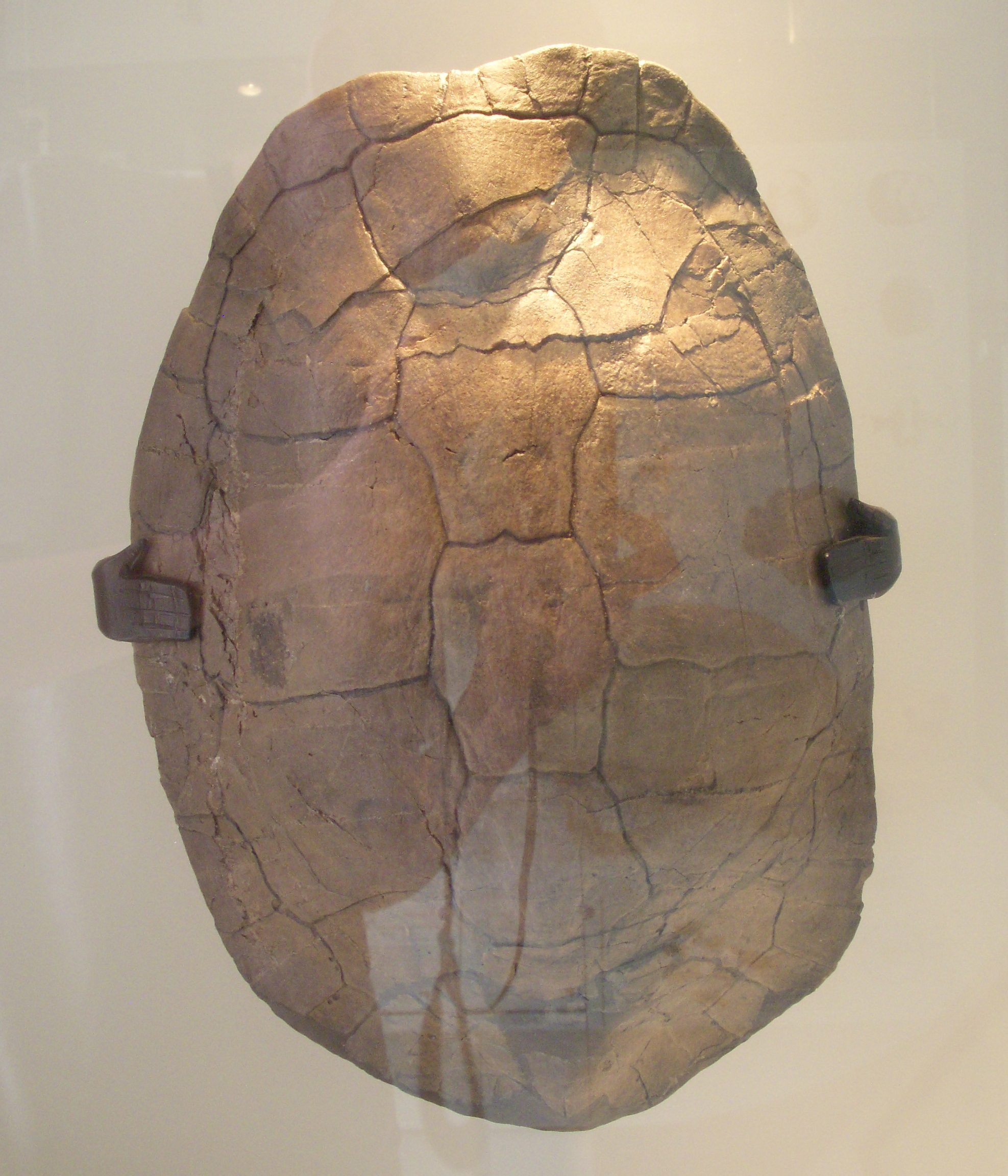
- Fossilized shell of the Eocene turtle Echmatemys
  †Echmatemys
  - †Echmatemys testudinea
- †Ectocion
  - †Ectocion collinus
- †Ectypodus
  - †Ectypodus hazeni
  - †Ectypodus lovei
- †Elliptio
  - †Elliptio priscus
- †Elomeryx
  - †Elomeryx armatus
- †Entomolestes
- †Equisetum
  - †Equisetum FU036 informal
  - †Equisetum magnum – type locality for species
- †Eucommia
  - †Eucommia serrata
- †Eumys
  - †Eumys brachyodus
  - †Eumys elegans
  - †Eumys lammersi – type locality for species
- †Eutypomys
  - †Eutypomys hibernodus – type locality for species
  - †Eutypomys parvus

== F ==
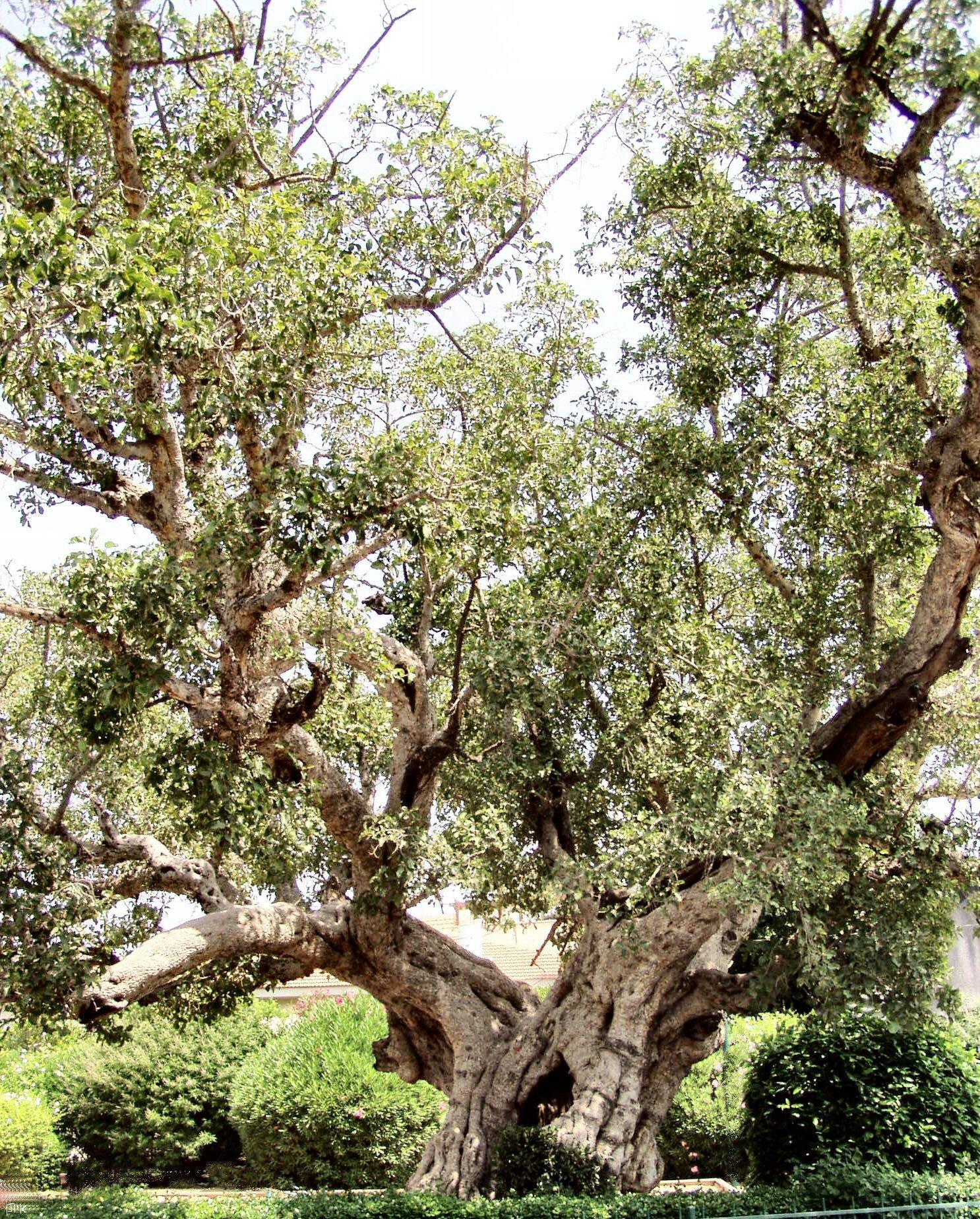
- A living Ficus, or fig tree
  Ficus
  - †Ficus subtruncata
- †Fokieniopsis
  - †Fokieniopsis catenulata
- †Fraxinus
  - †Fraxinus eocenica

== G ==
- Ginkgo
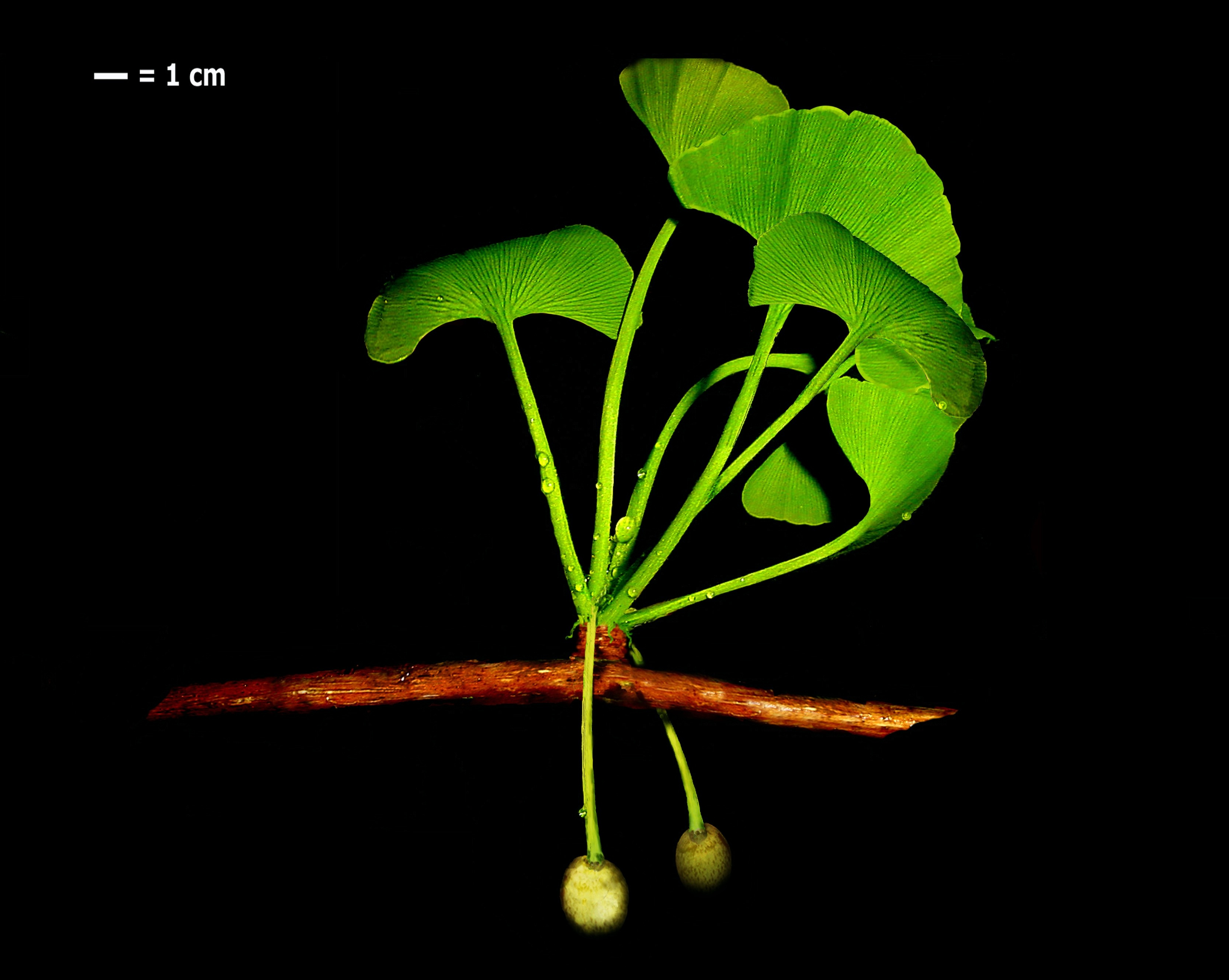
  - Restored foliage of the Late Cretaceous-Miocene ginkgo tree Ginkgo adiantoides
    †Ginkgo adiantoides
- Glyptostrobus
  - †Glyptostrobus europaeus
  - †Glyptostrobus nordenskioldi
- †Gomphaeschna
  - †Gomphaeschna schrankii – type locality for species

== H ==
- †Harmsia
  - †Harmsia hydrocotyloidea
- †Heliscomys
  - †Heliscomys borealis – type locality for species
  - †Heliscomys medius – or unidentified comparable form
  - †Heliscomys senex
  - †Heliscomys vetus – or unidentified comparable form
- †Helodermoides
- Hemitelia
  - †Hemitelia magna
- †Herpetotherium
  - †Herpetotherium fugax – or unidentified comparable form
  - †Herpetotherium valens
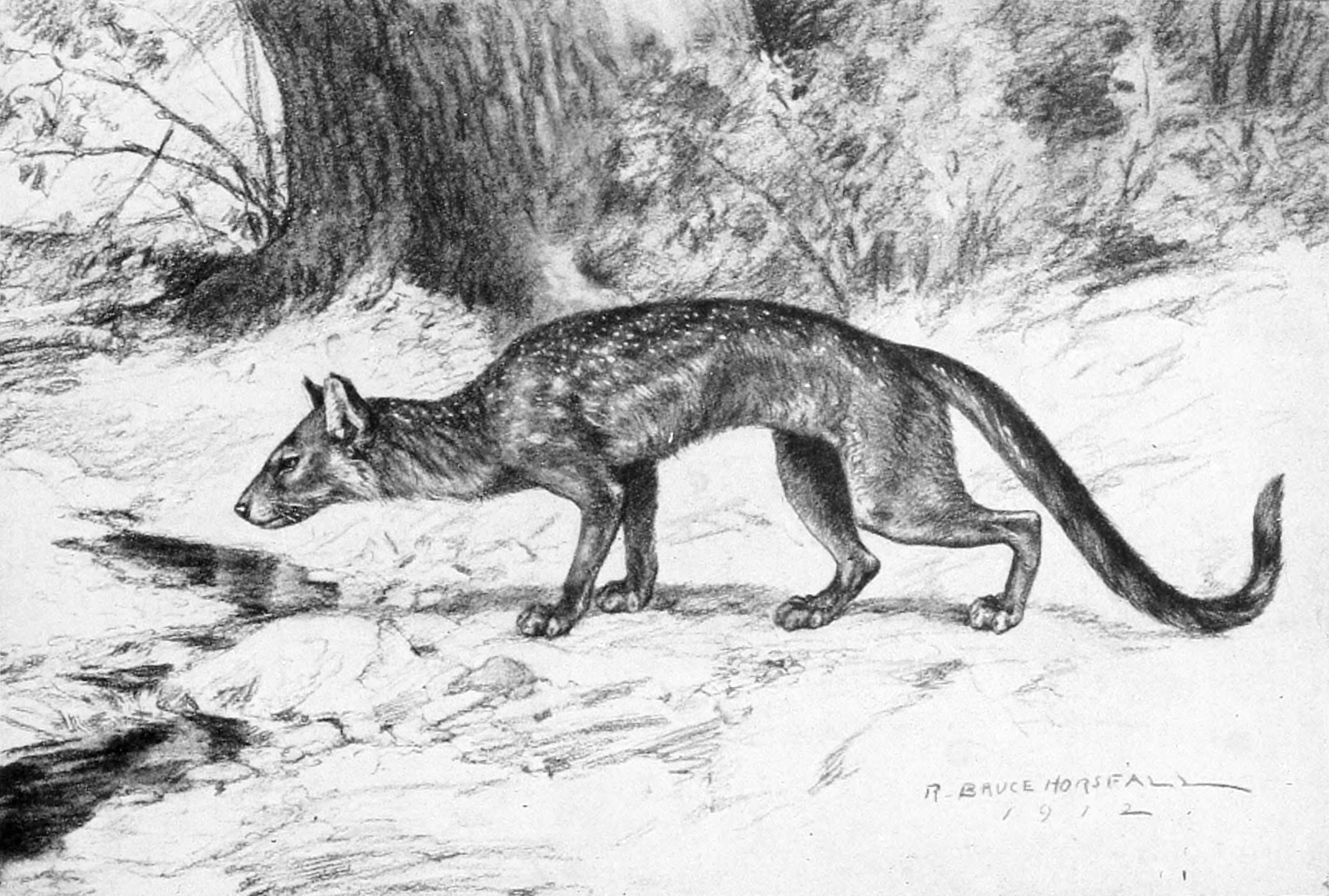
- Life restoration of the Eocene-Oligocene dog Hesperocyon. Robert Bruce Horsfall (1913).
  †Hesperocyon
  - †Hesperocyon gregarius
- †Hesperopetes
  - †Hesperopetes blacki – or unidentified comparable form
- †Homogalax
  - †Homogalax aureus – type locality for species
- †Hydromystria
  - †Hydromystria expansa
- †Hyopsodus
  - †Hyopsodus loomisi
- †Hypertragulus
- †Hyracodon

== I ==
- †Ignacius
  - †Ignacius frugivorus
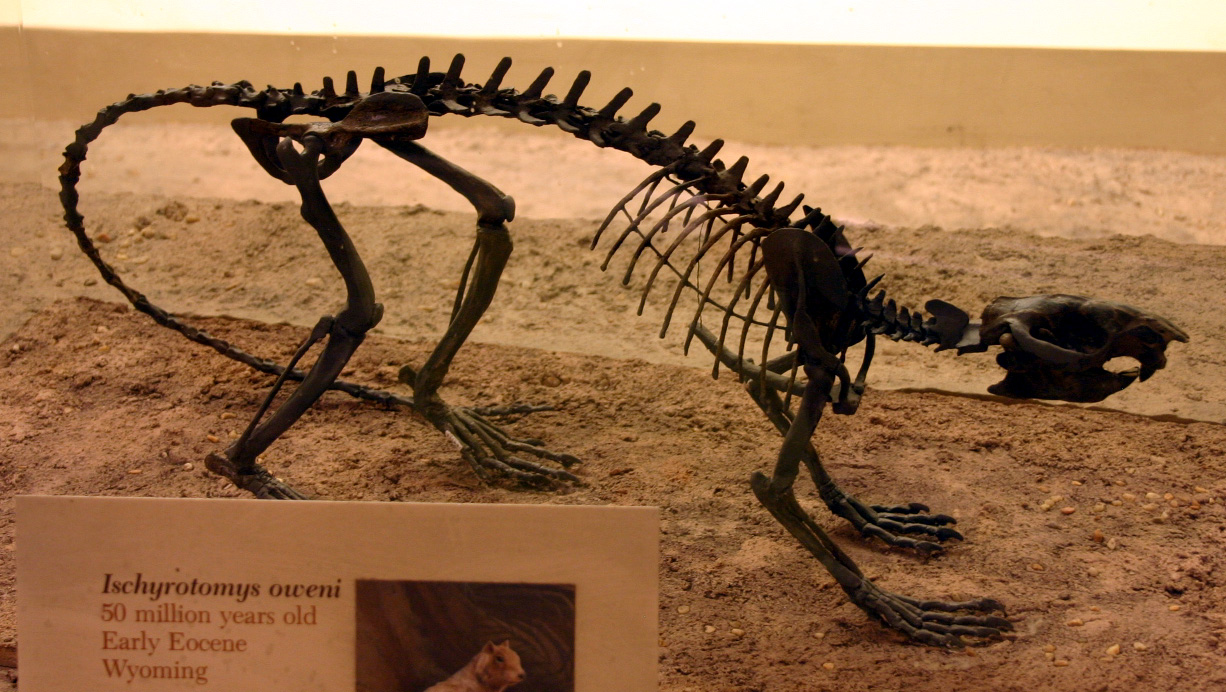
- Mounted fossilized skeleton of the Eocene-Oligocene rodent Ischyromys
  †Ischyromys
  - †Ischyromys junctus
  - †Ischyromys typus
  - †Ischyromys veterior – or unidentified comparable form
- †Isoetites
  - †Isoetites horridus

== J ==
- †Joffrichthys
  - †Joffrichthys triangulpterus – type locality for species
- Juglans
  - †Juglans taurina

== K ==
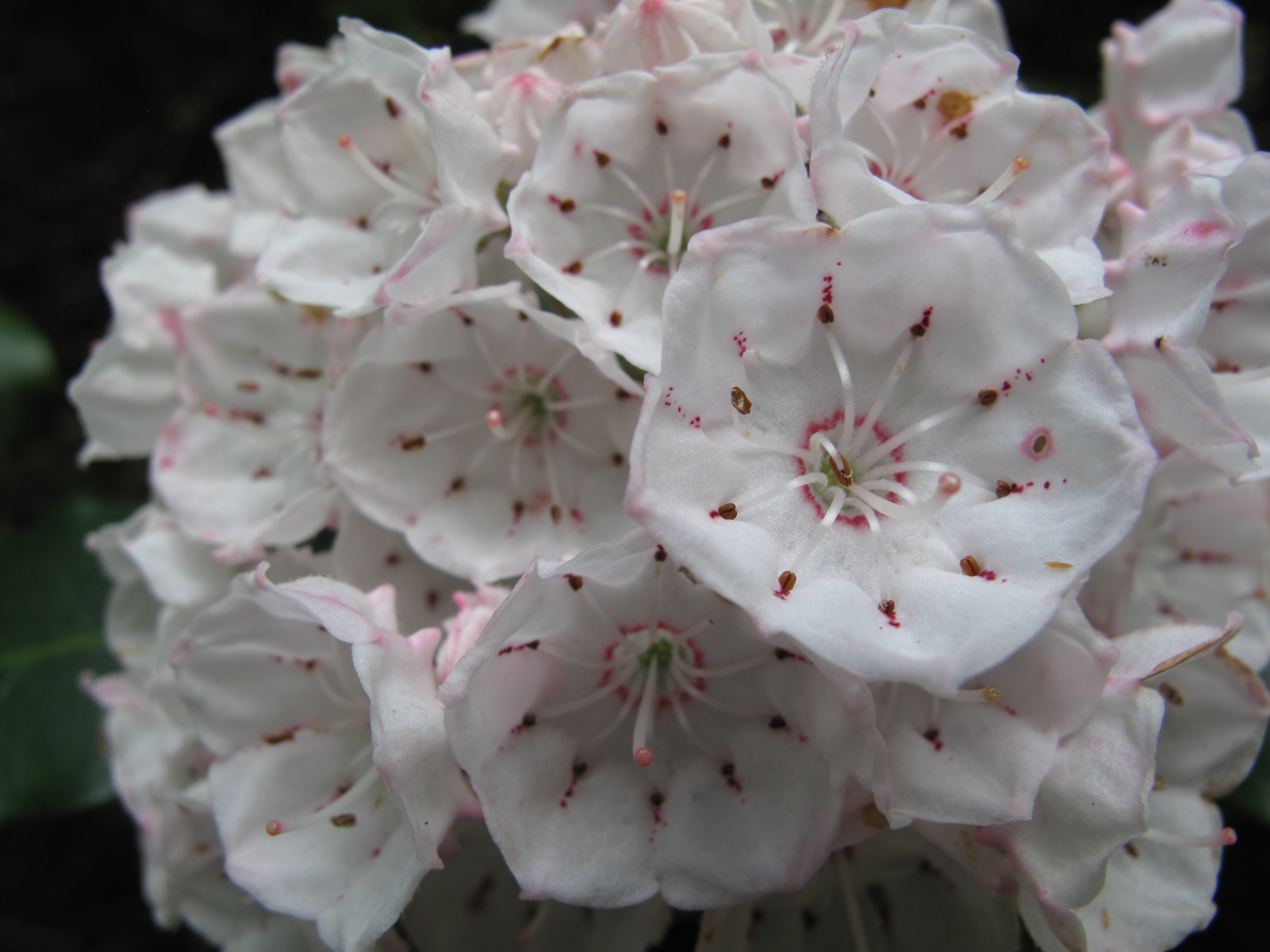
- Flowers of a living Kalmia shrub
  †Kalmia – report made of unidentified related form or using admittedly obsolete nomenclature
  - †Kalmia elliptica
- †Kirkomys

== L ==
- †Labidolemur
  - †Labidolemur soricoides
- †Lemnaceae
  - †Lemnaceae scutatum
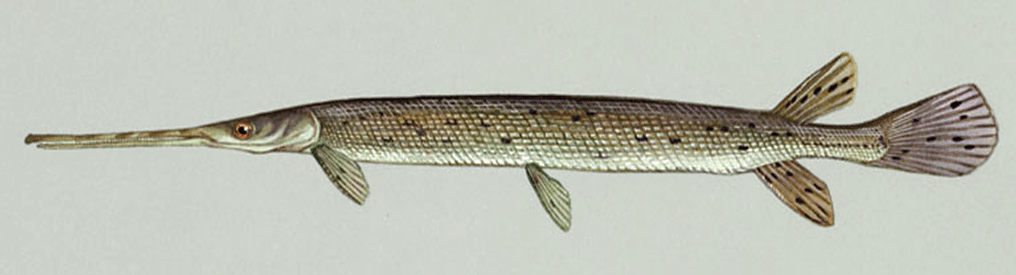
- Illustration of a living Lepisosteus, or gar
  Lepisosteus
  - †Lepisosteus occidentalis
- †Leptacodon
  - †Leptacodon tener
- †Leptauchenia
  - †Leptauchenia decora
- †Leptictis
  - †Leptictis acutidens – or unidentified comparable form
  - †Leptictis dakotensis
- †Leptodontomys
  - †Leptodontomys douglassi
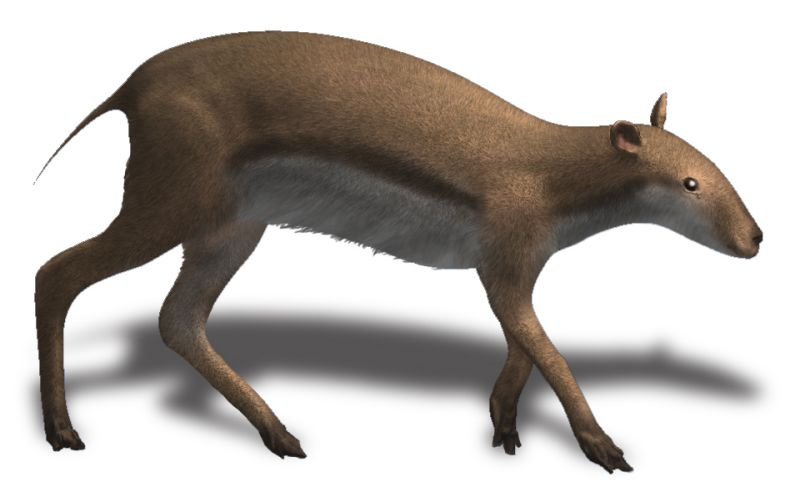
- Life restoration of the Eocene-Oligocene even-toed ungulate Leptomeryx
  †Leptomeryx
  - †Leptomeryx evansi
  - †Leptomeryx yoderi – or unidentified comparable form
- †Litocherus
  - †Litocherus zygeus
- †Lophiparamys
  - †Lophiparamys murinus – or unidentified comparable form
- Lygodium
  - †Lygodium kaulfussi

== M ==
- Marchantia
  - †Marchantia pealei
  - †Marchantia pealii
- †Megalagus
  - †Megalagus brachyodon – or unidentified comparable form
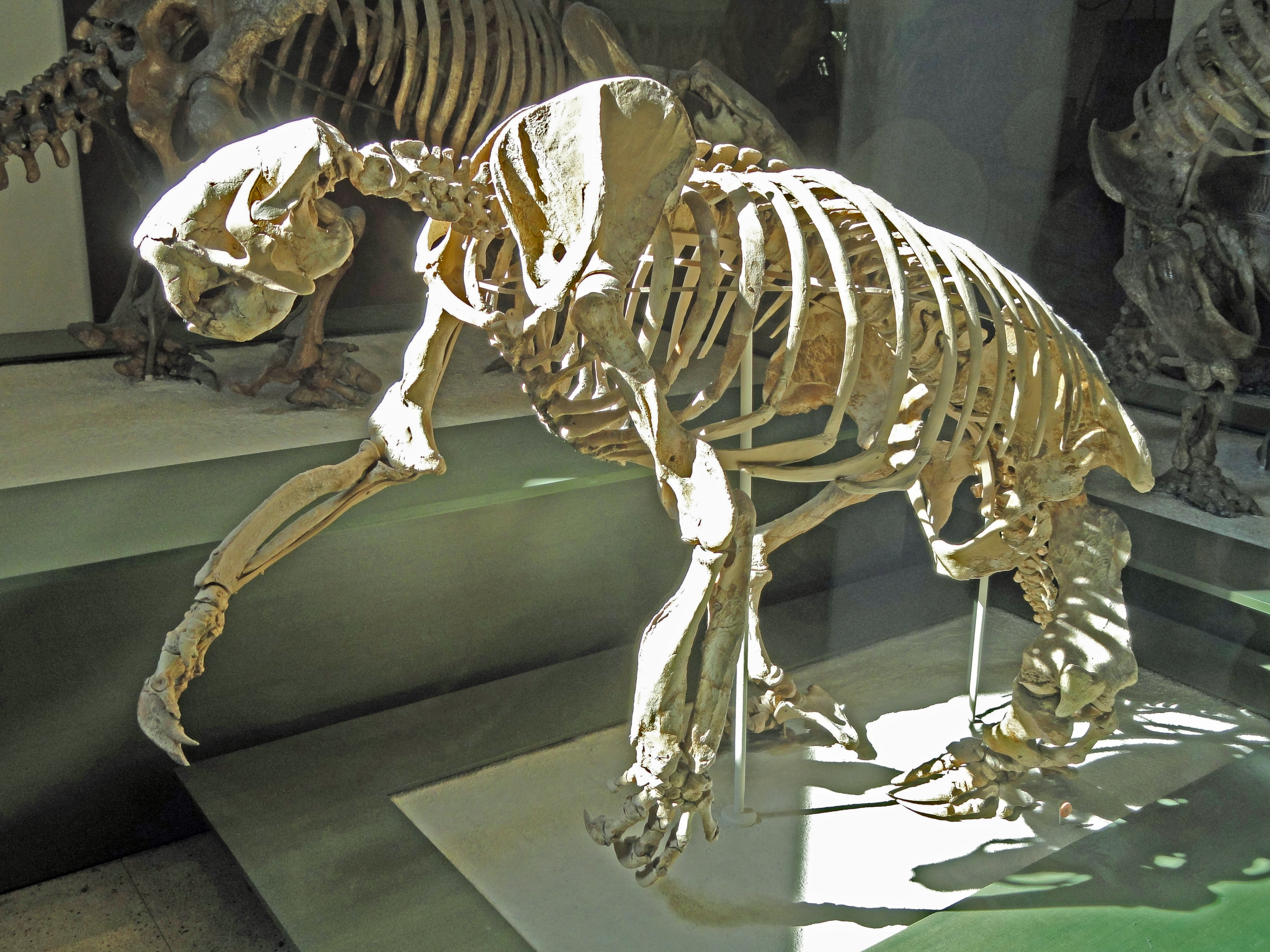
- Mounted fossilized skeleton of the Miocene-Pleistocene ground sloth Megalonyx
  †Megalonyx
  - †Megalonyx jeffersonii
- †Meliosma
  - †Meliosma longifolia
- †Meliosoma
  - †Meliosoma rostellata
- †Menispermites
  - †Menispermites parvareolatus – type locality for species
- †Merychyus
- †Merycochoerus
- †Merycoidodon
  - †Merycoidodon bullatus
  - †Merycoidodon culbertsoni
  - †Merycoidodon major
- †Mesodma
  - †Mesodma pygmaea
- †Mesohippus
  - †Mesohippus bairdi
  - †Mesohippus propinquus – or unidentified comparable form
  - †Mesohippus westoni – or unidentified comparable form
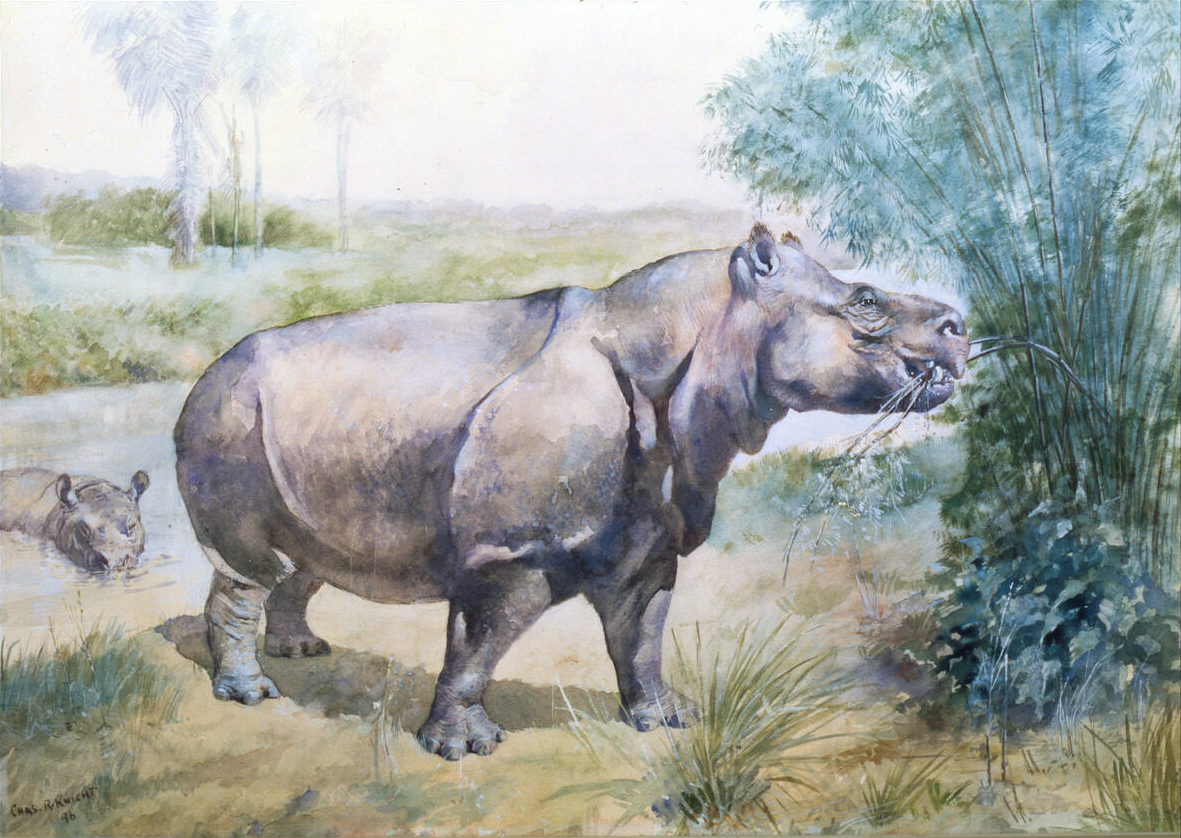
- Restoration of the Eocene-Miocene swamp rhinoceros Metamynodon. Charles R. Knight (1896).
  †Metamynodon
- †Metaparamys
  - †Metaparamys dawsonae – or unidentified comparable form
- Metasequoia
  - †Metasequoia occidentalis
- †Miacis
- †Microcosmodon
- †Microparamys – or unidentified comparable form
- †Micropternodus
  - †Micropternodus borealis – or unidentified comparable form
- †Microsyops
  - †Microsyops angustidens
- †Mimetodon
  - †Mimetodon silberlingi
- †Miniochoerus
  - †Miniochoerus starkensis – type locality for species
- †Miohippus
  - †Miohippus obliquidens
- †Musophyllum
  - †Musophyllum complicatum

== N ==
- †Nannodectes
- †Nanotragulus
- †Nelumbago
  - †Nelumbago montanum
- †Nelumbium
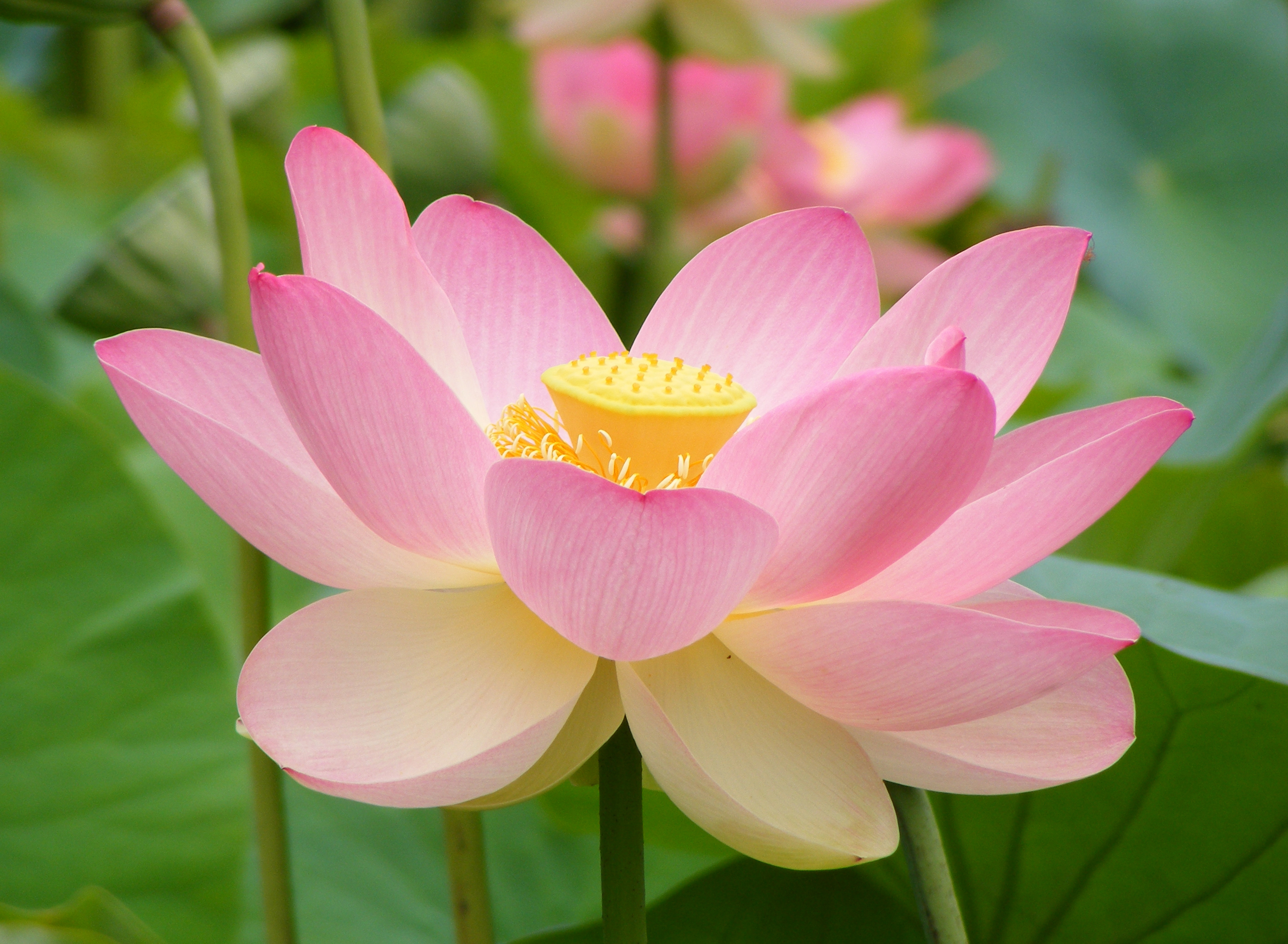
- A living Nelumbo lotus
  †Nelumbo
  - †Nelumbo aureavallis – type locality for species
  - †Nelumbo FU062 informal
  - †Nelumbo FU085 informal
  - †Nelumbo FU62 informal
- †Neoplagiaulax
  - †Neoplagiaulax hunteri
  - †Neoplagiaulax mckennai
  - †Neoplagiaulax nanophus
- †Nephrops
  - †Nephrops buntingi – type locality for species
- †Nordenskioldia
  - †Nordenskioldia borealis
- †Notomorpha
  - †Notomorpha garmanii
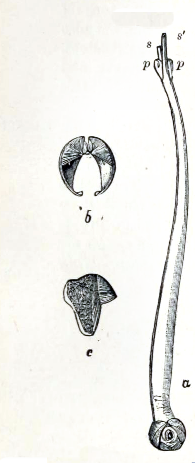
- Anatomy of a de-shelled Nototeredo shipworm
  †Nototeredo
  - †Nototeredo globosa
- †Nyssa
  - †Nyssa alata
- †Nyssidium
  - †Nyssidium arcticum
  - †Nyssidium articum

== O ==
- †Ogmophis
  - †Ogmophis compactus
- †Oligoryctes
  - †Oligoryctes altitalonidus
  - †Oligoryctes cameronensis – or unidentified comparable form
- †Oligoscalops
  - †Oligoscalops galbreathi
- †Oligotheriomys
  - †Oligotheriomys magnus
  - †Oligotheriomys primus – type locality for species
- †Onoclea
  - †Onoclea hesperia
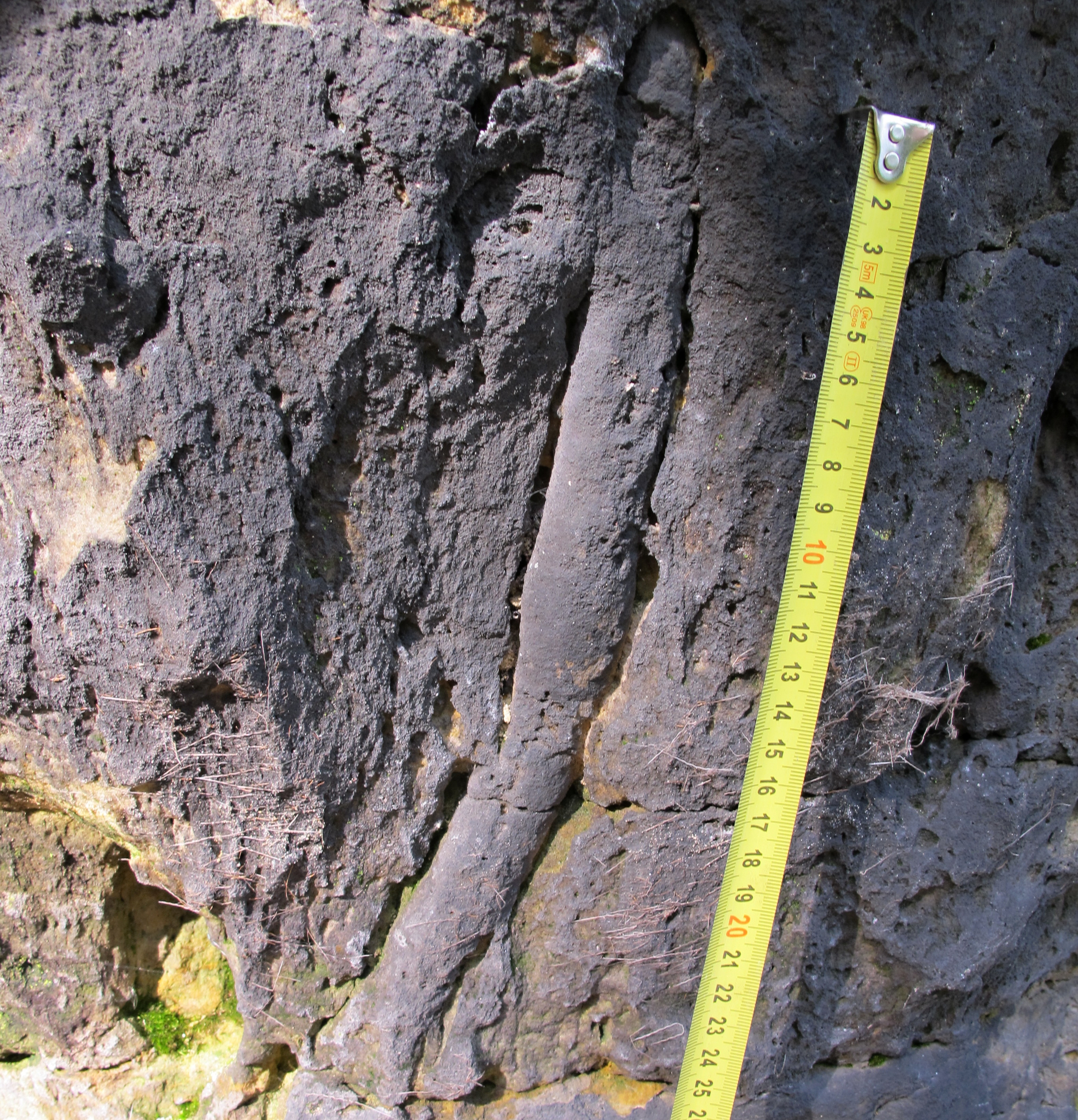
- Fossil of the Permian-modern crustacean burrow ichnogenus Ophiomorpha
  †Ophiomorpha
  - †Ophiomorpha nodosa
- †Oreithyia
  - †Oreithyia oaklandi
- †Osbornodon
  - †Osbornodon renjiei – type locality for species
- †Osmunda
  - †Osmunda macrophylla
- †Oxyacodon
  - †Oxyacodon priscilla

== P ==
- †Palaeanodon – tentative report
- †Palaeocarpinus
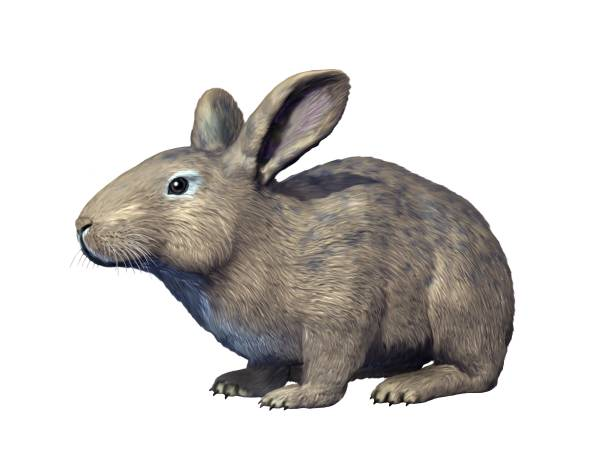
- Restoration of the Oligocene rabbit relative Palaeolagus
  †Palaeolagus
  - †Palaeolagus haydeni
  - †Palaeolagus temnodon – or unidentified comparable form
- †Palaeophytocrene
- †Palaeopsammia
  - †Palaeopsammia zitteli – type locality for species
- †Palaeoryctes
  - †Palaeoryctes punctatus – or unidentified comparable form
- †Palaeosinopa
- †Palaeoxantusia – report made of unidentified related form or using admittedly obsolete nomenclature
  - †Palaeoxantusia borealis
- †Paleotomus
  - †Paleotomus senior – or unidentified comparable form
- †Palmacites
- †Paradjidaumo
  - †Paradjidaumo hansonorum – or unidentified comparable form
  - †Paradjidaumo trilophus
- †Paramys
  - †Paramys excavatus – or unidentified comparable form
- †Paranymphaea
  - †Paranymphaea crassifolia
- †Pararyctes
  - †Pararyctes pattersoni
- †Parataxodium – or unidentified comparable form
- †Paraternstroemia – type locality for genus
  - †Paraternstroemia hyphovenosa – type locality for species
- †Parectypodus
  - †Parectypodus lunatus
- †Peltosaurus – or unidentified comparable form
- †Penosphyllum
  - †Penosphyllum cordatum
- †Peradectes
  - †Peradectes elegans
- †Persites – type locality for genus
  - †Persites argutus – type locality for species
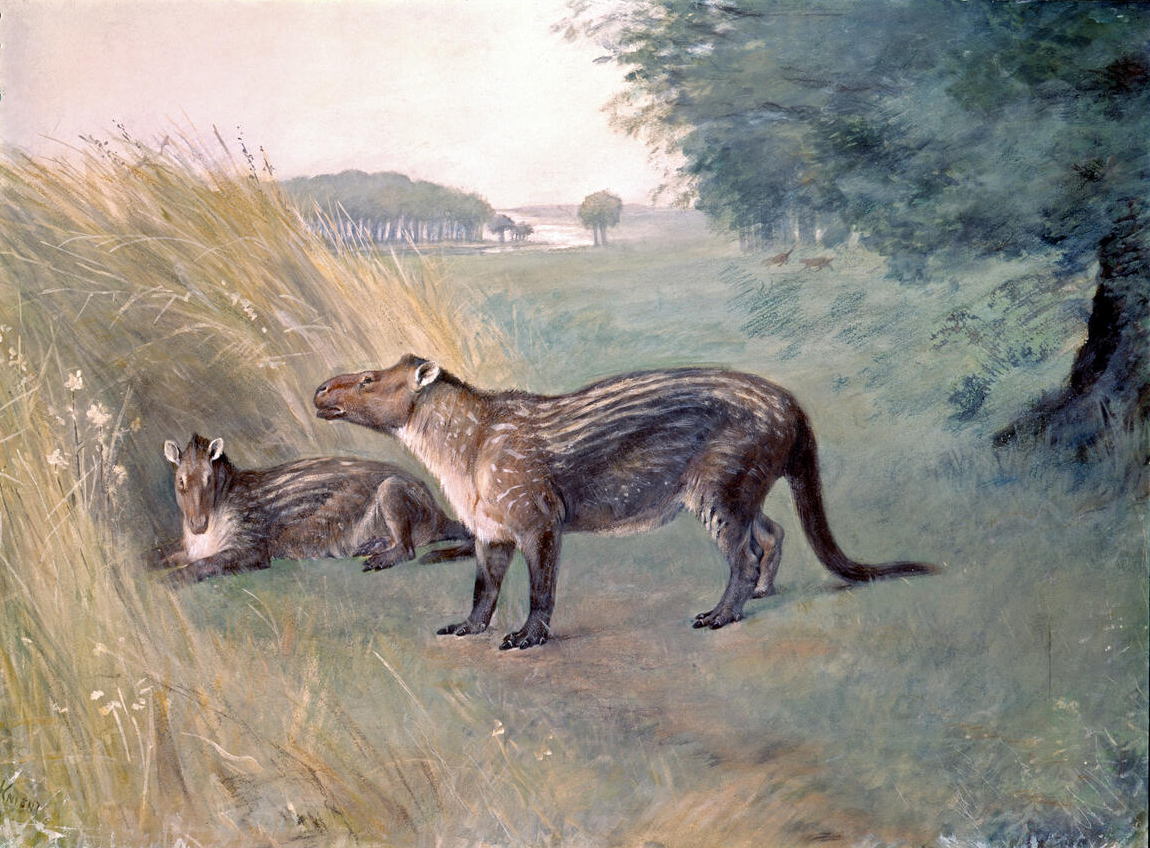
- Life restoration of the Paleocene-Eocene ungulate Phenacodus. Charles R. Knight (1898).
  †Phenacodus
  - †Phenacodus grangeri
  - †Phenacodus magnus
- †Phyllites
  - †Phyllites demoresi
  - †Phyllites disturbans
- †Piceoerpeton
  - †Piceoerpeton willwoodense
- Pinus
  - †Pinus peregrinus – type locality for species
- †Pipestoneomys
- †Planatus
  - †Planatus raynoldsi
- †Plastomenus
- Platanus
  - †Platanus nobilis
  - †Platanus raynoldsi
  - †Platanus raynoldsii
- Platycarya
  - †Platycarya americana
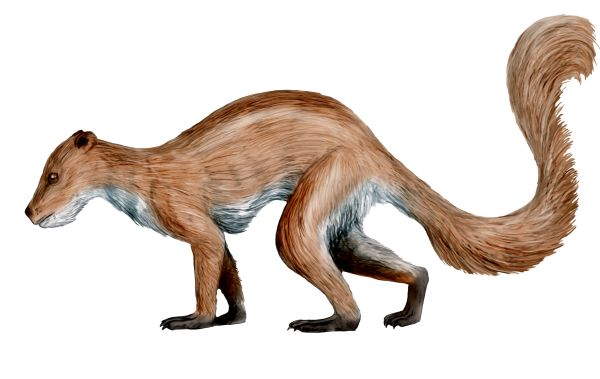
- Life restoration of the Paleocene-Eocene primate Plesiadapis
  †Plesiadapis
  - †Plesiadapis anceps
  - †Plesiadapis churchilli – or unidentified comparable form
  - †Plesiadapis fodinatus – or unidentified comparable form
  - †Plesiadapis rex
- †Poebrotherium
  - †Poebrotherium wilsoni
- Populus
  - †Populus nebrascensis
- †Prochetodon
  - †Prochetodon foxi
- †Prodiacodon
  - †Prodiacodon tauricinerei – or unidentified comparable form
- †Prolapsus
- †Propalaeosinopa
  - †Propalaeosinopa albertensis
- †Prosciurus
  - †Prosciurus albiclivus – type locality for species
  - †Prosciurus hogansoni – type locality for species
  - †Prosciurus vetustus
- †Protictis
  - †Protictis microlestes – or unidentified comparable form
  - †Protictis paralus – type locality for species
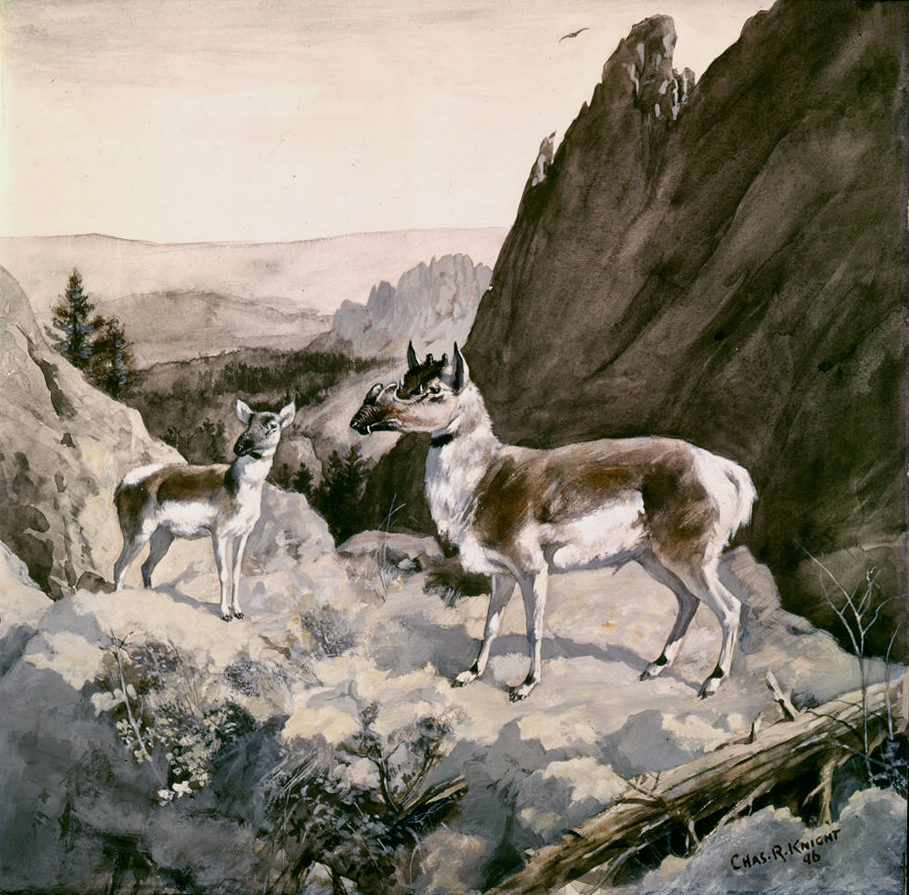
- Life restoration of a female (left) and male of the Oligocene-Miocene even-toed ungulate Protoceras. Charles R. Knight (1896).
  †Protoceras – tentative report
- †Protochelydra
  - †Protochelydra zangerli
- †Protophyllum
  - †Protophyllum semotum – type locality for species
- †Protungulatum
- †Pseudocylindrodon
  - †Pseudocylindrodon silvaticus
- †Psidium – tentative report
- Pterocarya
  - †Pterocarya hispida
- †Pterospermites
  - †Pterospermites cordata
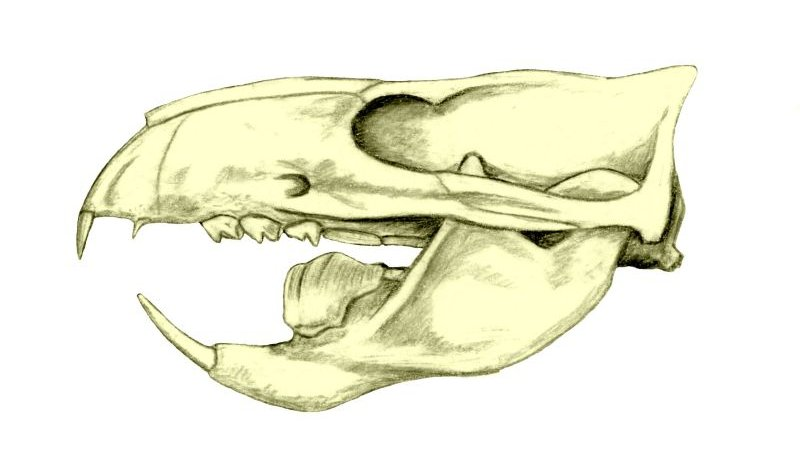
- Illustration of a fossilized skull of the Paleocene multituberculate mammal Ptilodus
  †Ptilodus
  - †Ptilodus kummae
  - †Ptilodus montanus
  - †Ptilodus wyomingensis

== Q ==
- †Queironius – type locality for genus
  - †Queironius praelapsus – type locality for species
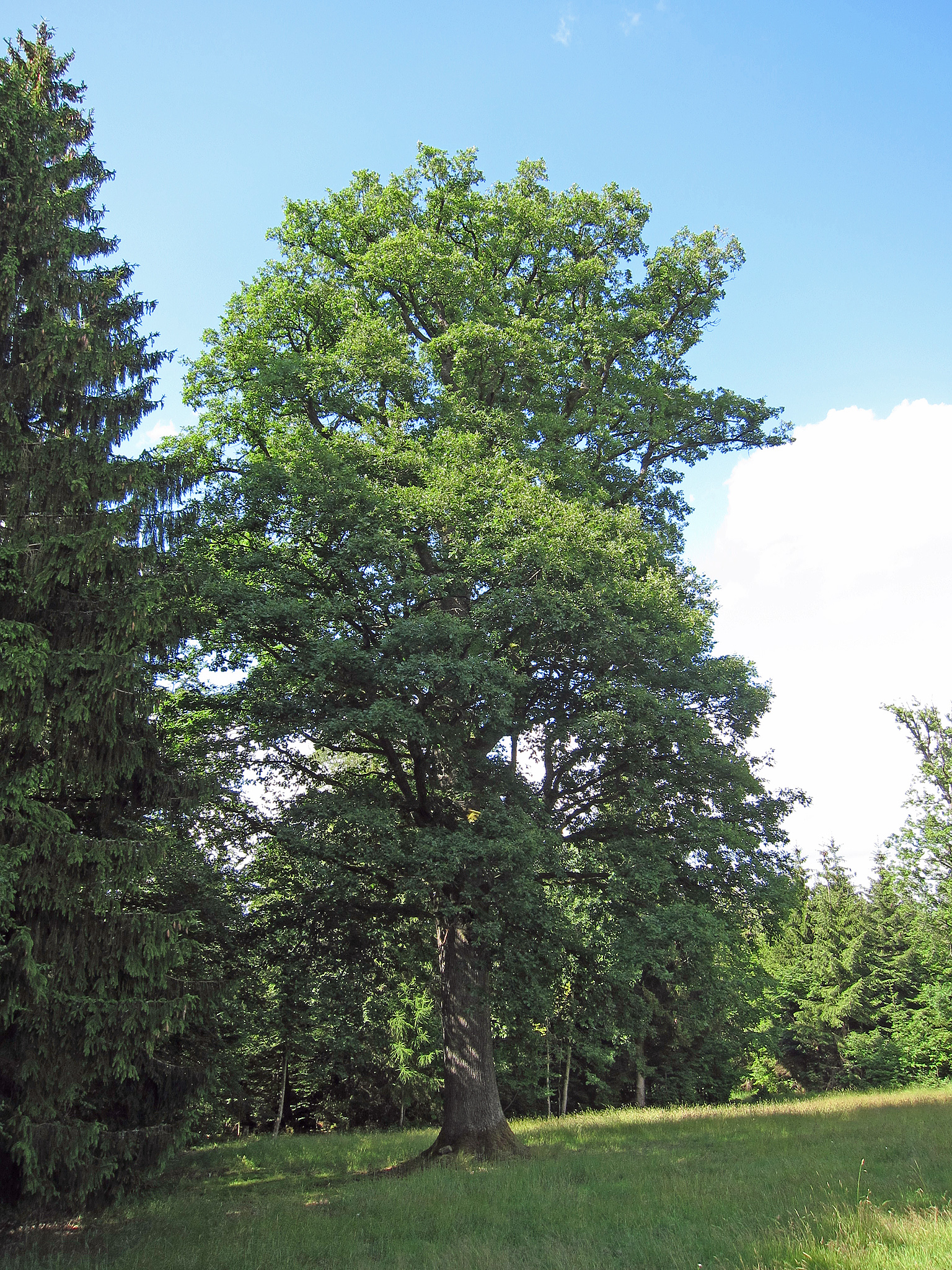
- A living Quercus, or oak tree
  Quercus
  - †Quercus macneili
  - †Quercus sullyi
  - †Quercus yulensis
- †Quereuxia
  - †Quereuxia angulata

== R ==
- †Reithroparamys
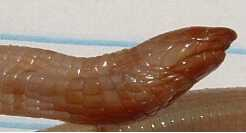
- A living Rhineura floridana, or North American worm lizard
  Rhineura – or unidentified comparable form

== S ==
- Sagittaria
  - †Sagittaria megasperma
- †Salvinia
  - †Salvinia aureovallis – type locality for species
  - †Salvinia preauriculata
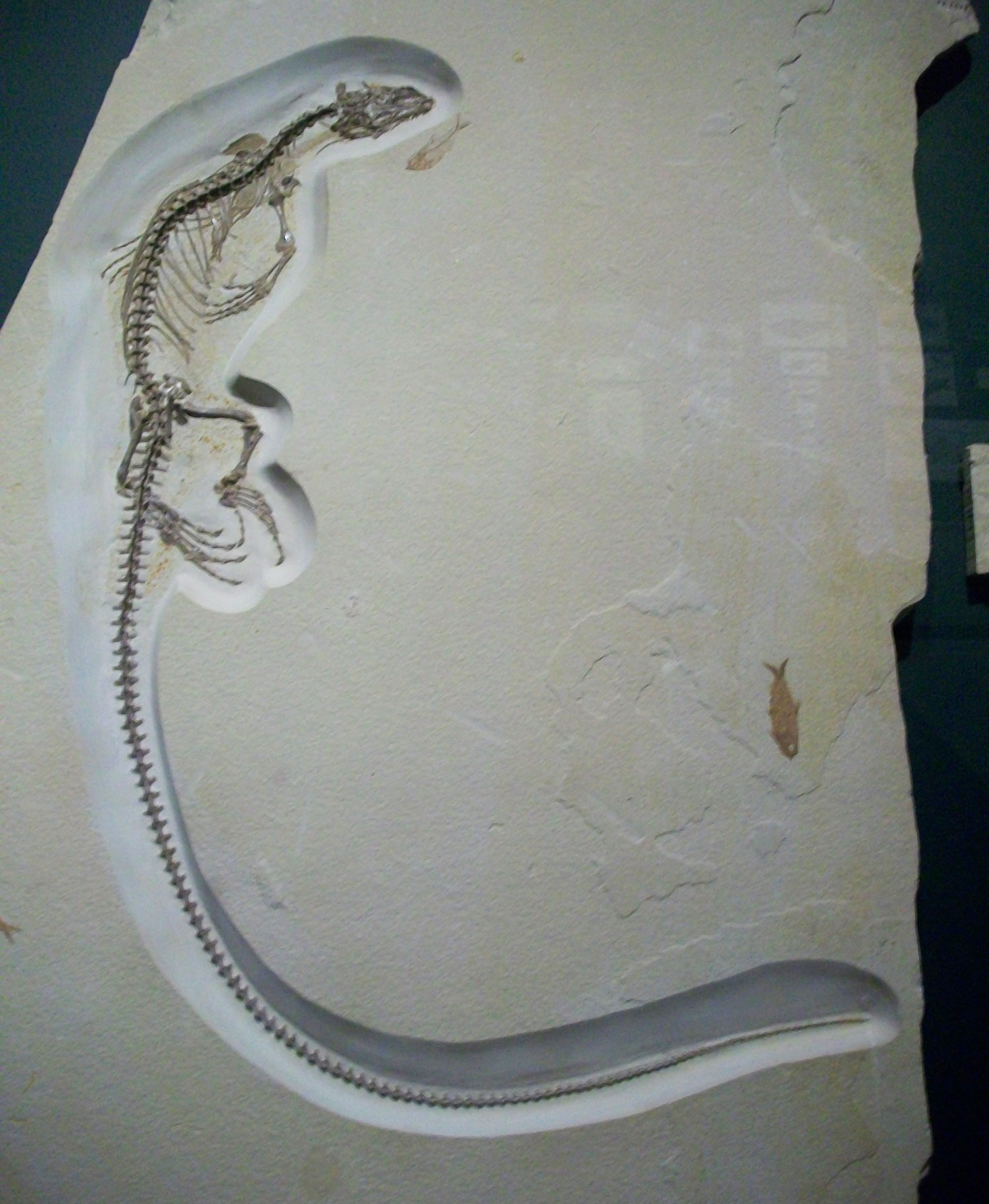
- Fossilized skeleton of the Eocene monitor lizard Saniwa
  †Saniwa
  - †Saniwa edura – type locality for species
  - †Saniwa ensidens – or unidentified comparable form
- †Sauropithecoides – type locality for genus
  - †Sauropithecoides charisticus – type locality for species
- †Scapherpeton
- †Selaginella
  - †Selaginella collieri
- †Simoedosaurus
  - †Simoedosaurus dakotensis – type locality for species
- †Sinclairella
- †Sparganium
  - †Sparganium antiquum
  - †Sparganium parvum – type locality for species
  - †Sparganium stygium
- †Spathorhynchus – or unidentified comparable form
- †Stibarus
  - †Stibarus montanus
- †Stillingia
  - †Stillingia casca – type locality for species
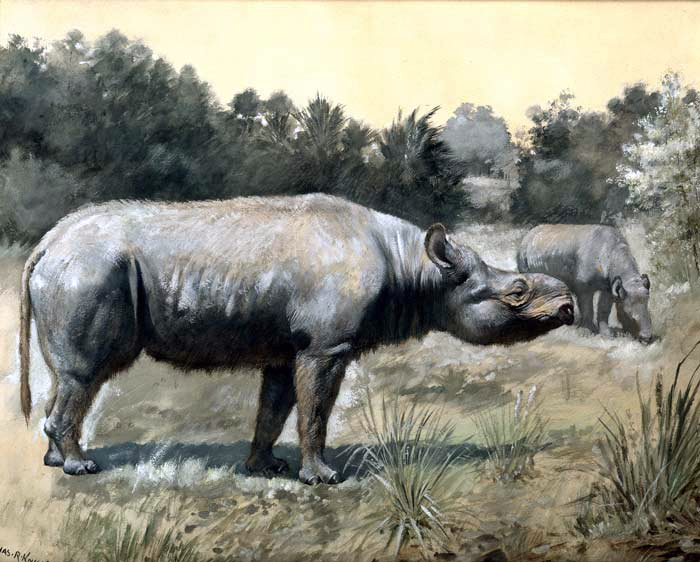
- Life restoration of the Eocene-Oligocene cow-sized rhinoceros Subhyracodon. Charles R. Knight (1890s).
  †Subhyracodon
  - †Subhyracodon occidentalis

== T ==
- Taxodium
  - †Taxodium olrikii
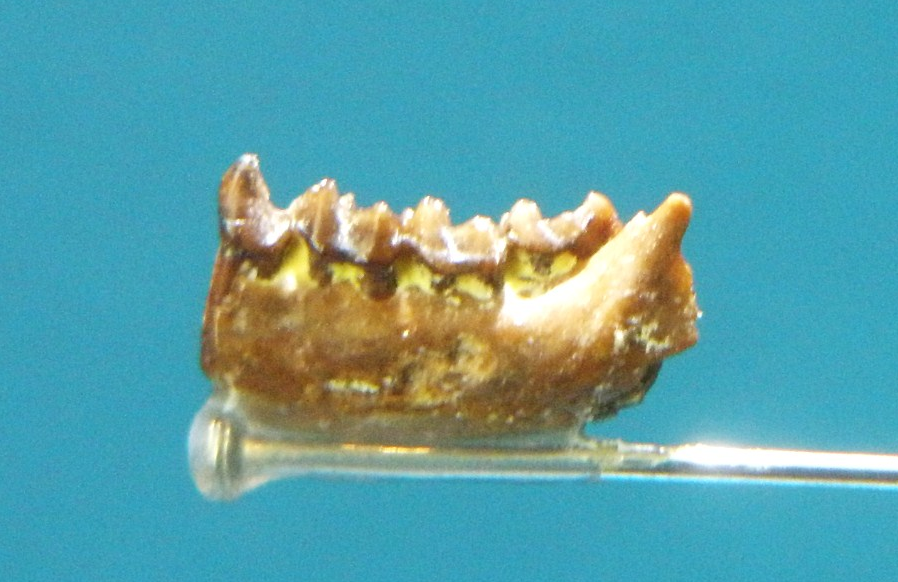
- Fossilized mandible of the Eocene primate Teilhardina
  †Teilhardina
- †Ternstroemites
  - †Ternstroemites aureavallis – type locality for species
- †Tetonoides
  - †Tetonoides pearcei
- Thamnophis
- †Thryptacodon
  - †Thryptacodon australis
- †Thuites
  - †Thuites interruptus
- †Thuja
  - †Thuja interrupta
- Tinosaurus
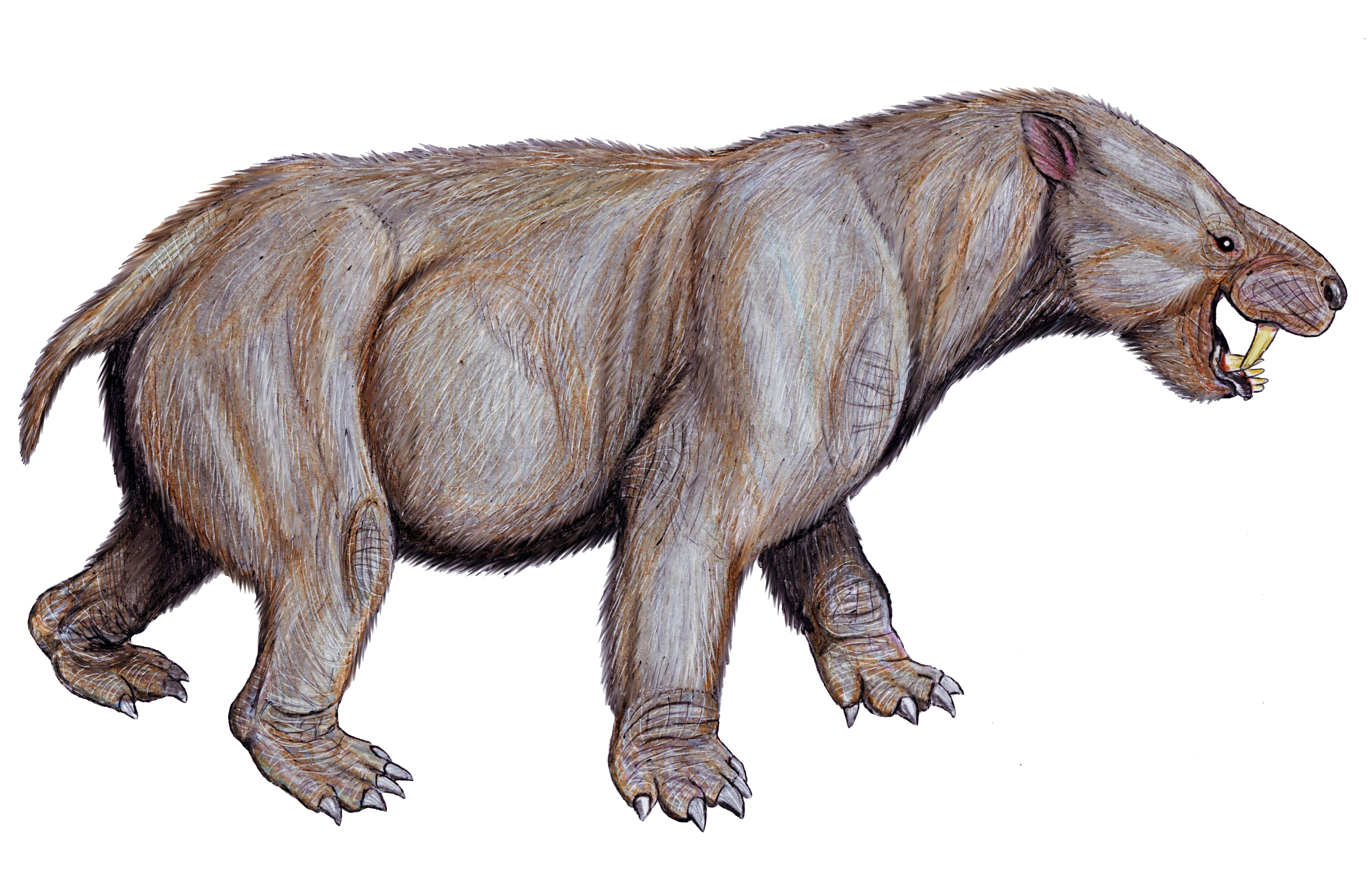
- Life restoration of the Paleocene pantodont mammal Titanoides
  †Titanoides
  - †Titanoides primaevus – type locality for species
- †Toxotherium
- †Trapa
  - †Trapa angulata
- †Trichopterodomus – type locality for genus
  - †Trichopterodomus leonardi – type locality for species
- †Trigonias
- Trochocyathus
  - †Trochocyathus mitratus – type locality for species
- †Trochodendroides
  - †Trochodendroides serrulata
- †Tuberculacerta – type locality for genus
  - †Tuberculacerta pearsoni – type locality for species

== U ==
- †Unuchinia
  - †Unuchinia dysmathes

== V ==
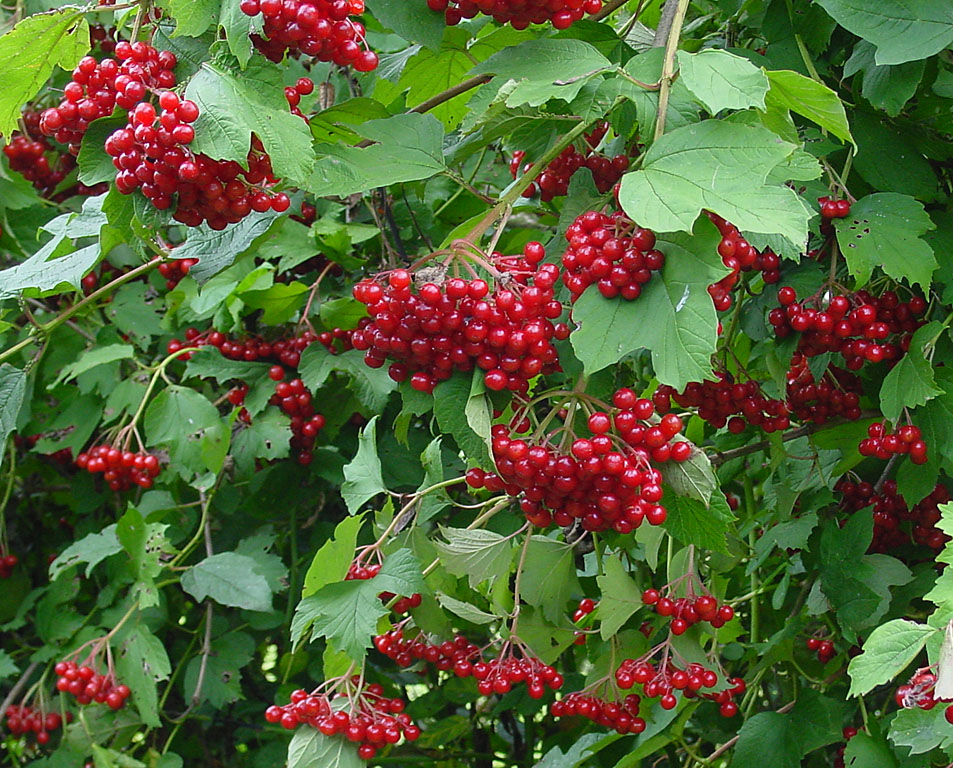
- Leaves and fruit of a living Viburnum.
  †Viburnum
  - †Viburnum antiquum
  - †Viburnum tilioides

== W ==
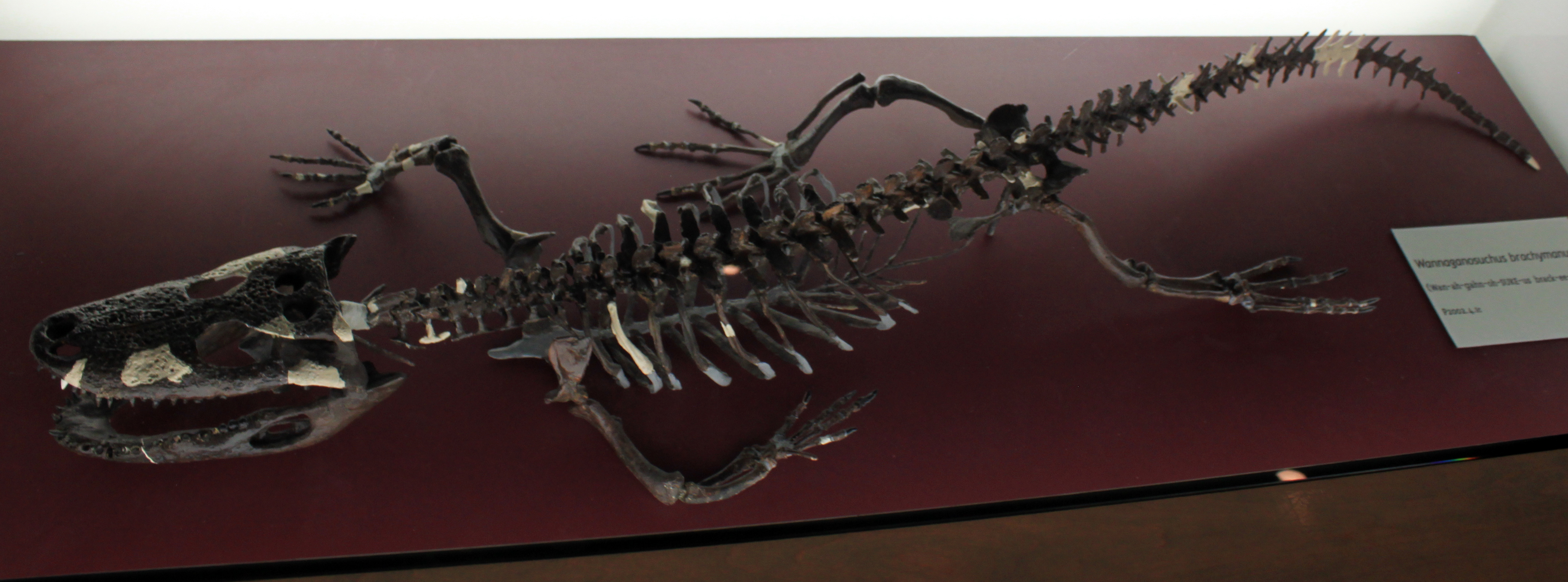
- Mounted fossilized skeleton of the Paleocene Alligator relative Wannaganosuchus
  †Wannaganosuchus – type locality for genus
  - †Wannaganosuchus brachymanus – type locality for species
- †Wardiaphyllum
  - †Wardiaphyllum daturaefolium
- †Willeumys
  - †Willeumys viduus
- †Woodwardia
  - †Woodwardia arctica
  - †Woodwardia gravida – type locality for species

== X ==
- †Xestops – or unidentified comparable form

== Y ==
- †Yoderimys
  - †Yoderimys stewarti – or unidentified comparable form

== Z ==
- †Zingiberopsis – type locality for genus
  - †Zingiberopsis isonervosa – type locality for species
