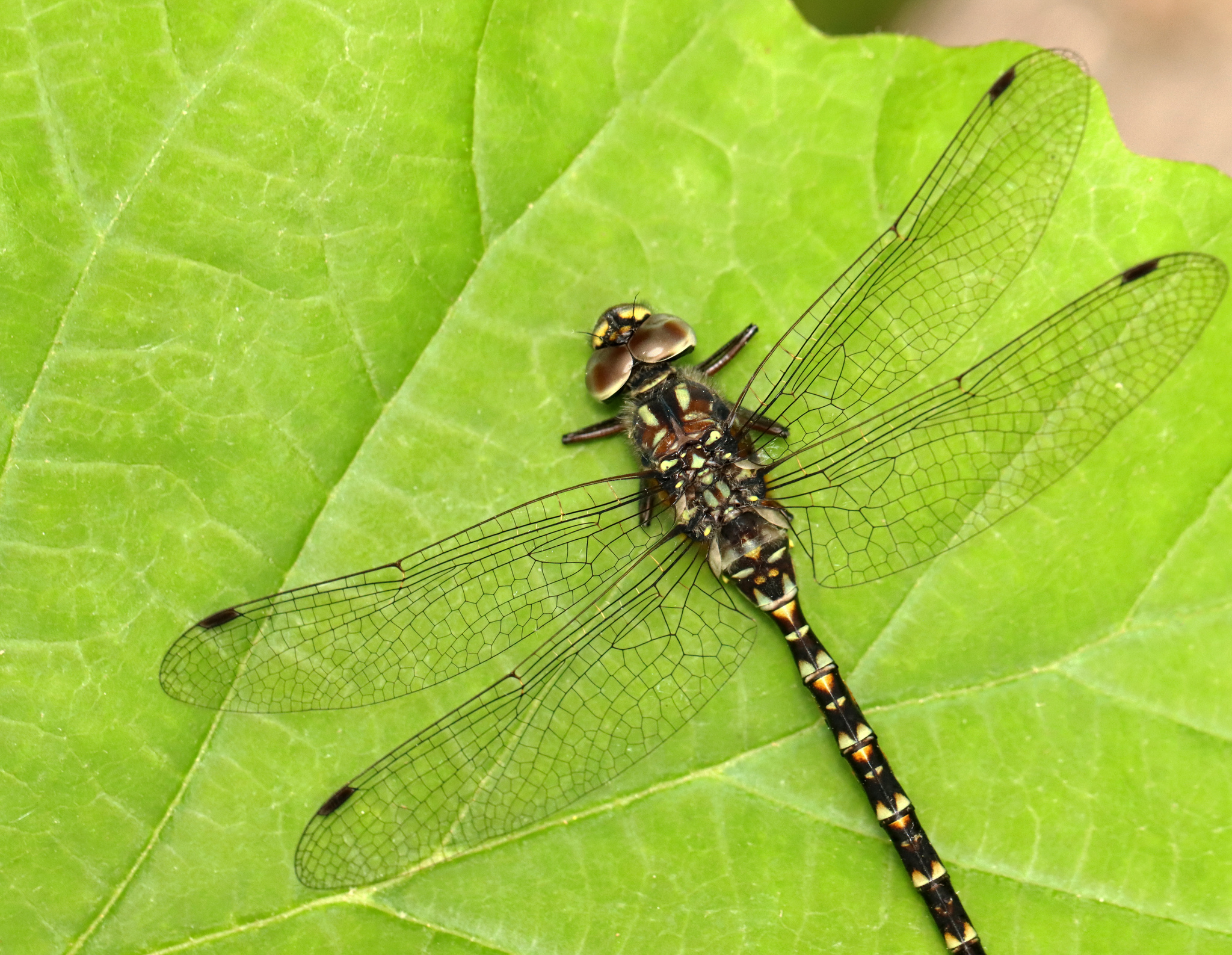
- G. furcillata in Dutchess County, New York

Scientific classification
- Kingdom: Animalia
- Phylum: Arthropoda
- Clade: Pancrustacea
- Class: Insecta
- Order: Odonata
- Infraorder: Anisoptera
- Family: Aeshnidae
- Genus: Gomphaeschna
- Species: G. furcillata

Binomial name
- Gomphaeschna furcillata Say 1839

= Gomphaeschna furcillata =

Species of dragonfly

Gomphaeschna furcillata is a dragonfly in the genus Gomphaeschna ("pygmy darners"), in the family Aeshnidae ("darner dragonflies"). A common name for Gomphaeschna furcillata is "harlequin darner". Gomphaeschna furcillata is found in North America. It is native to Canada and the continental United States.

The IUCN conservation status of Gomphaeschna furcillata is "least concern", with no immediate threat to the species' survival. The population is stable.
