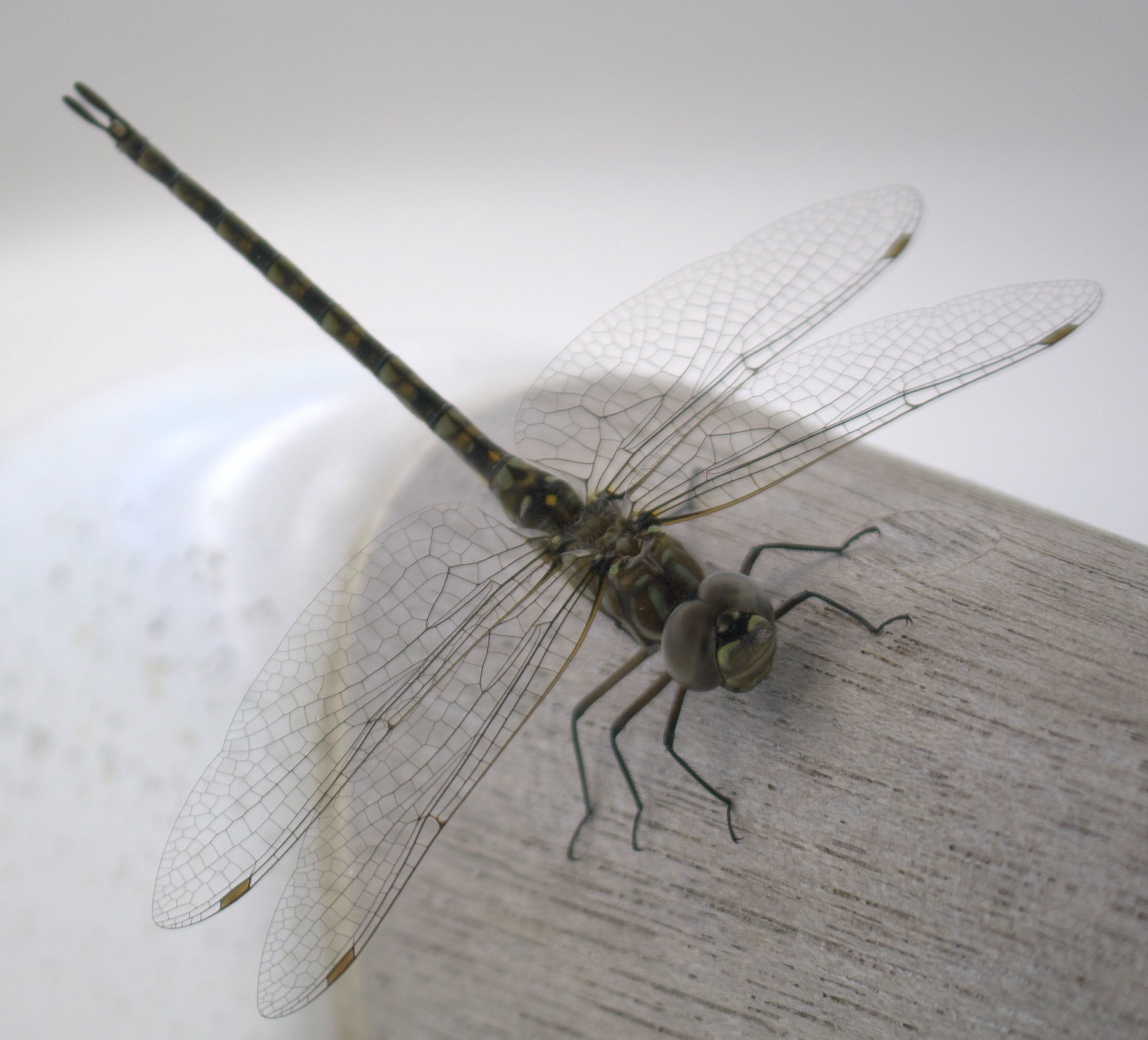

Conservation status
- Least Concern (IUCN 3.1)

Scientific classification
- Kingdom: Animalia
- Phylum: Arthropoda
- Class: Insecta
- Order: Odonata
- Infraorder: Anisoptera
- Family: Aeshnidae
- Genus: Gomphaeschna
- Species: G. antilope

Binomial name
- Gomphaeschna antilope (Hagen, 1874)

= Gomphaeschna antilope =

Species of dragonfly

Gomphaeschna antilope, the taper-tailed darner, is a species of darner in the dragonfly family Aeshnidae. It is found in East America.

The IUCN conservation status of Gomphaeschna antilope is "LC", least concern, with no immediate threat to the species' survival. The population is stable. The IUCN status was reviewed in 2017.
