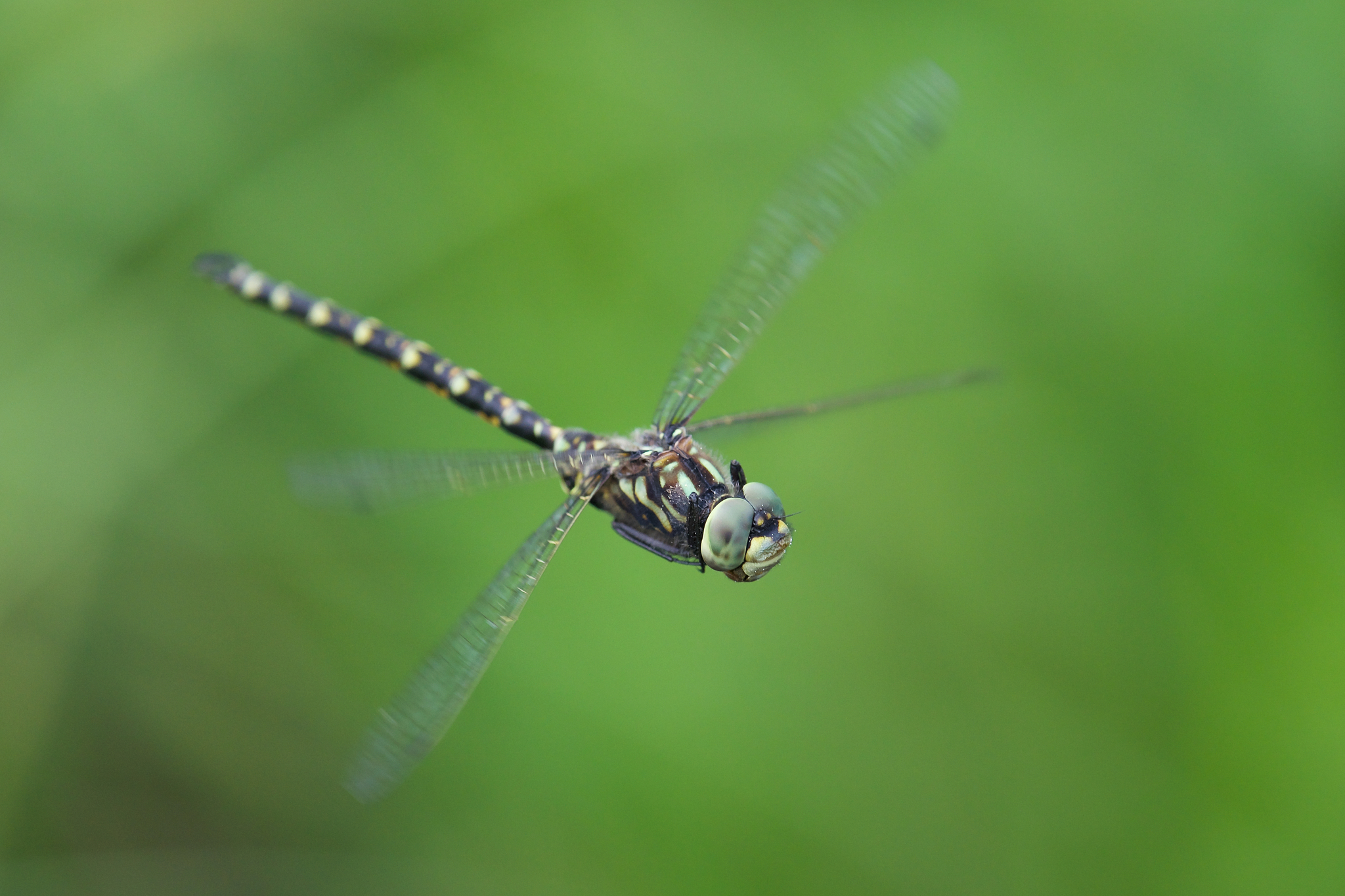
- Gomphaeschna furcillata

Scientific classification
- Kingdom: Animalia
- Phylum: Arthropoda
- Class: Insecta
- Order: Odonata
- Infraorder: Anisoptera
- Family: Aeshnidae
- Genus: Gomphaeschna; Selys, 1871

= Gomphaeschna =

Gomphaeschna Temporal range: Early Cretaceous (Berriasian) to present

Genus of dragonflies

Gomphaeschna is a genus of pygmy darners in the dragonfly family Aeshnidae. There are two extant species in Gomphaeschna, both native to eastern North America. In addition, multiple fossil species are known from Eurasia and western North America. Some authorities treat it as belonging to its own family, Gomphaeschnidae, due to its ancient origins.

This is one of the most ancient known extant dragonfly genera, with the species G. inferna known from the earliest Cretaceous (Berriasian) of Russia, making it one of the earliest crown group aeshnids. They appear to have persisted in Europe up to the mid-Miocene, but in modern times are restricted to eastern North America.

== Species ==
These two species belong to the genus Gomphaeschna:

- Gomphaeschna antilope (Hagen, 1874) (taper-tailed darner)
- Gomphaeschna furcillata (Say, 1840) (harlequin darner)

In addition, the following fossil species are known:

- †Gomphaeschna carinthiae Schädel & Lechner, 2017 (middle Miocene of Austria)
- †?Gomphaeschna danica Madsen & Nel, 1997 (late Paleocene/early Eocene of Denmark)
- †Gomphaeschna inferna Pritykina, 1977 (earliest Cretaceous of Buryatia, Russia)
- †Gomphaeschna miocenica Prokop & Nel, 2002 (early Miocene of the Czech Republic)
- †Gomphaeschna paleocenica Madsen & Nel, 1997 (late Paleocene/early Eocene of Denmark)
- †Gomphaeschna schrankii Lewis, 1988 (mid-late Paleocene of North Dakota, US)
- †Gomphaeschna sibirica Bechly et al., 2001 (Barremian to Aptian of Zabaykalsky Krai, Russia and Mongolia)
