= Robert Bruce Horsfall =

American painter

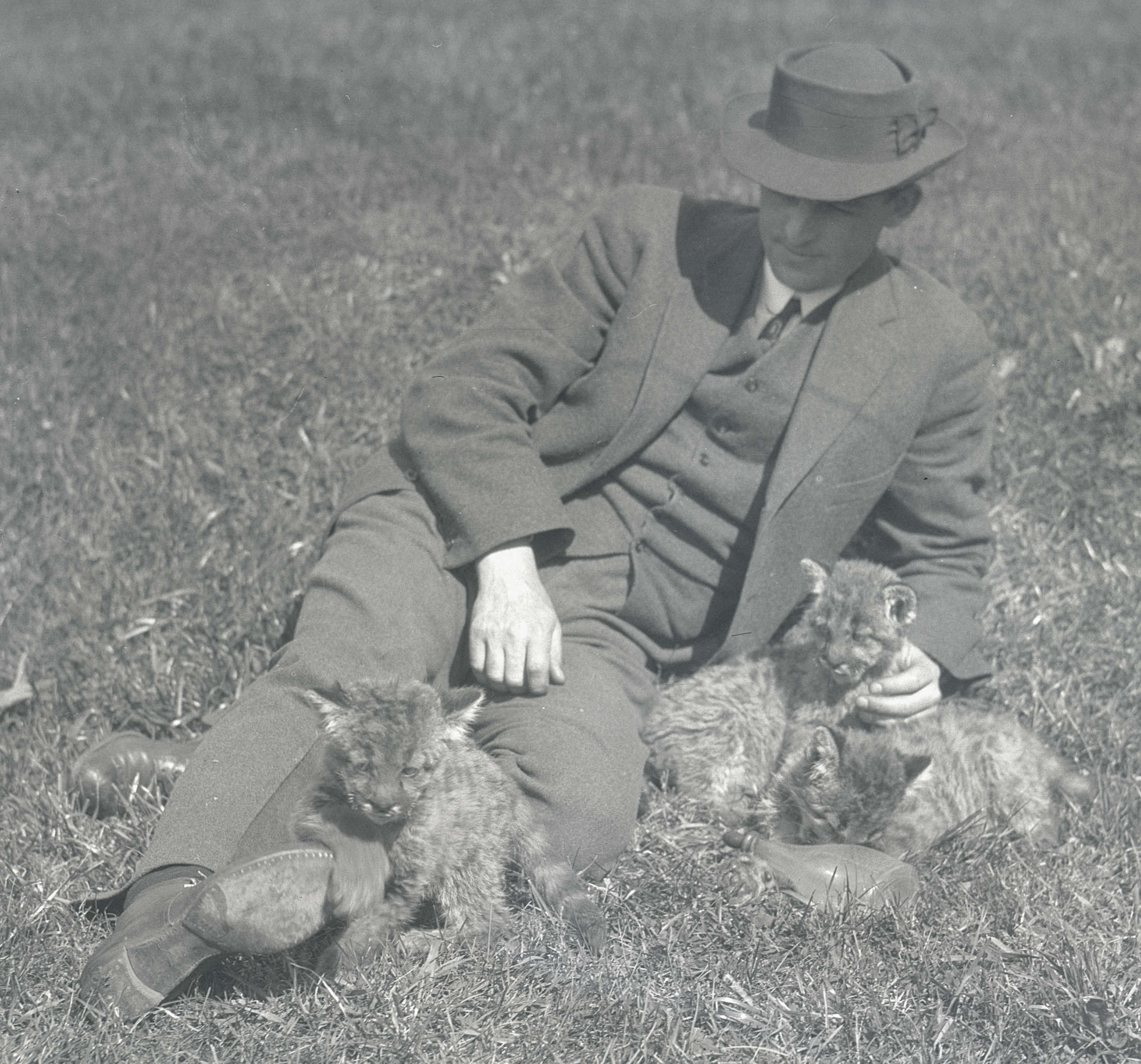
- Horsfall with cougar cubs
- Born: October 21, 1869; Clinton, Iowa
- Died: March 24, 1948 (aged 78); Long Branch, New Jersey
- Occupation: Wildlife illustrator
- Spouse: Carra Hunting
- Children: 2

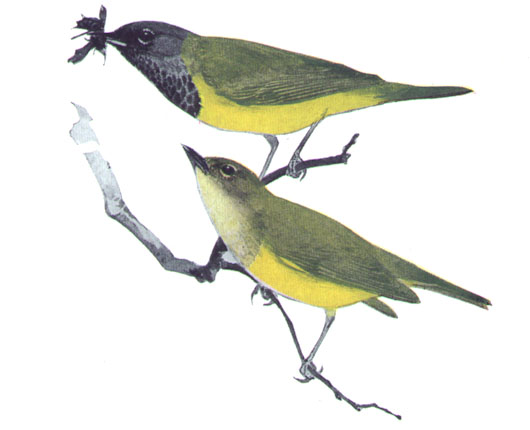
MacGillivray's warbler from Warblers of North America (1907)

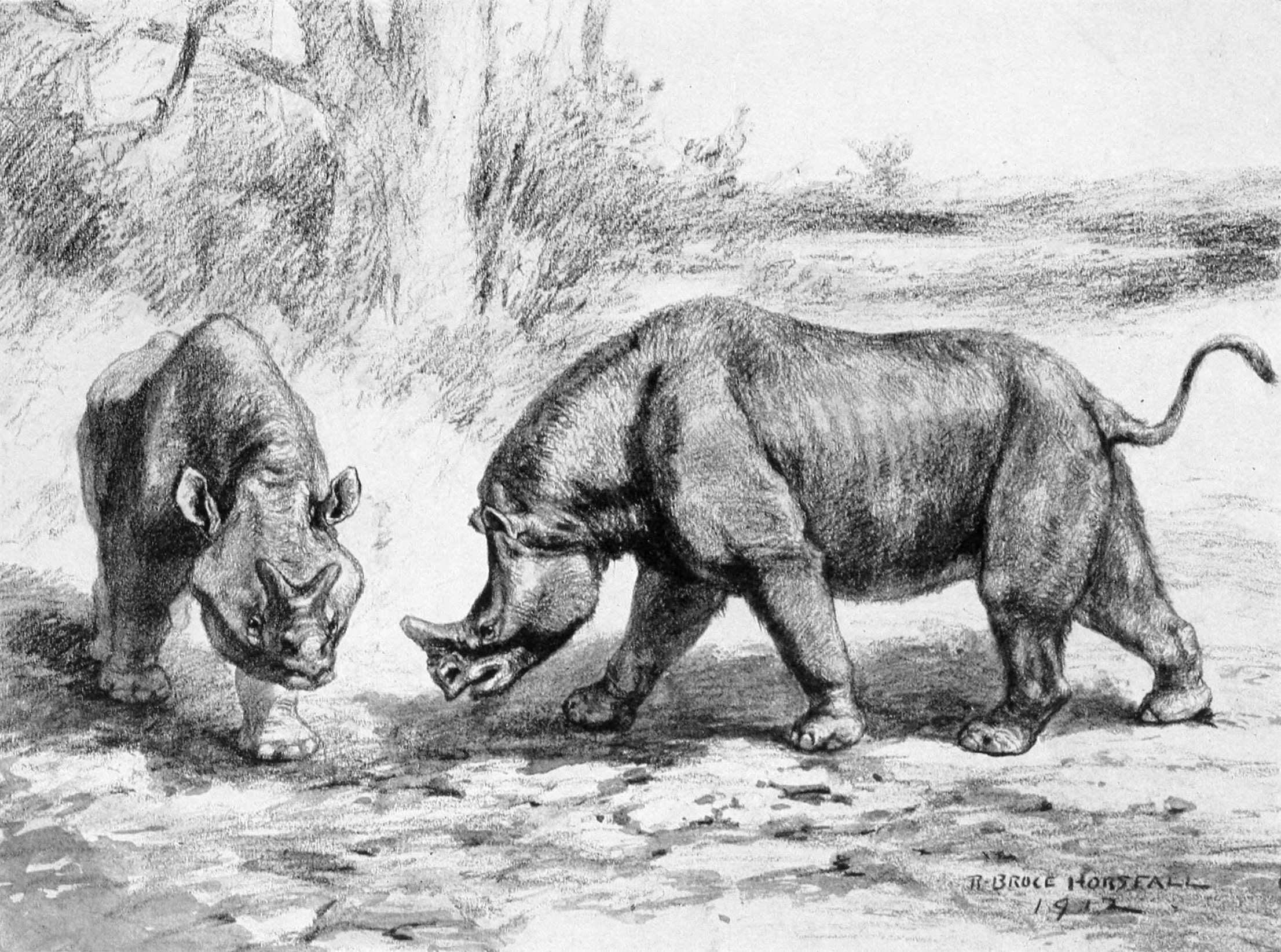
Restoration of Megacerops, 1912

Robert Bruce Horsfall (October 21, 1869 – March 24, 1948) was an American wildlife illustrator. His paintings were included in several works from the early 20th century, including Frank M. Chapman's Warblers of North America.

== Biography ==
Horsfall was born in Clinton, Iowa, in 1869 to John Tomlin and Anne Buttersby Horsfall. He studied at the Cincinnati Art Academy and later at art schools in Munich and Paris. From 1904 to 1914, he did scientific illustrations for the Princeton Patagonian Report, and lived at Princeton University for most of that time. He married Carra Elisabeth Hunting in 1906 and had two sons (one adopted). The family moved to Oregon in 1914, where Horsfall was an instructor at Reed College. In 1923 he moved to New York, where he worked as an artist for Nature magazine. He died on March 24, 1948, in Long Branch, New Jersey.

== Painting ==
Horsfall enjoyed painting wildlife, and contributed to a number of field guides, scientific publications, and conservationist works. He was a member of the American Ornithologists' Union, the Cooper Ornithological Club, the Northwest Bird and Mammal Society, the American Society of Mammalogists, and the American Museum of Natural History.

Horsfall's paintings were first exhibited in Chicago in 1886, and later at the Chicago World's Fair in 1893. At the time of his death in 1948, there were permanent exhibitions of his work at the Peabody Museum of Natural History at Yale University, the Kent Scientific Museum in Grand Rapids, Michigan, and the Zoological Museum at the University of Minnesota. Two portraits he painted were also hung in Guyot Hall at Princeton University.

In 2023, the Oregon Historical Society showcased 55 of Horsfall's watercolor bird paintings in the exhibition Birds of the Pacific Coast: The Illustrations of R. Bruce Horsfall.

== Publications ==
- American Land Birds by Alice E. Ball; illustrated by Robert Bruce Horsfall. New York : Tudor, 1936.
- Bird and Animal Paintings by R. Bruce Horsfall; text by Carra E. Horsfall. Washington, D.C., Nature magazine, 1930
- Birds of California: an introduction to more than 300 common birds of the state and adjacent islands, with a supplementary list of rare migrants, accidental visitants, and hypothetical subspecies by Irene Grosvenor Wheelock; with 10 full-page plates and 78 drawings in the text by Bruce Horsfall. Chicago : A.C. McClurg, 1904, 1912.
- Birds of North Carolina, by Thomas Gilbert Pearson, Clement Samuel Brimley and Herbert Hutchinson Brimley, illustrations by Rex Brasher, Robert Bruce Horsfall, and Roger Tory Peterson. North Carolina Department of Agriculture, State Museum Division. Raleigh, Bynum Printing Company, 1942.
- Birds of the Pacific Coast, by Willard Ayres Eliot, including a brief account of the distribution and habitat of 118 birds that are more or less common to the Pacific Coast states and British Columbia w/ 56 color plates by R. Bruce Horsfall. New York : G.P. Putnum's Sons, 1923
- Familiar Birds of the Northwest: Covering Birds Commonly Found in Oregon, Washington, Idaho, Northern California, and Western Canada by Harry B. Nehls; with paintings by R. Bruce Horsfall et al.. Portland, Or. : Portland Audubon Society, 1981.
- A Year with the Birds by Alice E. Ball; illustrated by Robert Bruce Horsfall. New York: Gibbs & Van Vleck, 1916, 1917. Each page is a poem by Ball accompanied by an illustration by Horsfall.
- Songs of the Open; words and music by Grace Keir with illustrations by Robert Bruce Horsfall : Carl Fischer, Inc. New York 1927.
