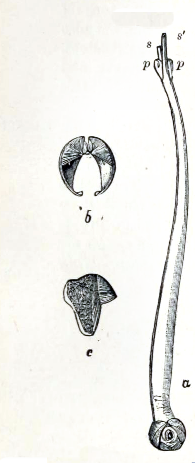
- Nototeredo norvagica a) animal removed from its shelly tube: p,p : pallets; s) exhalant siphon s') inhalant siphon b,c) different aspects of the shell

Scientific classification
- Kingdom: Animalia
- Phylum: Mollusca
- Class: Bivalvia
- Order: Myida
- Superfamily: Pholadoidea
- Family: Teredinidae
- Genus: Nototeredo; Gould, 1870

Species
- See text.

= Nototeredo =

Genus of bivalves

Nototeredo is a genus of ship-worms, marine bivalve molluscs of the family Teredinidae.

== Species in the genus Nototeredo ==
- Nototeredo edax (Hedley, 1895)
- Nototeredo knoxi (Bartsch, 1917) – foliaceous shipworm, knox shipworm
- Nototeredo norvagica (Spengler, 1792) – Norway shipworm
