= Cypressaurus =

Cypressaurus Temporal range: Oligocene

Scientific classification
- Domain: Eukaryota
- Kingdom: Animalia
- Phylum: Chordata
- Class: Reptilia
- Order: Squamata
- Suborder: Iguania
- Family: Iguanidae
- Genus: †Cypressaurus; Holman, 1972

Type species
- †Cypressaurus hypsodontus Holman, 1972

Extinct genus of lizards

Cypressaurus is an extinct genus of iguanid lizard from the Lower Oligocene of Saskatchewan. It was named in 1972 by Holman as Cypressaurus hypsodontus for jaw bones found in the Cypress Hills Formation showing unique tooth anatomy. The anatomy is very similar to the living genus Sceloporus, which Cypressaurus may be an early species of. The tooth row is 11.7 mm (0.46 in) long, with 24 very tall, pleurodont teeth.
