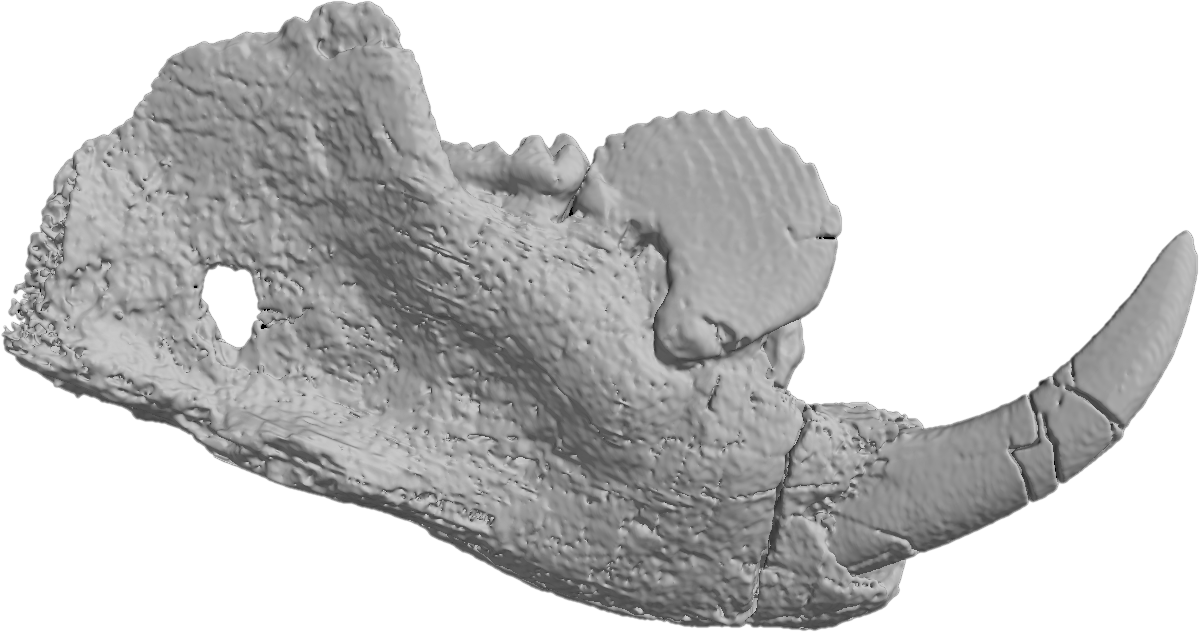
- CT rendering of the holotype jaw

Scientific classification
- Kingdom: Animalia
- Phylum: Chordata
- Class: Mammalia
- Order: †Multituberculata
- Suborder: †Cimolodonta
- Family: †incertae sedis
- Genus: †Koshikibaatar; Sera et al., 2026
- Species: †K. kashimaensis

Binomial name
- †Koshikibaatar kashimaensis Sera et al., 2026

= Koshikibaatar =

Koshikibaatar Temporal range: Late Cretaceous, middle Campanian

Extinct mammal genus

Koshikibaatar (lit. 'Koshiki hero') is an extinct genus of cimolodontan multituberculate mammal known from the Late Cretaceous (Campanian age) Himenoura Group of Japan. The genus contains a single species, Koshikibaatar kashimaensis, known from a partial lower jaw with teeth.

== Discovery and naming ==
The Koshikibaatar fossil material was discovered in outcrops of unit U-III of the Himenoura Group on Shimokoshiki Island (part of the Koshiki Islands) in Kagoshima Prefecture of southwestern Japan. The specimen is housed in the Koshiki Museum, where it is permanently accessioned as specimen KSKM-V00001. The specimen consists of much of the right dentary (lower jaw bone) with four teeth preserved.

In 2026, Takuma Sera and colleagues described Koshikibaatar kashimaensis as a new genus and species of multituberculate based on these fossil remains, establishing KSKM-V00001 as the holotype specimen. The generic name, Koshikibaatar, combines a reference to the Koshiki Islands, from which the holotype is known, with the Mongolian word baatar, meaning 'hero' (a suffix often used in the genus names of Asian multituberculates). The specific name, kashimaensis, references the Kashima area of the island on which the holotype was found.

== Description ==
The K. kashimaensis holotype, KSKM-V00001, comprises most of the right dentary, missing the rear end, including the condyle (articular region for the cranium) and coronoid process. The incisor, third and fourth premolars, and first molar are preserved in the mandible. The second molar is not preserved, but an empty alveolus (tooth socket) is present. The height of the dentary near its midsection (below the first molar) is 9 millimetres (0.35 in).

== Classification ==
To test the affinities and relationships of Koshikibaatar, Sera and colleagues (2026) included it in an updated version of the phylogenetic matrix of Smith et al. (2021). They recovered Koshikibaatar as a member of the more derived multituberculate clade Cimolodonta, as the sister taxon to Cimolodon. The researchers proposed that this close relationship in the analysis may be due to shared characters that are actually plesiomorphic (ancestral) to Cimolodonta, rather than unique to the exclusive group formed by Koshikibaatar and Cimolodon. As such, they regarded the placement of Koshikibaatar within cimolodonts to be uncertain, but considered close affinities with the smaller clade Ptilodontoidea (the group to which Cimolodon belongs) to be possible. Their 50% majority-rule consensus tree (replicated in the cladogram below) yielded more resolved results than the strict consensus tree, the latter of which presented a large, poorly-resolved polytomy.

- Cimolodonta
  - Bryceomys
  - - - Meniscoessus
      - - - Microcosmodon
          - Pentacosmodon
        - - Kogaionidae
          - Taeniolabidoidea
    - - - - Koshikibaatar
          - Cimolodon
        - - Boffius
          - - Neoliotomus
            - - Ectypodus
              - Ptilodus
      - Filikomys
      - Mesodma
      - - Kryptobaatar
        - Nemegtbaatar
        - - Chulsanbaatar
          - Kamptobaatar
        - - Catopsbaatar
          - Buginbaatar
        - - Eucosmodon
          - Stygimys
