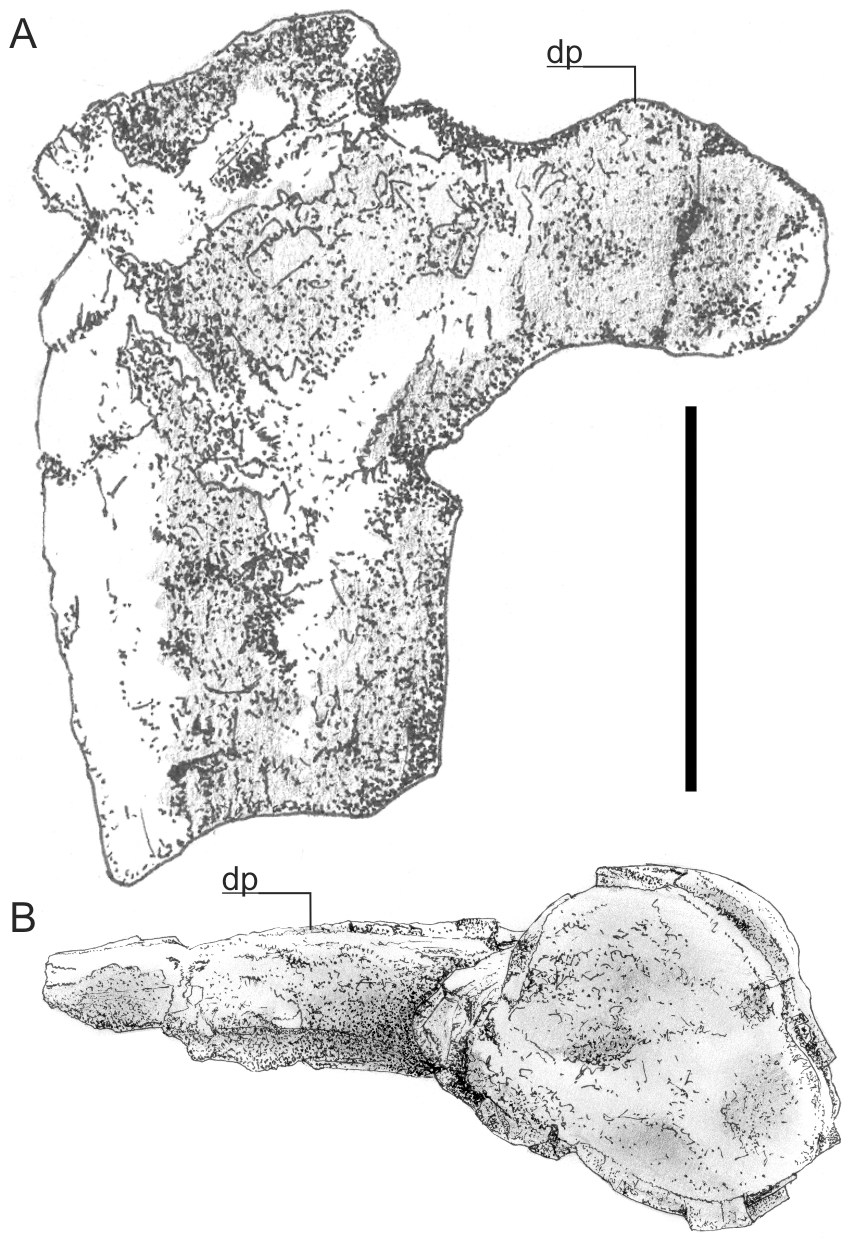
- Left humerus of the holotype specimen in ventral (A) and distal (B) view

Scientific classification
- Kingdom: Animalia
- Phylum: Chordata
- Class: Reptilia
- Order: †Pterosauria
- Suborder: †Pterodactyloidea
- Clade: †Azhdarchoidea
- Family: †Azhdarchidae
- Clade: †Hatzegopterygia
- Genus: †Hatzegopteryx; Buffetaut et al., 2002

Type species
- †Hatzegopteryx thambema Buffetaut et al., 2002

= Hatzegopteryx =

Hatzegopteryx Temporal range: Maastrichtian, 72–66 Ma

Genus of large azhdarchid pterosaur from the Late Cretaceous

Hatzegopteryx ("Hațeg basin wing") is a genus of azhdarchid pterosaur found in the late Maastrichtian deposits of the Densuș-Ciula Formation, an outcropping in Transylvania, Romania. It is known only from the type species, Hatzegopteryx thambema, named by paleontologists Eric Buffetaut, Dan Grigorescu, and Zoltan Csiki in 2002 based on parts of the skull and humerus. Additional specimens, including a neck vertebra, were later placed in the genus, representing a range of sizes. The largest of these remains indicate it was among the biggest pterosaurs, with an estimated wingspan of 10 to 12 m (33 to 39 ft).

Unusually among giant azhdarchids, Hatzegopteryx had a very wide skull bearing large muscular attachments, bones with a spongy internal texture instead of being hollow, and a short, robust, and heavily muscled neck measuring 1.5 m (5 ft) long, which was about half the length of other azhdarchids with comparable wingspans and was capable of withstanding strong bending forces. Hatzegopteryx inhabited Hațeg Island, an island situated in the Cretaceous subtropics within the prehistoric Tethys Sea. In the absence of large theropods, Hatzegopteryx was likely the apex predator of Hațeg Island, tackling proportionally larger prey (including dwarf titanosaurs and iguanodontians) than other azhdarchids.

== Discovery and naming ==
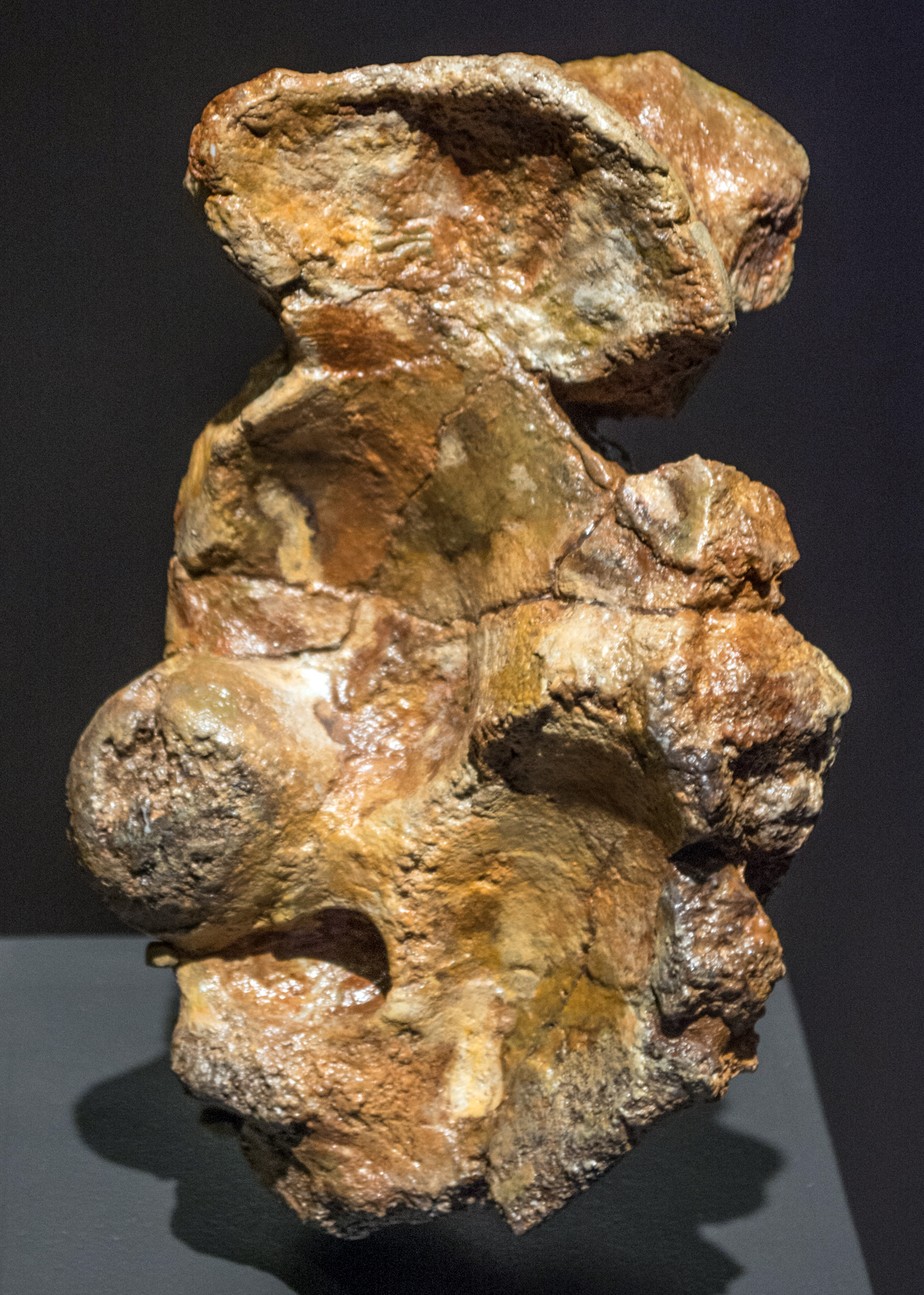
Cast of an assigned wrist bone

The first pterosaur remains from Romania were identified by Franz Nopcsa in 1899, and the first remains of Hatzegopteryx were found during a student dig in the late 1970s from the upper part of the Middle Densuș-Ciula Formation of Vălioara, northwestern Hațeg Basin, Transylvania, western Romania, which has been dated to the late Campanian and early Maastrichtian stages of the Late Cretaceous Period, around 72 million years ago. The holotype of Hatzegopteryx, FGGUB R 1083A, consists of two fragments from the back of the skull and the damaged proximal part of a left humerus. One of these fragments, namely the occipital region, was initially referred to a theropod dinosaur when it was first announced in 1991. A 38.5 cm (15.2 in) long midsection of a femur found nearby, FGGUB R1625, may also belong to Hatzegopteryx. FGGUB R1625 would have belonged to a smaller individual of Hatzegopteryx (assuming it pertains to the genus), with a 5 to 6 m (16 to 20 ft) wingspan. Additional reported specimens from the locality include an unpublished mandible, also from a large individual.

Hatzegopteryx was named in 2002 by French paleontologist Eric Buffetaut and Romanian paleontologists Dan Grigorescu and Zoltan Csiki. The generic name is derived from the Hatzeg (or Hațeg) basin of Transylvania, where the bones were found, and from the Greek word pteryx (πτέρυξ) "wing". The specific name thambema is derived from Greek thambema (θάμβημα) "terror, monster", in reference to its huge size.

New specimens of Hatzegopteryx have since been recovered from other localities. In the Sânpetru Formation from the locality of Vadu, Sântămăria-Orlea, a medium-sized scapulocoracoid was found, which probably pertained to an individual with a wingspan of 4.5 to 5 m (15 to 16 ft). From the Râpa Roșie locality of the Sebeș Formation, which is contemporary and adjacent to the Densuș-Ciula Formation, a single large neck vertebra, the "RR specimen" or EME 215, was found. Although the lack of overlapping elements prevents this specimen from being definitely referred to Hatzegopteryx thambema, its distinctive internal bone structure, as well as the lack of evidence for a second giant azhdarchid in the area, warrant its referral to at least H. sp.

== Description ==
=== Size ===
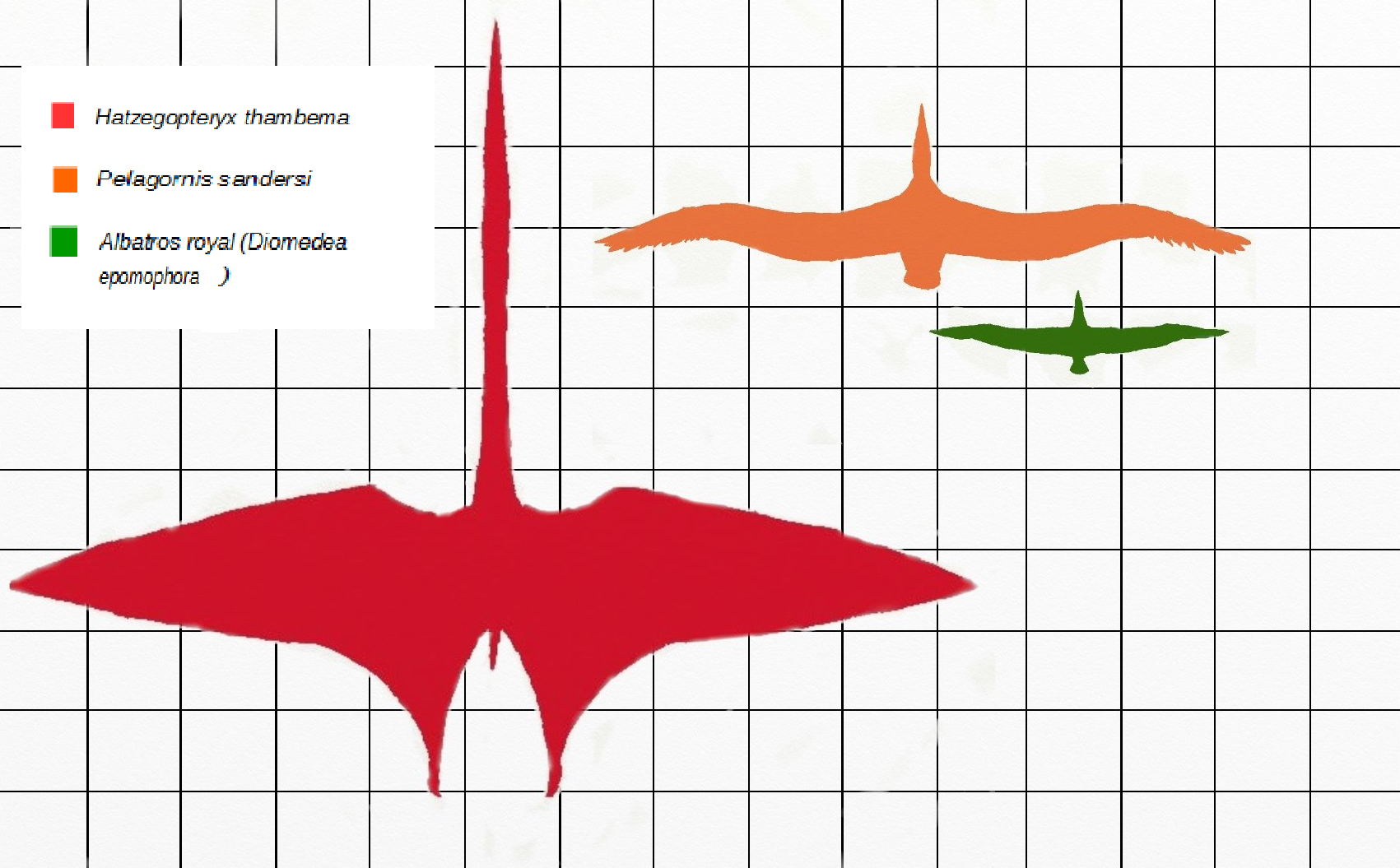
Size comparison of Hatzegopteryx (red) with Pelagornis sandersi (orange) and royal albatross (green)

The size of Hatzegopteryx was initially estimated by comparing the 236 mm (9.3 in) humerus fragment with that of Quetzalcoatlus northropi, which has a 544 mm (21.4 in)-long humerus. Observing that the Hatzegopteryx fragment presented less than half of the original bone, Buffetaut and colleagues established that it could possibly have been "slightly longer" than that of Quetzalcoatlus. The wingspan of the latter had been estimated at 11 to 12 m (36 to 39 ft) in 1981. Earlier estimates had strongly exceeded this at 15 to 20 m (49 to 66 ft). They concluded that an estimate of a 12 m (39 ft) wing span for Hatzegopteryx was conservative, "provided that its humerus was longer than that of Q. northropi". In 2010, Mark Witton and Michael Habib concluded that Hatzegopteryx was probably no larger than Q. northropi in wingspan. The initial conclusions did not account for distortion of the bone. The latter is generally estimated at 10 to 11 m (33 to 36 ft) in length.

It has been suggested (on the basis of the wide and robust neck vertebra referred to Hatzegopteryx) that the entire vertebral column of the animal was similarly expanded, increasing its overall size. However, this is likely not true, since the neck vertebrae of large pterodactyloids generally tend to be wider and larger than the rest of the vertebrae. Although estimates of pterosaur size based on vertebrae alone are not particularly reliable, the size of this vertebra is consistent with an animal that measured 10 to 12 m (33 to 39 ft) in wingspan.

=== Skull ===
The skull of Hatzegopteryx was gigantic, with an estimated length of 2.5 m (8 ft 2 in) based on comparisons with Nyctosaurus and Anhanguera, making it one of the largest skulls among non-marine animals. The skull was broadened in the rear, being 0.5 m (1 ft 8 in) wide across the quadrate bones. While most pterosaur skulls are composed of gracile plates and struts, in Hatzegopteryx, the skull bones are stout and robust, with large ridges indicating strong muscular attachments. In 2018, Mátyás Vremir concluded that Hatzegopteryx likely had a shorter and broader skull, the length of which he estimated at 1.6 m (5 ft 3 in), and he also estimated its wingspan to be smaller than others at 8 m (26 ft).

The massive jaw bore a distinctive groove at its point of articulation (also seen in some other pterosaurs, including Pteranodon) that would have allowed the mouth to achieve a very wide gape. Unpublished remains attributed to Hatzegopteryx suggest that it had a proportionally short, deep beak, grouping with the "blunt-beaked" azhdarchids rather than the "slender-beaked" azhdarchids, the latter containing Quetzalcoatlus sp. (now known as the species Q. lawsoni).

=== Cervical vertebrae ===
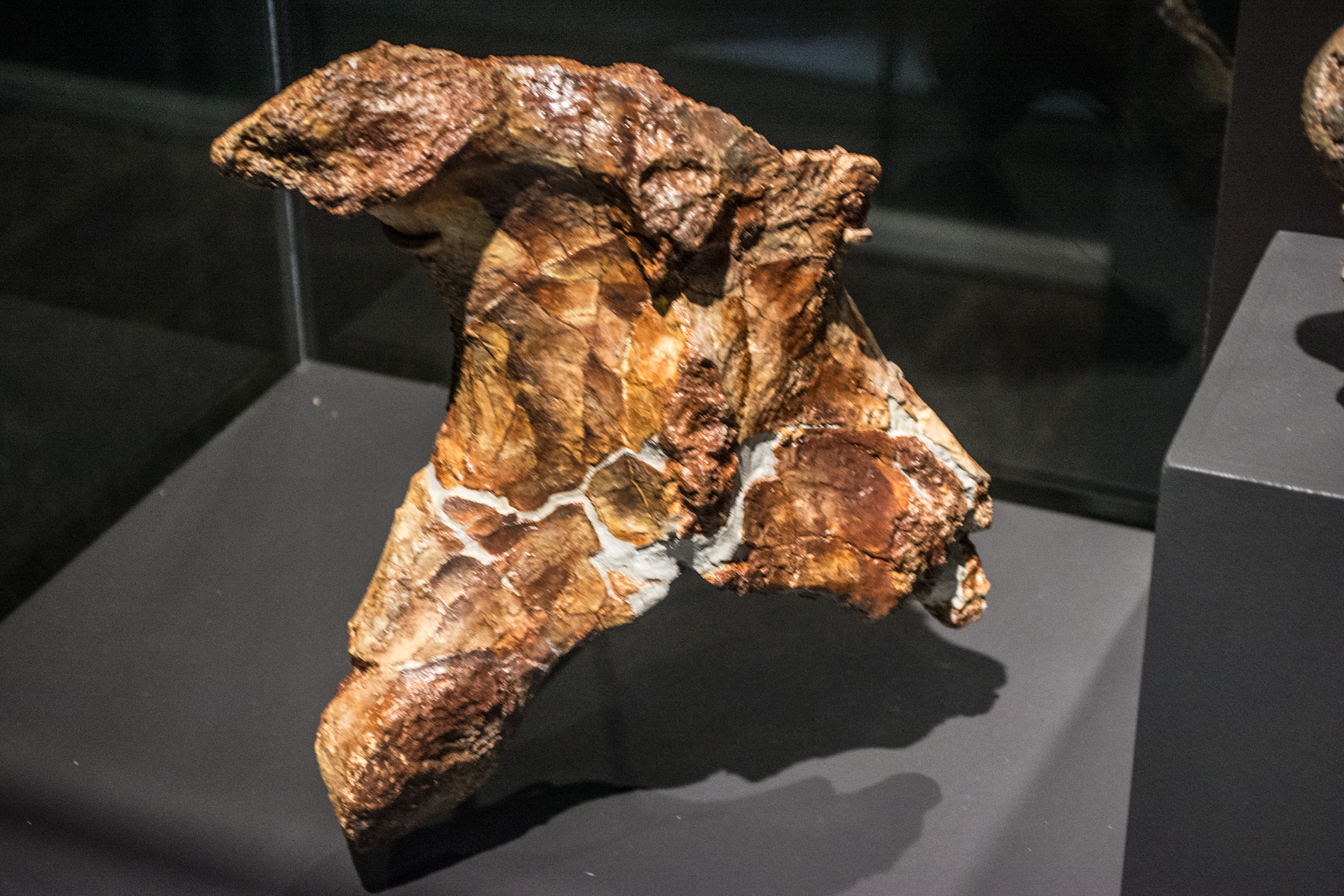
Cast of an assigned neck vertebra, Cleveland Natural History Museum

A large neck vertebra attributed to Hatzegopteryx is short and unusually robust. The preserved portion measures 240 mm (9.4 in) long, with the entire vertebra likely measuring 300 mm (12 in) long in life. Pterosaurs had nine neck vertebrae. Regression indicates that the third to seventh cervical vertebrae would have collectively measured 1.508 m (4 ft 11.4 in) in length, with the longest vertebra - the fifth - only measuring approximately 400 mm (16 in) long. Meanwhile, the same vertebrae in the similarly giant Arambourgiania measured 2.652 m (8 ft 8.4 in). This indicates that the neck of Hatzegopteryx is about 50–60% the length of what would be expected for a giant azhdarchid of its size.

The bottom surface of the neck vertebra was also unusually thick, at 4 to 6 mm (0.16 to 0.24 in). For most other giant azhdarchids, including Arambourgiania, this surface is less than 2.6 mm (0.10 in) thick. Although the neural spine of the vertebra is not completely preserved, the width of the preserved portion suggests that it was relatively tall and robust relative to those of other pterosaurs. Other aspects of the vertebra converge upon the seventh neck vertebra of the smaller Azhdarcho most closely: The articulating sockets (cotyles) are much shallower than the neural arches, and are four times as wide as they are tall, a process on the bottom of the vertebrae, known as a hypapophysis, is present, the processes at the front of the vertebrae, the prezygapophyses, are splayed, and the vertebra has a tapered "waist" in the middle of the centrum. Although initially identified as a third neck vertebra, these traits supports the identification of the vertebra as coming from the rear of the neck, more specifically as being the seventh vertebra.

== Classification ==
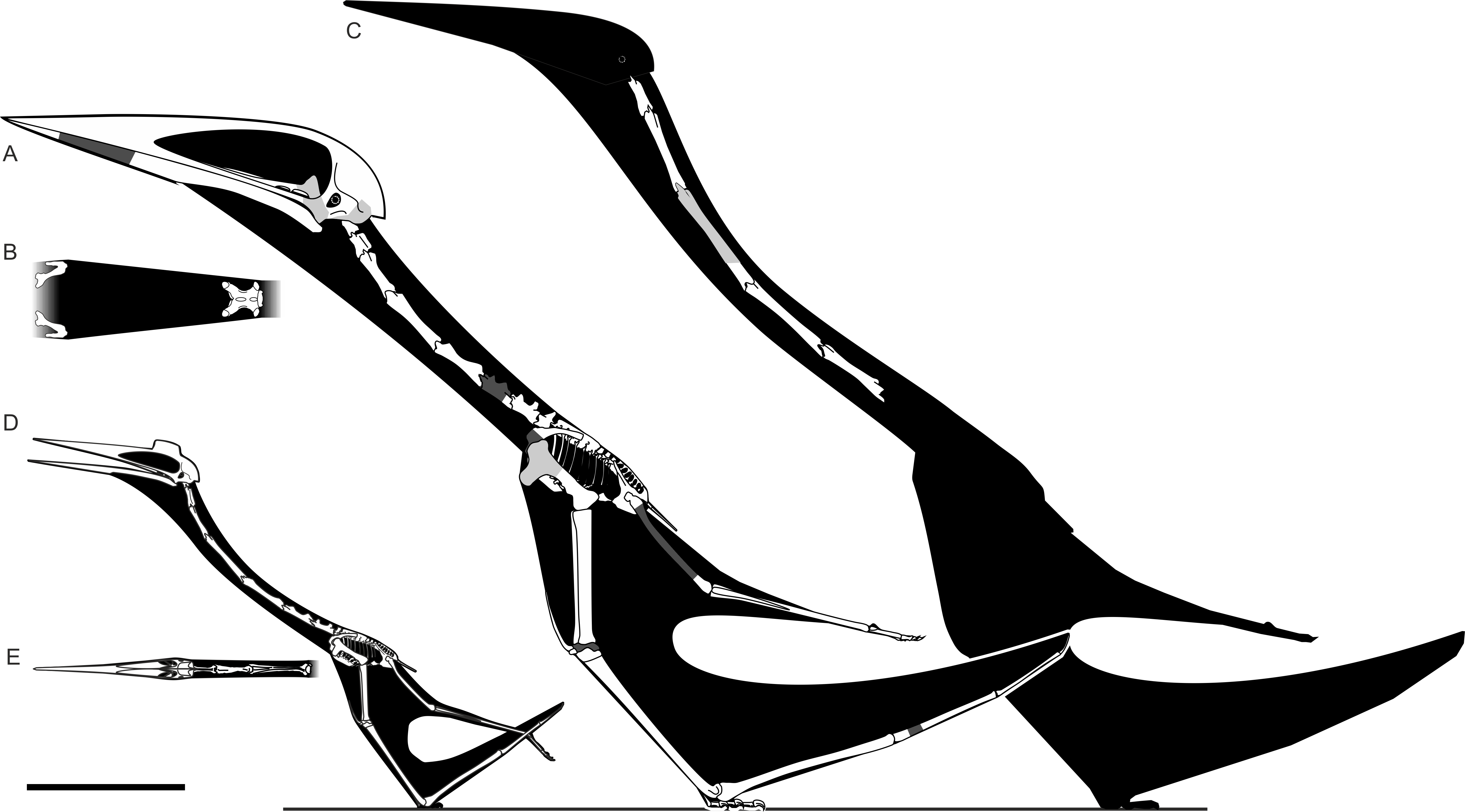
Hatzegopteryx (A-B, holotype in light grey and referred elements in dark grey) compared with Arambourgiania (C) and Quetzalcoatlus lawsoni (D-E)

Similarities between the humerus of Hatzegopteryx and Quetzalcoatlus northropi have been noted, as both of them have a long, smooth deltopectoral crest and a thickened humeral head. These were initially the basis of the taxon's referral to the clade Azhdarchidae, but they are also similar enough to be a basis for the synonymy of Hatzegopteryx and Quetzalcoatlus. However, this is likely due to the relatively non-diagnostic nature of the humerus in giant azhdarchid taxonomy and the lack of a detailed description for the elements of Q. northropi at the time of the assignment. However, the neck and jaw anatomy of Hatzegopteryx is quite clearly distinct from the smaller Q. lawsoni, which warrants the retention of Hatzegopteryx as a taxon separate from Quetzalcoatlus.

The neck vertebra referred to Hatzegopteryx sp. contains a number of traits that allow for it to be definitely identified as that of an azhdarchid. The centrum is relatively low, the zygapophyses are large and flattened, and the preserved portions of the neural spine indicate that it is bifid, or split in half. A phylogenetic analysis conducted by paleontologist Nicholas Longrich and colleagues in 2018 had recovered Hatzegopteryx in a derived (advanced) position within Azhdarchidae. This placement is corroborated in subsequent phylogenetic analyses by Brian Andres in 2021 and by Rubi Pêgas and colleagues in 2023. They both found Hatzegopteryx within the subfamily Quetzalcoatlinae, albeit in different positions. Andres found it in a clade with Arambourgiania and Quetzalcoatlus, while Pêgas and colleagues recovered it as the sister taxon to Albadraco, another pterosaur found in the Hațeg Basin. Their cladograms are shown below:

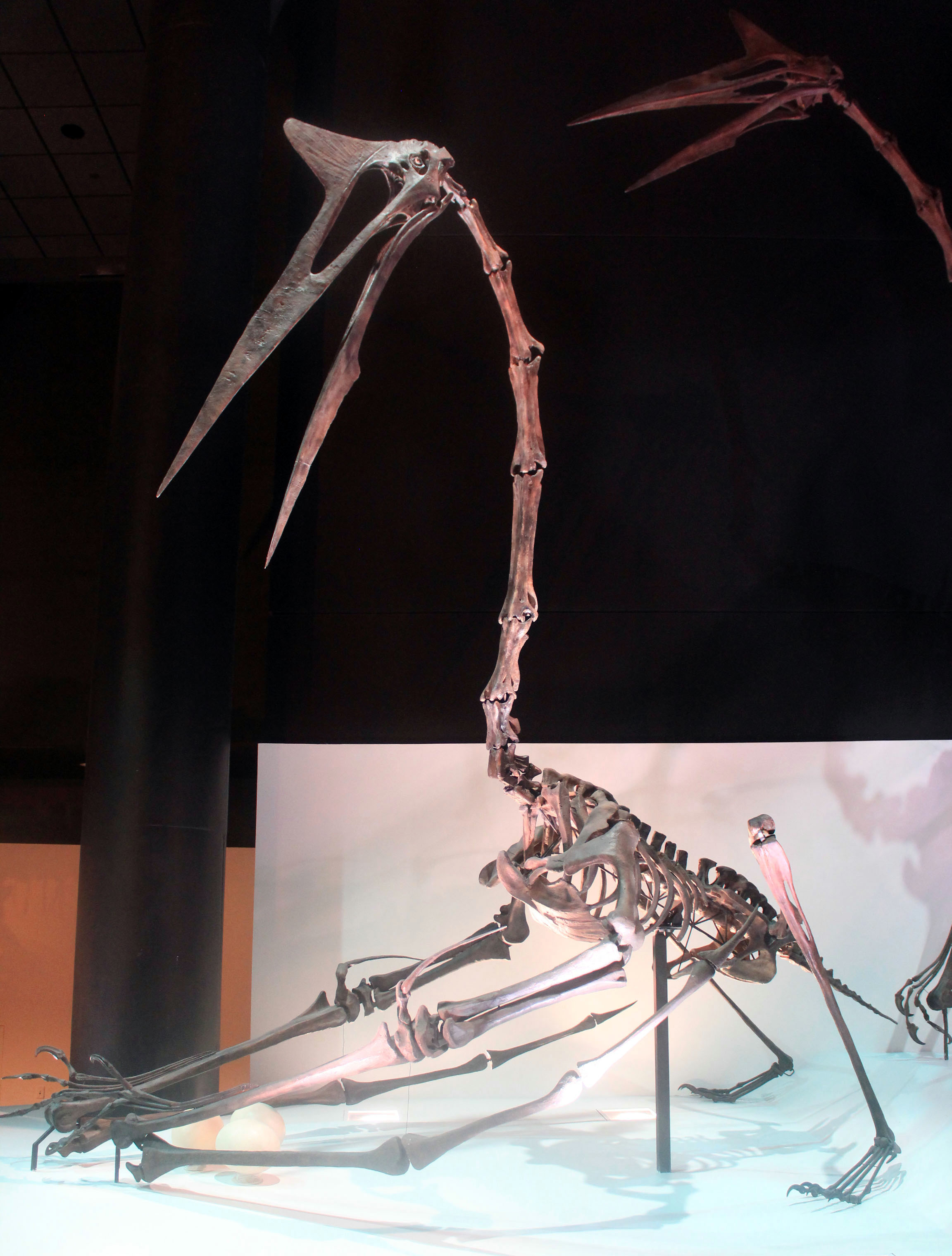
Skeletal reconstruction of the related Quetzalcoatlus

Topology 1: Andres (2021).

- Azhdarchidae
  - Azhdarchinae
    - Azhdarcho lancicollis
    - - Albadraco tharmisensis
      - - Aerotitan sudamericanus
        - Mistralazhdarcho maggii
  - Quetzalcoatlinae
    - - Aralazhdarcho bostobensis
      - Phosphatodraco mauritanicus
    - - Eurazhdarcho langendorfensis
      - - Zhejiangopterus linhaiensis
        - - Wellnhopterus brevirostris
          - Cryodrakon boreas
          - - Hatzegopteryx thambema
            - - Arambourgiania philadelphiae
              - - Quetzalcoatlus lawsoni
                - Quetzalcoatlus northropi

Topology 2: Pêgas and colleagues (2023).

- Azhdarchidae
  - - Eurazhdarcho langendorfensis
    - - Phosphatodraco mauritanicus
      - Wellnhopterus brevirostris
      - Aralazhdarcho bostobensis
  - - Zhejiangopterus linhaiensis
    - - Azhdarcho lancicollis
      - Quetzalcoatlinae
        - Cryodrakon boreas
        - - - Hatzegopteryx thambema
            - Albadraco tharmisensis
          - - - Quetzalcoatlus northropi
              - Quetzalcoatlus lawsoni
              - Quetzalcoatlus sp. (FSAC-OB 14)
            - - Mistralazhdarcho maggii
              - Aerotitan sudamericanus
              - Arambourgiania philadelphiae

== Paleobiology ==
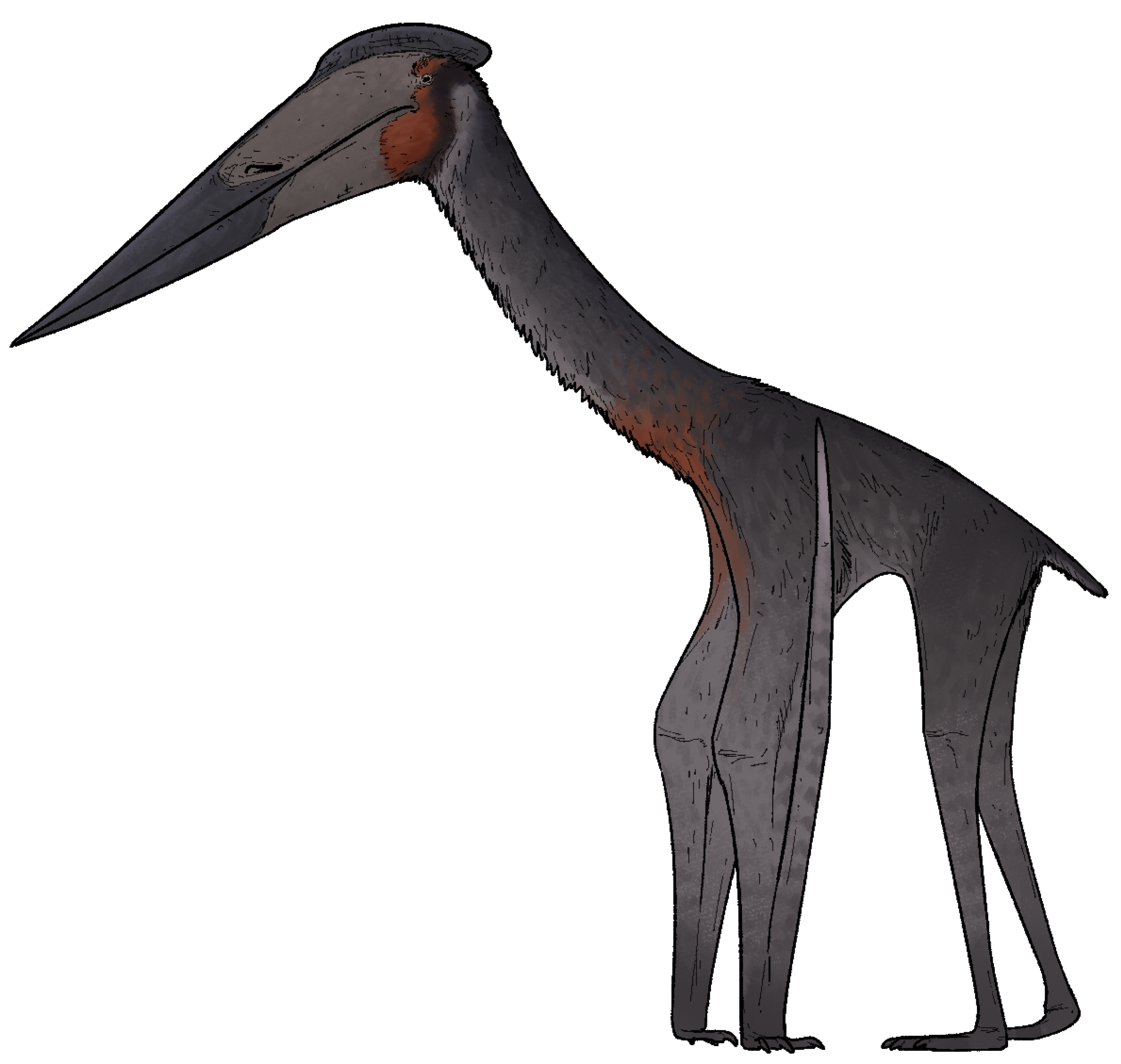
Speculative life reconstruction

=== Bone structure ===
While the skull of Hatzegopteryx was unusually large and robust, its wing bones are comparable to those of other flying pterosaurs, indicating that it was not flightless at all. Buffetaut and colleagues suggested that, in order to fly, the skull weight of Hatzegopteryx must have been reduced in some way. The necessary weight reduction may have been accomplished by the internal structure of the skull bones, which were full of small pits and hollows (alveoli) up to 10 mm (0.39 in) long, separated by a matrix of thin bony struts (trabeculae). The wing bones also bear a similar internal structure. This unusual construction differs from that of other pterosaurs, and more closely resembles the structure of expanded polystyrene (which is used to manufacture Styrofoam). This would have made the skull sturdy and stress-resistant, but also lightweight, enabling the animal to fly. A similar internal structure is also seen in the cervical vertebra referred to Hatzegopteryx.

=== Neck biomechanics ===
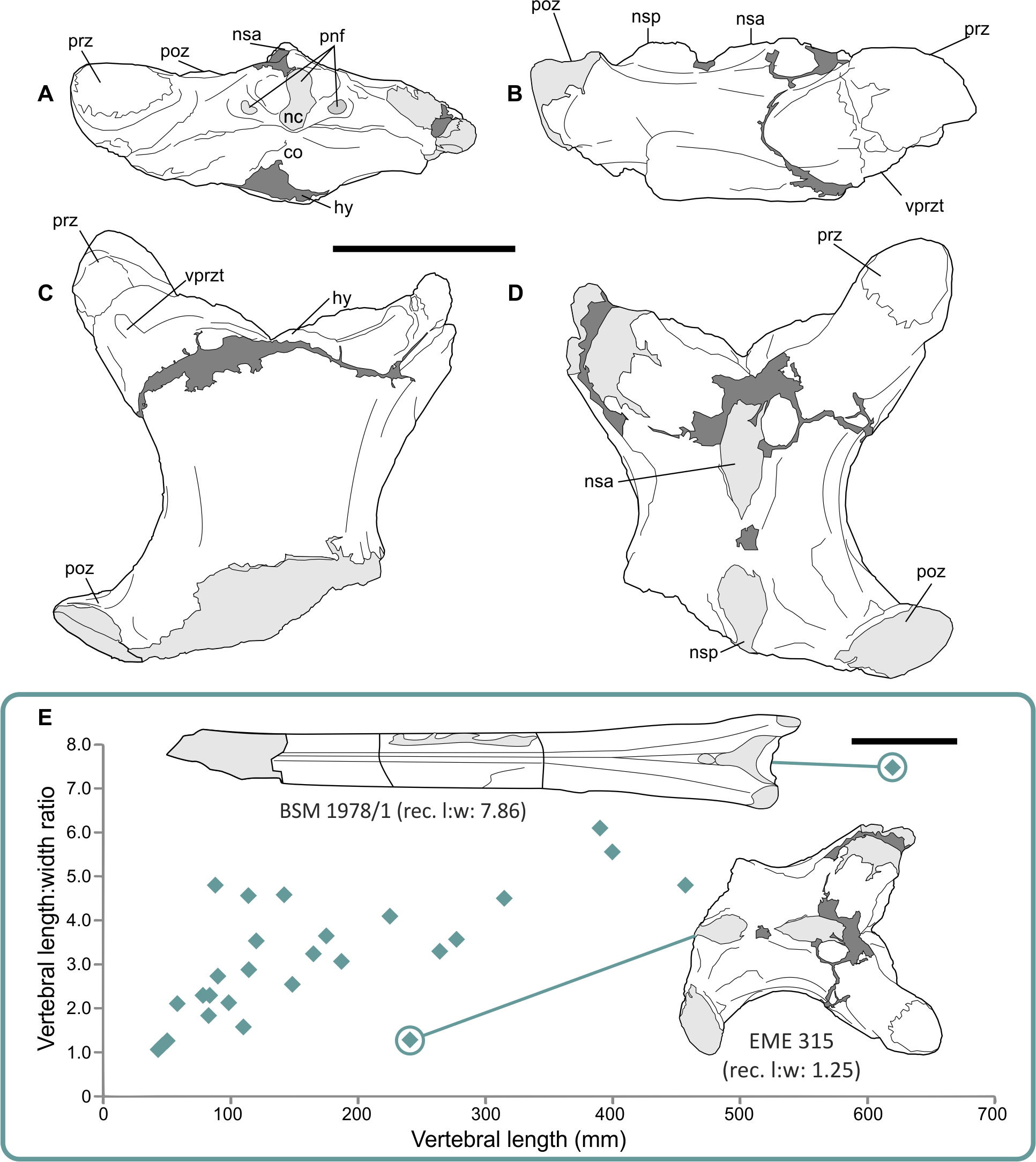
Referred seventh cervical vertebra

As a consequence of its robust, thick-walled vertebrae, the neck of Hatzegopteryx was much stronger than that of Arambourgiania. This can be quantified using relative failure force, which is the bone failure force of a vertebra divided by the body weight of the pterosaur that it belongs to, estimated at 180 to 250 kg (400 to 550 lb) for Arambourgiania and Hatzegopteryx. While Arambourgiania's neck vertebrae fail at about half of its body weight, the posterior neck vertebrae of Hatzegopteryx can withstand anywhere between five and ten body weights, depending on the loading of the bone. Even the hypothetically longer anterior neck vertebrae of Hatzegopteryx would be able to withstand four to seven body weights.

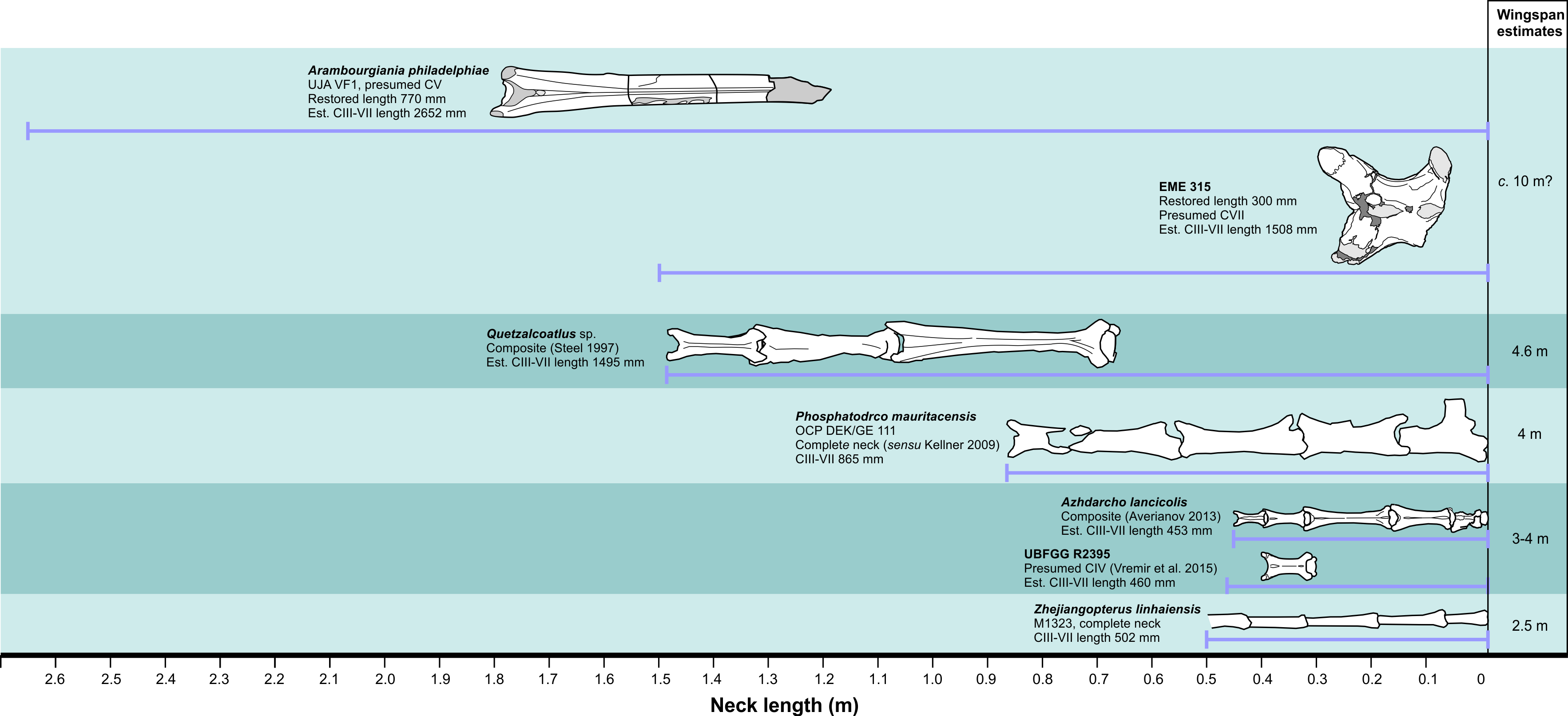
Neck length of Hatzegopteryx (second from top) compared to comparable azhdarchids; Arambourgiania (at top), Quetzalcoatlus sp. (third from top)

Although the centrum of Hatzegopteryx is much more robust than Arambourgiania, their ratios of bone radius to bone thickness (R/t) are roughly the same (9.45 for Hatzegopteryx and 9.9 for Arambourgiania). This may represent a compromise between increasing bending strength and buckling strength. Higher R/t ratios lead to improved bending strength, but weaker buckling strength. To compensate for this, Hatzegopteryx shows a number of other adaptations to improve buckling strength, namely the distinctive internal structures of the bones and the large articular joints of the vertebrae, the latter of which helps to distribute stress.

In order to support the robust head, the neck of Hatzegopteryx was likely strongly muscled. On the occipital bones, the nuchal lines, which serve as muscular attachments, are very well-developed and bear prominent scarring. These conceivably supported the transversospinalis muscles, which aid in extension and flexion of the head and neck. Likewise, the opisthotic process, neural spines, and zygapophyses all appeared to have been large and robust (with the latter bearing many pits and edges that likely represent muscle scars), and the basioccipital tuberosities were long. These all serve as points of attachment for various muscles of the head and neck. Although not entirely unmuscled, the neck of Arambourgiania probably would not have been as extensively muscled as that of Hatzegopteryx.

== Paleoecology ==
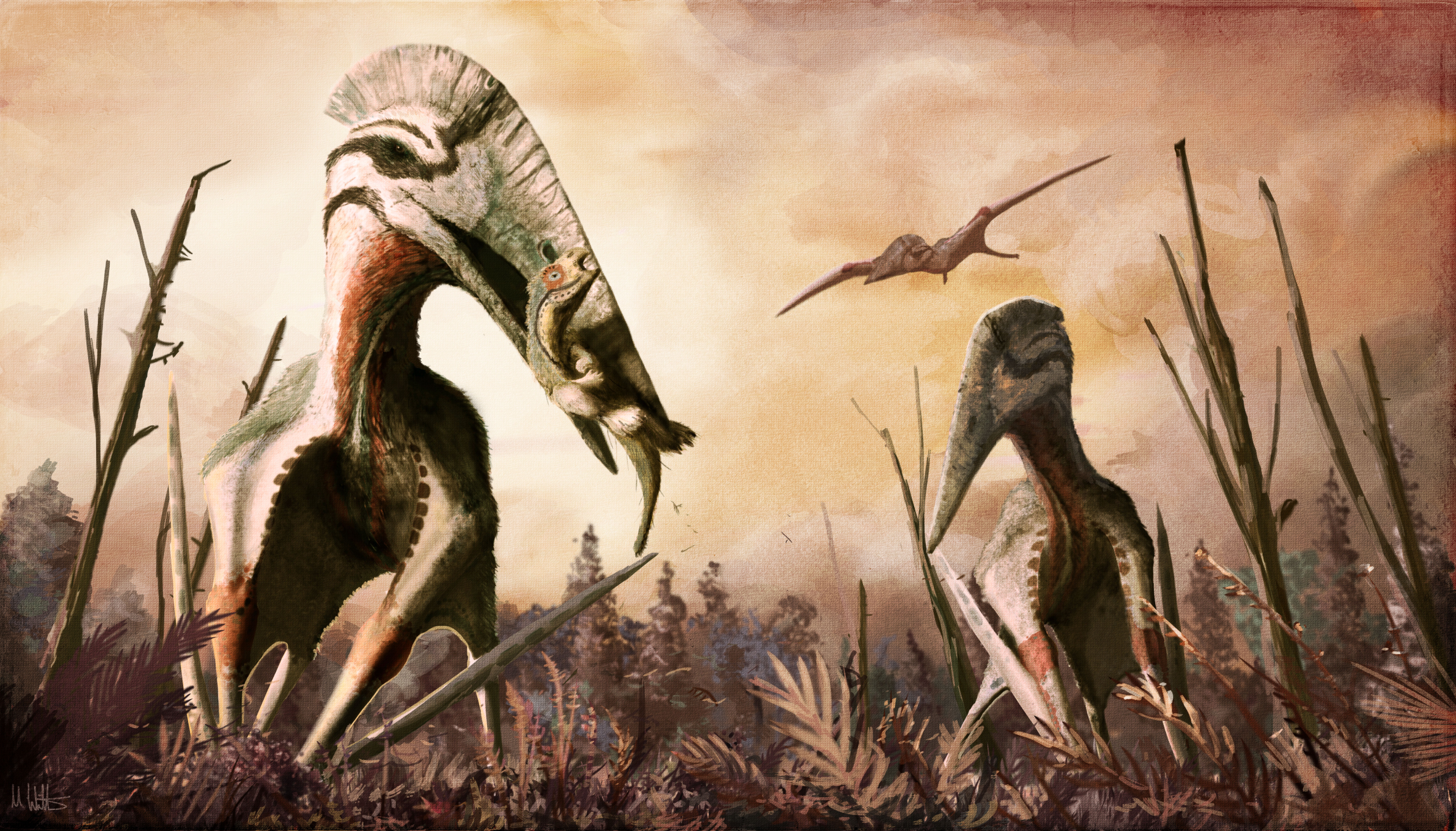
Restoration of Hatzegopteryx species preying on the iguanodont Zalmoxes

Like all azhdarchid pterosaurs, Hatzegopteryx was probably a terrestrially foraging generalist predator. It is significantly larger than any other terrestrial predator from Maastrichtian Europe. This, due to its large size in an environment otherwise dominated by island dwarf dinosaurs (with no large hypercarnivorous theropods in the region) it has been suggested that Hatzegopteryx played the role of an apex predator in the Hațeg Island ecosystem. The robust anatomy of Hatzegopteryx suggests that it may have tackled larger prey than other azhdarchids, including animals too large to swallow whole. Meanwhile, other giant azhdarchids, like Arambourgiania, would probably have instead fed on small prey (up to the size of a human), including hatchling or small dinosaurs and eggs. Another pterosaur, Thalassodromeus, has similarly been suggested to be raptorial.

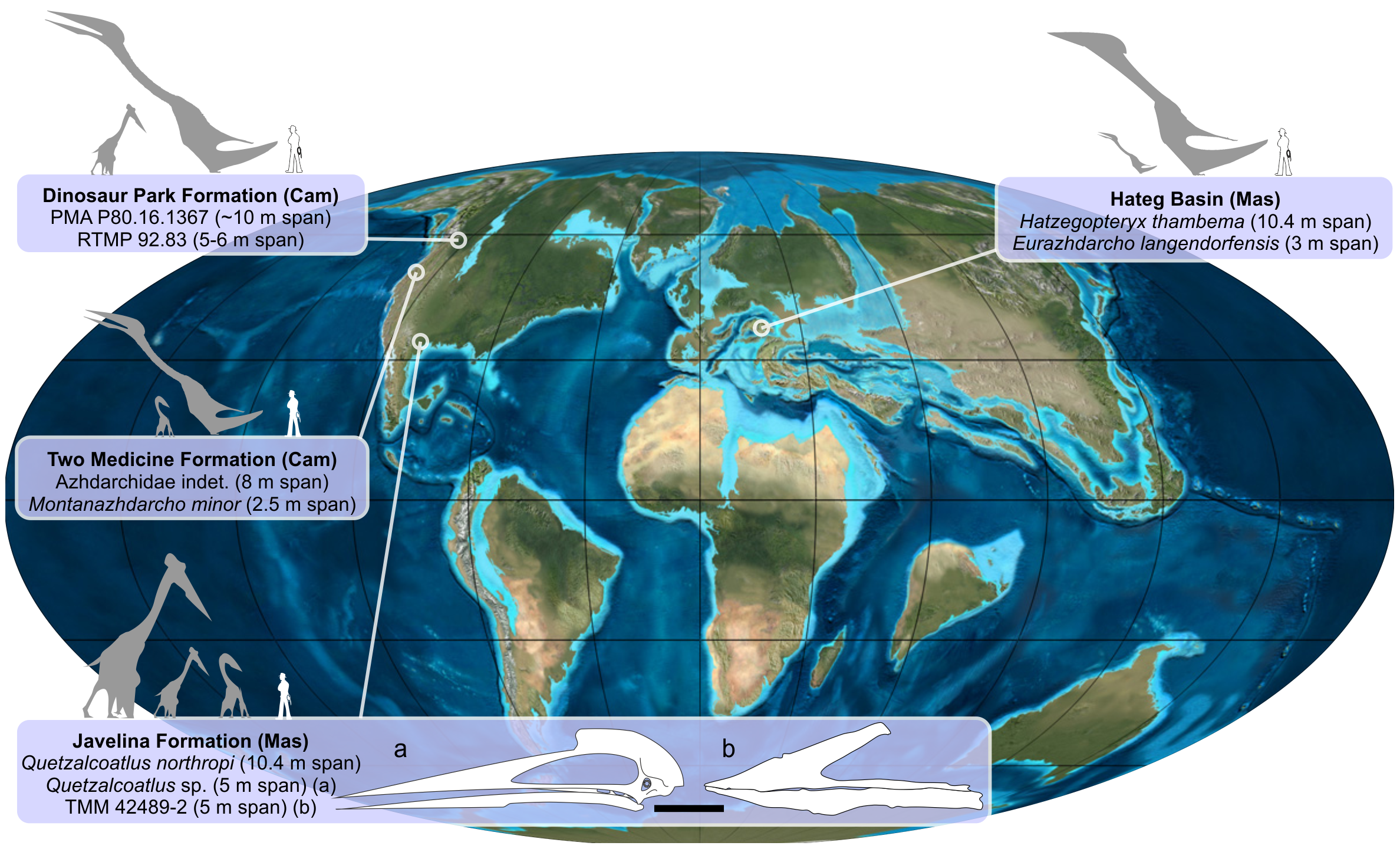
Map showing diverse Late Cretaceous azhdarchid assemblages worldwide

Apart from Hatzegopteryx, there are various other unusual denizens of the Hațeg Island ecosystem. Co-occurring pterosaurs included the small azhdarchid Eurazhdarcho, with a wingspan of 3.8 m (12 ft), an unnamed, small-sized short-necked azhdarchid with a wingspan of 3.5 to 4 m (11.5 to 13.1 ft), a somewhat larger and likewise unnamed azhdarchid, with a wingspan of 5 m (16.4 ft), and apparently small pteranodontids have been found as well. The robust, flightless, and possibly herbivorous avialan or dromaeosaurid Balaur, which had two enlarged claws on each foot, represents another highly specialized component of the fauna. The ecosystem contained a number of insular dwarfs, namely the titanosaurs Magyarosaurus and Paludititan, the hadrosaurid Telmatosaurus, and the iguanodontian Zalmoxes. Along with the nodosaurid Struthiosaurus, various small, fragmentary maniraptorans were present, including Bradycneme, Elopteryx, and Heptasteornis. Crocodilian remains, belonging to the genera Allodaposuchus, Doratodon, and Acynodon have also been found. Non-archosaurian components include the kogaionid multituberculate mammals Kogaionon ungureanui, Barbatodon, Litovoi tholocephalos, and Hainina, lizards such as the teiid Bicuspidon and the paramacellodid Becklesius, an unnamed madtsoiid snake, and the lissamphibians Albanerpeton, Eodiscoglossus, and Paradiscoglossus.

The importance of this fauna is a major geological justification for the designation of the area from 2004 to 2005 as Hațeg Country Dinosaurs Geopark, one of the earliest members of the European Geoparks Network, and (when the designation of UNESCO Global Geoparks was ratified in 2015) as Haţeg UNESCO Global Geopark.

During the Maastrichtian, southern Europe was an archipelago. The members of the Hațeg Island ecosystem lived on a landmass known as the Tisia–Dacia Block, of which the Hațeg Basin was a small part. This landmass was about 80,000 km^{2} (31,000 sq mi) in area, and was separated from other terrestrial terrains by stretches of deep ocean in all directions by 200 to 300 km (120 to 190 mi). Being located at 27°N, the island was located farther south than the present-day latitude of 45°N. As such, the climate was likely subtropical, with distinct dry and wet seasons, and had an average temperature of about 25 °C (77 °F). The environment consisted of various alluvial plains, wetlands, and rivers, surrounded by woodlands dominated by ferns and angiosperms. Paleosols indicate a relatively dry Cretaceous climate, with an annual precipitation of less than 1,000 mm (39 in).

== See also ==
- List of pterosaur genera
- Timeline of pterosaur research
- Pterosaur size
