= Anconodon =

Anconodon Temporal range: Paleocene

Scientific classification
- Kingdom: Animalia
- Phylum: Chordata
- Class: Mammalia
- Order: †Multituberculata
- Family: †Cimolodontidae
- Genus: †Anconodon; G. L. Jepsen, 1940

Species
- A. cochranensis; A. gidleyi; A. lewisi

Extinct family of mammals

Anconodon is an extinct genus of mammal from the Paleocene of North America, and thus lived just after the "age of the dinosaurs". It was a member of the extinct order Multituberculata within the suborder Cimolodonta and possibly the family Cimolodontidae.

The genus Anconodon was named by G. L. Jepsen in 1940. It is also known as Ectopodon (Russell 1967); Ectypodus (partly); Liotomus (partly); and Ptilodus (partly).

== Species ==
The species Anconodon cochranensis was named by Russell in 1929 and Van Valen and Sloan in 1966. It has also been known as A. russelli (Simpson 1935; Jepsen 1940); Ectopodon cochranensis (Russel 1967); Ectypodus cochranensis (Simpson 1937a); Ectypodus russelli (Simpson 1935d); Liotomus russelli; and Ptilodus cochranensis (Russell 1929). Fossil remains have been found in the Tiffanian (Middle-Upper Paleocene)-age strata of Alberta (Canada) and Montana and Wyoming (United States). It has been cited as a descendant of A. gidleyi. The holotype is in the University of Alberta collection. The body mass has been estimated to be about 55 g, the weight of two standard mice.

The species Anconodon gidleyi was named by Simpson G.G. in 1935 and Jepsen G.L. in 1940. It has also been known as A. gibleyi and Ptilodus ?gidleyi (Simpson 1935d). Fossil remains have been found in the Torrejonian (Middle-Upper Paleocene)-age strata of the Gidley Quarry in Montana and in Wyoming, New Mexico and Alberta. This species is cited as a possible descendant of Cimolodon nitidus.

The species: Anconodon lewisi was named by Sloan R.E. in 1987. Fossil remains were discovered in the Middle-Upper Paleocene-age strata of Keefer Hill in Wyoming and Douglass Quarry in Montana. The holotype is from Wyoming.
