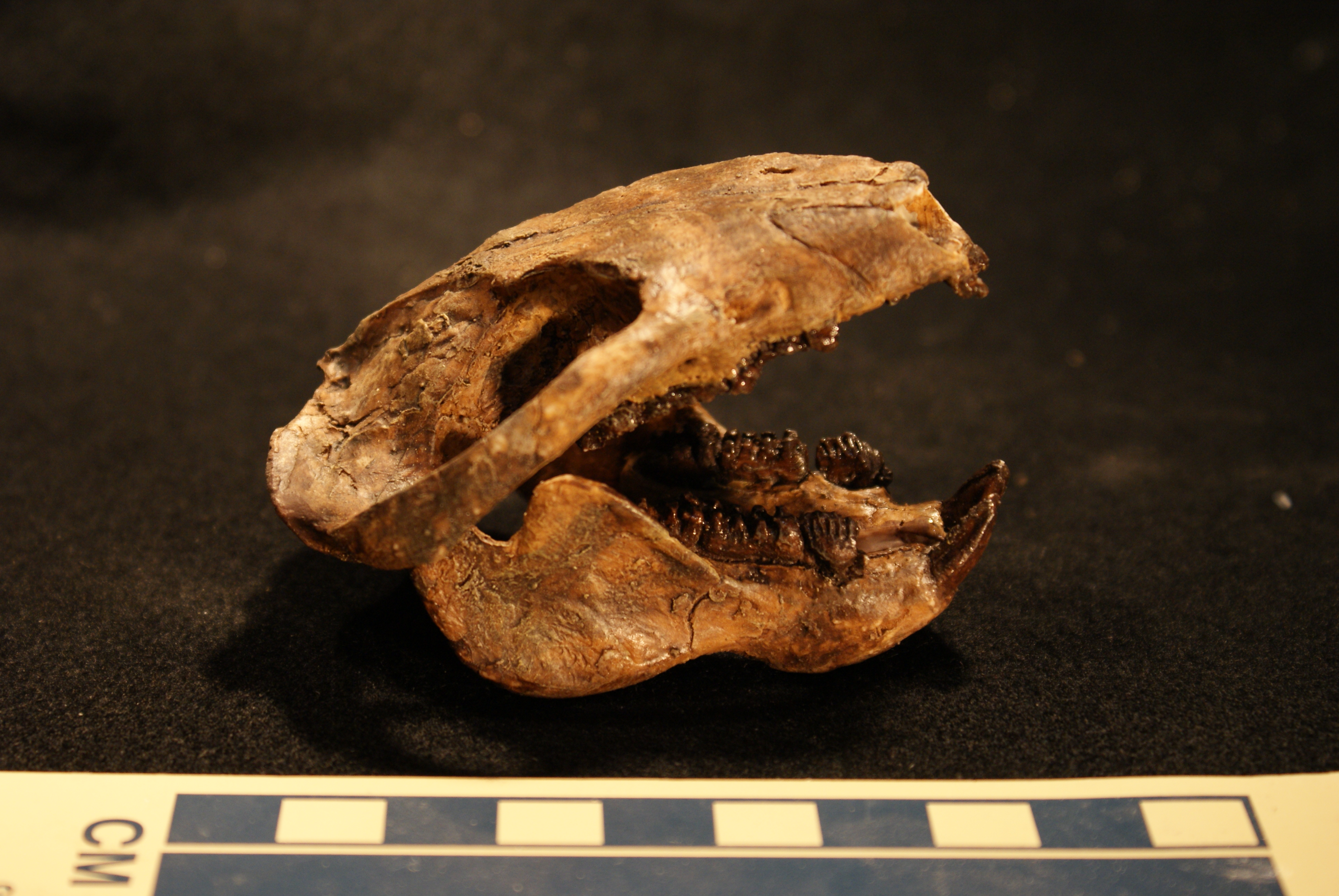
- Skull of Meniscoessus

Scientific classification
- Kingdom: Animalia
- Phylum: Chordata
- Class: Mammalia
- Order: †Multituberculata
- Suborder: †Cimolodonta; McKenna, 1975

Subgroups
- Boffiidae; Cimolomyidae; Corriebaataridae; Djadochtatherioidea; Eucosmodontidae; Kogaionidae; Microcosmodontidae; Ptilodontoidea; Taeniolabidoidea

= Cimolodonta =

Cimolodonta Temporal range: Aptian-Eocene 125–35 Ma

Extinct suborder of mammals

Cimolodonta is a clade of multituberculate mammals that lived from the Cretaceous to the Eocene. They probably lived something of a rodent-like existence until their ecological niche was assumed by true rodents. The more basal multituberculates are found in a different suborder, "Plagiaulacida", a paraphyletic group containing all non cimolodontan multituberculates.

Cimolodonta is apparently a natural (monophyletic) suborder. Remains have been identified from across the Northern Hemisphere. They first appeared during the Aptian, and completely replaced the more primitive plagiaulacidans by the early Late Cretaceous. The taxon is recognized as the informal "Paracimexomys group" and the superfamilies Djadochtatherioidea, Taeniolabidoidea, and Ptilodontoidea. Additionally, and of uncertain affinities, are the families Cimolomyidae, Boffiidae, Eucosmodontidae, Kogaionidae, Microcosmodontidae and the two genera Uzbekbaatar and Viridomys. More precise placement of these types awaits further discoveries and analysis.

== Taxonomy ==
Suborder †Cimolodonta McKenna, 1975

- Superfamily Incertae sedis
  - Family Incertae sedis
    - Subfamily Incertae sedis
      - Genus ?Ameribaatar Eaton & Cifelli, 2001
      - Genus ?Barbatodon Rãdulescu & Samson, 1986
      - Genus ?Bryceomys Eaton, 1995
      - Genus Cedaromys Eaton & Cifelli, 2001
      - Genus ?Dakotamys Eaton, 1995; (Early Cretaceous, Central North America)
      - Genus ?Fractinus Higgins, 2003
      - Genus Halodon Marsh, 1889
      - Genus Koshikibaatar Sera, 2026
      - Genus Ptilodus (Marsh, 1889) Gidley, 1909
      - Genus ?Uzbekbaatar Kielan-Jaworowska & Nesov, 1992
- "Paracimexomys group" Archibald, 1982
  - Genus Cimexomys Sloan & Van Valen, 1965
  - Genus Paracimexomys Archibald, 1982
- Family Boffiidae Hahn & Hahn, 1983
  - Genus Boffius Vianey-Liaud, 1979
- Family Cimolomyidae Marsh, 1889 sensu Kielan-Jaworowska & Hurum, 2001
  - Genus Camurodon Shelley et al., 2026
  - Genus Buginbaatar Kielan-Jaworowska & Sochava, 1969
  - Genus Cimolomys Marsh, 1889 (syn. ?Allacodon Marsh, 1889; Meniscoessus; Ptilodus; Selenacodon Marsh, 1889)
  - Genus Essonodon Simpson, 1927
  - Genus Meniscoessus Cope, 1882 (syn. Dipriodon Marsh, 1889, Tripriodon Marsh, 1889, Selenacodon Marsh, 1889, Halodon Marsh, 1889, Oracodon Marsh, 1889)
- Superfamily Ptilodontoidea Cope, 1887 sensu McKenna & Bell, 1997 & Kielan-Jaworowska & Hurum, 2001
  - Family Cimolodontidae Marsh, 1889 sensu Kielan-Jaworowska & Hurum, 2001
    - Genus Anconodon Jepsen, 1940
    - Genus Cimolodon Marsh, 1889 (syn. Nanomys Marsh, 1889, Nonomyops Marsh, 1892)
    - Genus Essonodon Simpson, 1927
    - Genus Liotomus Lemoine, 1882
    - Genus Neoliotomus Jepsen, 1930
  - Family Ptilodontidae Cope, 1887 (syn. Ptilodontinae Cope, 1887 sensu McKenna & Bell, 1997)
    - Genus Baiotomeus Krause, 1987
    - Genus Kimbetohia Simpson, 1936
    - Genus Prochetodon Jepsen, 1940
    - Genus Ptilodus Cope, 1881 (Chirox Cope, 1884)
  - Family Neoplagiaulacidae Ameghino, 1890 (syn. Neoplagiaulacinae Ameghino, 1890 sensu McKenna & Bell, 1997)
    - Genus Cernaysia Vianey-Liaud, 1986
    - Genus Ectypodus Matthew & Cranger, 1921 (syn. Charlesmooria Kühne, 1969)
    - Genus Krauseia Vianey-Liaud, 1986
    - Genus Mesodma Marsh, 1889
    - Genus Mesodmops Tong & Wang, 1994
    - Genus Mimetodon Jepsen, 1940
    - Genus Neoplagiaulax Lemoine, 1882
    - Genus Parectypodus Jepsen, 1930
    - Genus Xanclomys Rigby, 1980
    - Genus Xyronomys Rigby, 1980
  - Family Kogaionidae Rãdulescu & Samson, 1996
    - Genus Barbatodon Rãdulescu & Samson, 1996
    - Genus Hainina Vianey-Liaud, 1979
    - Genus Kogaionon Rãdulescu & Samson, 1996
  - Family Eucosmodontidae Jepsen, 1940 sensu Kielan-Jaworowska & Hurum, 2001 (syn. Eucosmodontinae Jepsen, 1940 sensu McKenna & Bell, 1997)
    - Genus Clemensodon Krause, 1992
    - Genus Eucosmodon Matthew & Granger, 1921
    - Genus Stygimys Sloan & Van Valen, 1965
  - Family Microcosmodontidae Holtzman & Wolberg, 1977 (syn. Microcosmodontinae Holtzman & Wolberg, 1977 McKenna & Bell, 1997)
    - Genus Acheronodon Archibald, 1982
    - Genus Kaniqsiqcosmodon Shelley et al., 2026
    - Genus Microcosmodon Jepsen, 1930
    - Genus Pentacosmodon Jepsen, 1940
- Superfamily Djadochtatherioidea Kielan-Jaworowska & Hurum, 1997 sensu Kielan-Jaworowska & Hurum, 2001 (syn. Djadochtatheria Kielan-Jaworowska & Hurum, 1997)
  - Genus ?Bulganbaatar Kielan-Jaworowska, 1974
  - Genus ?Chulsanbaatar Kielan-Jaworowska, 1974
  - Genus Nemegtbaatar Kielan-Jaworowska, 1974
  - Family Sloanbaataridae Kielan-Jaworowska, 1974
    - Genus Kamptobaatar Kielan-Jaworowska, 1970
    - Genus Nessovbaatar Kielan-Jaworowska & Hurum, 1997
    - Genus Sloanbaatar Kielan-Jaworowska, 1974
  - Family Djadochtatheriidae Kielan-Jaworowska & Hurum, 1997
    - Genus Catopsbaatar Kielan-Jaworowska, 1974
    - Genus Djadochtatherium Simpson, 1925
    - Genus Kryptobaatar Kielan-Jaworowska, 1970 (syn. Gobibaatar Kielan-Jaworowska, 1970, Tugrigbaatar Kielan-Jaworowska & Dashzeveg, 1978)
    - Genus Tombaatar Kielan-Jaworowska, 1974
    - Genus Qayaqgruk Shelley et al., 2026
- Superfamily Taeniolabidoidea Granger & Simpson, 1929 sensu Kielan-Jaworowska & Hurum, 2001
  - Genus Prionessus Matthew & Granger, 1925
  - Family Taeniolabididae Granger & Simpson, 1929
    - Genus Kimbetopsalis Sarah, 2015
    - Genus Taeniolabis Cope, 1882
  - Family Lambdopsalidae Chow & Qi, 1978
    - Genus Lambdopsalis Chow & Qi, 1978
    - Genus Sphenopsalis Matthew, Granger & Simpson, 1928
