= Pentacosmodon =

Pentacosmodon Temporal range: Paleocene

Scientific classification
- Kingdom: Animalia
- Phylum: Chordata
- Class: Mammalia
- Order: †Multituberculata
- Family: †Microcosmodontidae
- Genus: †Pentacosmodon
- Species: †P. pronus

Binomial name
- †Pentacosmodon pronus Jepsen, 1940

Extinct family of mammals

Pentacosmodon is a mammal genus from the Paleocene of North America, so it lived somewhat after the "age of the dinosaurs". It was a member of the extinct order Multituberculata. It is within the suborder Cimolodonta and family Microcosmodontidae.

The genus Pentacosmodon, named by Jepsen in 1940, is known from the species Pentacosmodon pronus. Fossil remains of this animal have been found in strata dating to the Upper Paleocene of Wyoming, United States, and the Porcupine Hills Formation near the Bow River of Alberta, Canada. This genus was previously placed within family Djadochtatherioidea.
