= Sloanbaatar =

Sloanbaatar Temporal range: Late Cretaceous

Scientific classification
- Domain: Eukaryota
- Kingdom: Animalia
- Phylum: Chordata
- Class: Mammalia
- Order: †Multituberculata
- Family: †Sloanbaataridae
- Genus: †Sloanbaatar
- Species: †S. mirabillis

Binomial name
- †Sloanbaatar mirabillis Kielan-Jaworowska, 1970

Genus of mammals

Sloanbaatar is a mammal genus that lived in Mongolia during the Upper Cretaceous. It lived at the same time as the dinosaurs. This animal was a member of the also extinct order Multituberculata within the suborder Cimolodonta and the family Sloanbaataridae.

The genus Sloanbaatar was named by Kielan-Jaworowska, Z. in 1970. The name means "Sloan's hero", in honour of paleontologist R.E. Sloan.

Fossil remains of the only known species, Sloanbaatar mirabillis, have been found in the Coniacian - Santonian (Upper Cretaceous)-age strata of the Djadokhta Formation in Mongolia.
