= Acheronodon =

Acheronodon Temporal range: 66–56.8 Ma

Scientific classification
- Kingdom: Animalia
- Phylum: Chordata
- Class: Mammalia
- Order: †Multituberculata
- Family: †Microcosmodontidae
- Genus: †Acheronodon; Archibald J.D., 1982
- Species: †A. garbani

Binomial name
- †Acheronodon garbani Archibald J.D., 1982

Extinct family of mammals

Acheronodon is a genus of herbivorous arboreal mammal which belongs to the family Microcosmodontidae and which was endemic to North America during the Early Paleocene subepoch (66—56.8 mya) and in existence for approximately 9.2 million years.

It is a member of the extinct order Multituberculata and lies within the suborder Cimolodonta.

The species Acheronodon garbani is known from fossils found in the Puercan (Paleocene)-age formations of Tullock Formation in Montana (United States) and possible specimens from the Porcupine Hills in Alberta, Canada. The holotype was found in Montana.
