= Microcosmodontidae =

Microcosmodontidae Temporal range: Late Cretaceous - early Paleocene

Scientific classification
- Kingdom: Animalia
- Phylum: Chordata
- Class: Mammalia
- Order: †Multituberculata
- Suborder: †Cimolodonta
- Family: †Microcosmodontidae

Genera
- Acheronodon; Kaniqsiqcosmodon; Microcosmodon; Pentacosmodon

Extinct family of mammals

Microcosmodontidae is a poorly preserved family of fossil mammals within the extinct order Multituberculata. Representatives are known from the Lower Paleocene of North America. The family is part of the suborder Cimolodonta. Other than that, their systematic relationships are hard to define.

These microcosmodontids were rather small and had a "large lower incisor with a restricted enamel band, (Kielan-Jaworowska & Hurum 2001, p.417). This grouping has also be seen as Microcosmodontinae Holtzman & Wolberg, 1977, within Eucosmodontidae. However, "Microcosmodontidae (new rank assigned by Fox to the subfamily Microcosmodontinae)," (Kielan-Jaworowska & Hurum, 2001).
