= Xyronomys =

Xyronomys Temporal range: 63.3–61.7 Ma

Scientific classification
- Kingdom: Animalia
- Phylum: Chordata
- Class: Mammalia
- Order: †Multituberculata
- Family: †Neoplagiaulacidae
- Genus: †Xyronomys; J. K. Rigby, 1980

Species
- X. swainae X. robinsoni

Extinct family of mammals

Xyronomys is an extinct genus of small mammals from the Paleocene of North America, with two described species. The genus lies within the extinct order Multituberculata within the suborder Cimolodonta and family Neoplagiaulacidae.

The species Xyronomys swainae (J. K. Rigby, 1980) was found in Torrejonian (Paleocene)-age strata of Swain Quarry in Wyoming, United States. Represented by a couple of teeth, this genus was originally assigned to Eucosmodontidae. Kielan-Jaworowska and Hurum (2001, p. 406) refer it to Neoplagiaulacidae on the basis of its possession of microprismatic enamel, i.e. the tooth enamel is built up from small prisms.

A second species Xyronomys robinsoni was found in Puercan (Lower Paleocene)-age strata of Colorado, US and was named by Middleton and Dewar in 2004.

Material assigned to this genus has also been reported from Rav W-1 in Saskatchewan, Canada.
