= Nessovbaatar =

Nessovbaatar Temporal range: Santonian-Campanian ~84.9–70.6 Ma

Scientific classification
- Domain: Eukaryota
- Kingdom: Animalia
- Phylum: Chordata
- Class: Mammalia
- Order: †Multituberculata
- Family: †Sloanbaataridae
- Genus: †Nessovbaatar; Kielan-Jaworowska & Hurum 1997

Species
- N. multicostatus

Extinct family of mammals

Nessovbaatar is a genus of extinct mammal from the Upper Cretaceous of Mongolia. It eked out its living in the company of Central Asian dinosaurs. This animal was a member of the extinct order Multituberculata within the suborder Cimolodonta and family Sloanbaataridae.

The genus Nessovbaatar ("Nesov's hero") was named by Kielan-Jaworowska Z. and Hurum J.H. in 1997 in honour of Russian paleontologist Dr. Nesov. The only known species is Nessovbaatar multicostatus (Kielan-Jaworowska & Hurum 1997), fossils of which were found in the Upper Cretaceous Barun Goyot Formation of Mongolia.
