= Djadochtatherioidea =

Djadochtatherioidea Temporal range: Late Cretaceous–Paleocene
- Various skulls

Scientific classification
- Kingdom: Animalia
- Phylum: Chordata
- Class: Mammalia
- Order: †Multituberculata
- Suborder: †Cimolodonta
- Superfamily: †Djadochtatherioidea; Kielan-Jaworowska and Jørn Hurum, 2001

Clades
- Eucosmodontidae; Sloanbaataridae; Djadochtatheriidae; Boffius; Bulganbaatar; Chulsanbaatar; Nemegtbaatar

Extinct superfamily of mammals

Djadochtatherioidea is a superfamily of extinct mammals known from the upper Cretaceous and Paleocene of what is now Central Asia, North America and Europe. They were members of the order Multituberculata. These were very ecologically diverse; several were jerboa-like hoppers, while others like Mangasbaatar were large sized and fossorial. Unusually for multituberculates, some of this group are represented by very good remains. All upper Cretaceous Mongolian multituberculates are included with one exception, the genus Buginbaatar.

This superfamily is further subdivided into three families and several other genera, as listed in the table. The Djadochtatherioids are within the suborder of Cimolodonta. Djadochtatherioidea was established by Zofia Kielan-Jaworowska and Jørn Hurum in 2001 as a replacement for the previously proposed Djadochtatheria that they had proposed in 1997. Shared characteristics of the group are dental formulas of 2.0.3.21.0.2.2 or 2.0.4.21.0.1.2.
