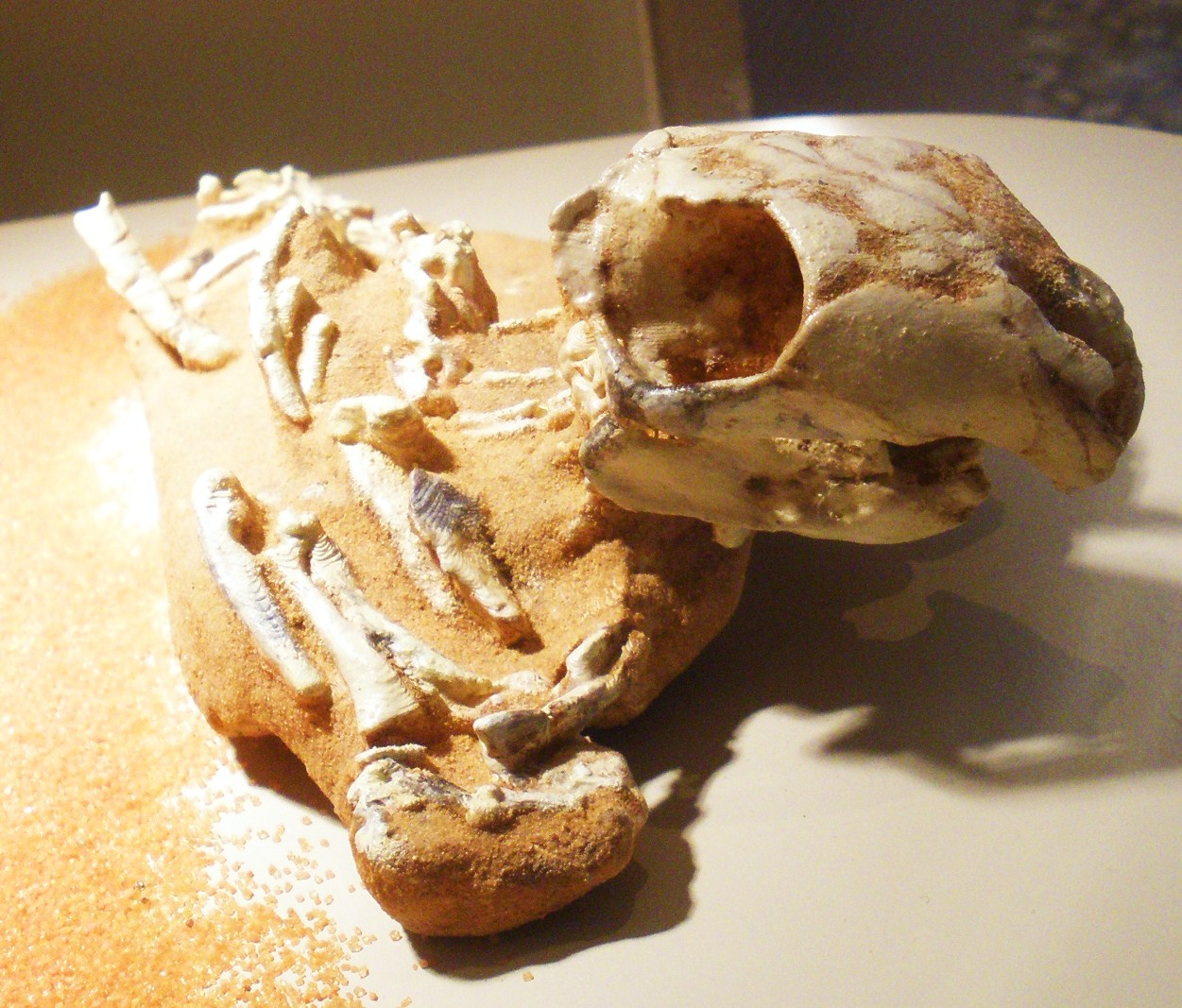
- Kryptobaatar dashzevegi

Scientific classification
- Kingdom: Animalia
- Phylum: Chordata
- Class: Mammalia
- Order: †Multituberculata
- Family: †Djadochtatheriidae
- Genus: †Kryptobaatar

Species
- K. dashzevegi Kielan−Jaworowska, 1969; K. mandahuensis Smith, Guo & Sun, 2001

Synonyms
- Gobibaatar Kielan−Jaworowska, 1969; Tugrigbaatar Kielan−Jaworowska & Dashzeveg, 1978

= Kryptobaatar =

Kryptobaatar Temporal range: Campanian-Maastrichtian

Extinct genus of mammals

Kryptobaatar, also known as Gobibaatar or Tugrigbaatar, is an extinct mammalian genus dating from the Upper Cretaceous Period and identified in Central Asia. This animal was a member of the extinct order of Multituberculata within the suborder Cimolodonta, and was a member of the family Djadochtatheriidae. It lived contemporaneously with some of the dinosaurs. Its skull had a length of perhaps 3 cm.

The generic name Kryptobaatar is derived from Greek κρυπτός: kruptós, "hidden," (alludes to the ventral position of infraorbital foramen) and Mongolian баатар: baatar, "hero" (alludes to the name of the capital of Mongolia, Ulan Baatar). The specific name dashzevegi is named in honour of Mongolian palaeontologist Demberelyin Dashzeveg. The derivation of its synonym Gobibaatar parvus is Gobi (occurring in the Gobi Desert, Mongolia) and baatar ("a hero", the same as Kryptobaatar). Another synonym Tugrigbaatar saichanensis is a generic name derived from the Toogreeg and Ulan Baatar, and a specific name derived from a Gurvan Saykhan mountain range.

== Species identified ==
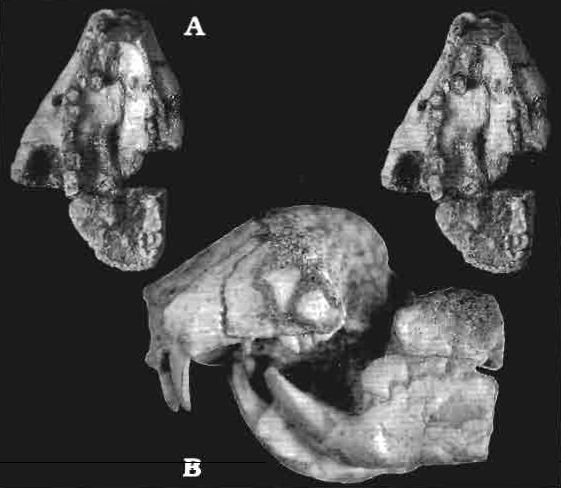
Skull

- Kryptobaatar dashzevegi Kielan−Jaworowska, 1969. At Djadokhta Formation, Ukhaa Tolgod, Tögrög Shiree and Bayan Zag or Baruungoyot Formation, Red beds of Hermiin Tsav, Mongolia. Stage: lower Campanian or Upper Cretaceous. The skull has a length of perhaps 3 cm. The front teeth look impressively sharp and not much like those of a strict vegetarian. Gobibaatar parvus Kielan−Jaworowska, 1969 and Tugrigbaatar saichanensis Kielan−Jaworowska & Dashzeveg, 1978 are now treated as synonyms of K. dashzevegi by Kielan-Jaworowska et al. (2003).
- Kryptobaatar mandahuensis Smith, Guo & Sun, 2001. At Bayan Mandahu Formation, Urad Houqi Banner, Inner Mongolia, China. Based on several well-preserved skulls. This location is about the same stage as the Djadokhta Formation of Mongolia, Campanian (Upper Cretaceous).

== Biology ==
Kryptobaatar was a hopping species, similar to a modern Jerboa. It is thought to have been a carnivory-oriented omnivore.
