= Bulganbaatar =

Bulganbaatar Temporal range: Late Cretaceous

Scientific classification
- Kingdom: Animalia
- Phylum: Chordata
- Class: Mammalia
- Order: †Multituberculata
- Superfamily: †Djadochtatherioidea
- Genus: †Bulganbaatar; Zofia Kielan-Jaworowska, 1974

Species
- †B.nemegtbaataroides

Extinct genus of mammals

Bulganbaatar is an extinct genus of early mammals from the Upper Cretaceous.

It is a member of the extinct order Multituberculata. It lies within the suborder Cimolodonta and is a member of the superfamily Djadochtatherioidea. The genus Bulganbaatar was named by Zofia Kielan-Jaworowska in 1974 after the village of Bulgan situated near Bayn Dzak. It is one of many Cretaceous aged mammal discoveries made by Kielan-Jaworowska and co-workers from Central Asian sites. Kielan-Jaworowska considered B.nemegtbaatorides to be the ancestor to the genus Nemegtbaatar due to similarity but more derived teeth in the latter, hence the names. According to Kielan-Jaworowska and Hurum, both Bulganbaatar and Nemegtbaatar are distinctive for exhibiting "elongation of the last upper premolar and molars, and an increase in their cusp numbers."

Fossil remains of Bulganbaatar have been found in Upper Cretaceous-aged strata of the Djadokhta Formation of Mongolia and Kazakhstan. Their appearances range between 84 and 81 million years ago, from the late Santonian to the early Campanian ages.
