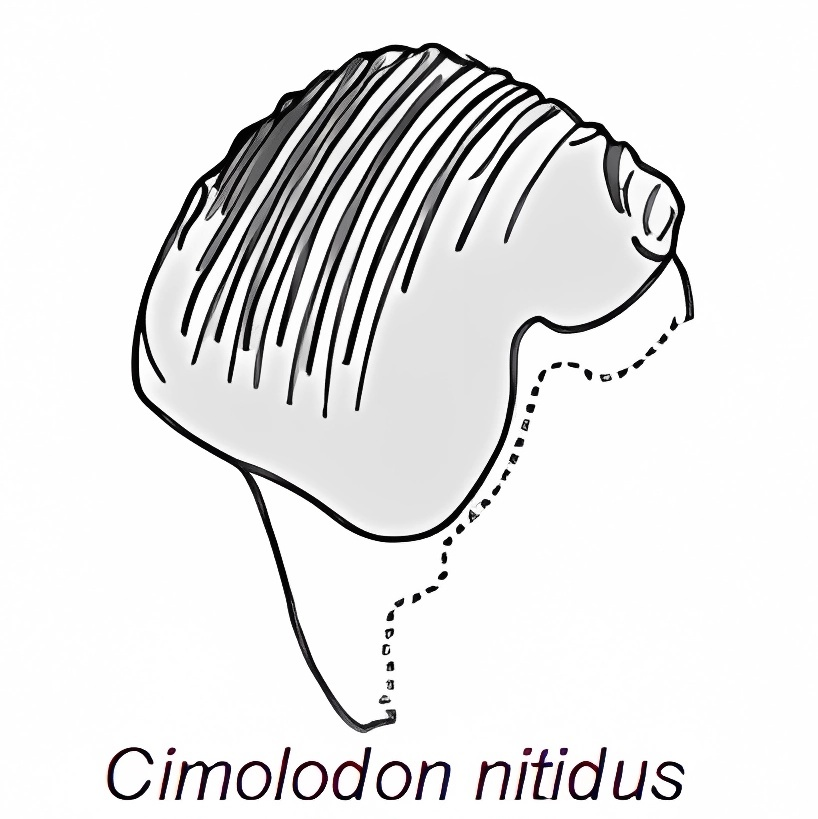
- Premolar

Scientific classification
- Kingdom: Animalia
- Phylum: Chordata
- Class: Mammalia
- Order: †Multituberculata
- Family: †Cimolodontidae; Marsh, 1889

Genera
- Cimolodon; Anconodon; Liotomus

= Cimolodontidae =

Cimolodontidae Temporal range: Late Cretaceous–Paleocene

Extinct family of mammals

Cimolodontidae is a family of fossil mammals within the extinct order Multituberculata. Representatives are known from the Upper Cretaceous and Paleocene of North America. The family Cimolodontidae was named by Othniel Charles Marsh in 1889 and is part of the suborder Cimolodonta within the superfamily Ptilodontoidea.
