= Sloanbaataridae =

Sloanbaataridae Temporal range: Late Cretaceous

Scientific classification
- Domain: Eukaryota
- Kingdom: Animalia
- Phylum: Chordata
- Class: Mammalia
- Order: †Multituberculata
- Suborder: †Cimolodonta
- Family: †Sloanbaataridae

Genera
- Sloanbaatar; Kamptobaatar; Nessovbaatar

Extinct family of mammals

Sloanbaataridae is a family of fossil mammals within the extinct order Multituberculata. Remains are known from the Upper Cretaceous of Mongolia. These small herbivores lived during the "age of the dinosaurs". This family is part of the suborder Cimolodonta. The family Sloanbaataridae was named by Kielan-Jaworowska, Z. in 1974.
