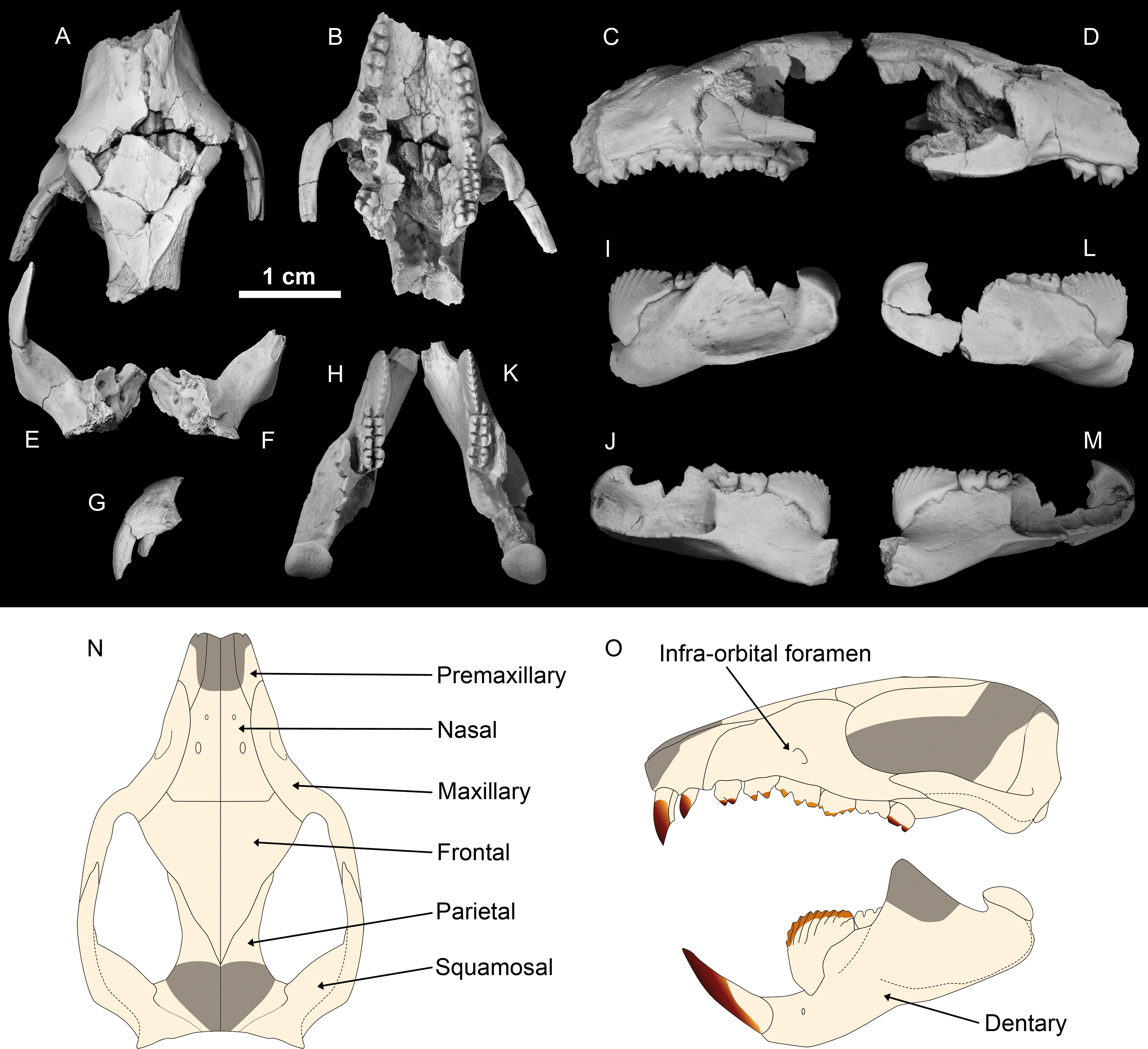
- Skull of Barbatodon transylvanicus

Scientific classification
- Kingdom: Animalia
- Phylum: Chordata
- Class: Mammalia
- Order: †Multituberculata
- Family: †Kogaionidae
- Genus: †Barbatodon; Radulesco & Samson 1986

Species
- B. oardaensis; B. transylvanicus; B. ungureanui

= Barbatodon =

Barbatodon Temporal range: Maastrichtian ~70–66 Ma

Extinct family of mammals

Barbatodon is a mammal genus from the Upper Cretaceous period. It lived in Transylvania at the same time as some of the last dinosaurs and was a member of the extinct order of Multituberculata. It is within the suborder of Cimolodonta, and the family Kogaionidae. The genus Barbatodon was named by Constantin Rădulescu and Petre Mihai Samson in 1986.

The primary species, Barbatodon transylvanicum, was also named by Rãdulescu and Samson. It was found in strata dating to the Maastrichtian (Late Cretaceous) of the Sânpetru Formation in Romania.

"Based on comparisons with the m1s from Vălioara, the holotype of Barbatodon is regarded as a kogaionid m1," Kielan-Jaworowska and Hurum (2001) had it placed tentatively in the informal 'Paracimexomys group'.

A new species, B. oardaensis, has been announced in 2014. The species has been discovered in Oarda de Jos, Hațeg Basin, Transylvania. It is characterized by M1 cusp formula 3:4:2 and is much smaller than the two other known species.

Most of Europe was covered by shallow seas during the Upper Cretaceous, which makes remains of terrestrial animals extremely rare. This location is one of the exceptions and the diversity of material is impressive.

== Biology ==
Like modern rodents and shrews, as well as the related taeniolabidoid multituberculates, Barbatodon displays red iron-pigmentation in its teeth. This distribution is more similar to that seen in shrews than in rodents or taeniolabidoids, suggesting insectivorous habits. In the absence of competing mammals, Barbatodon and similar kogaionids display a clear example of island speciation.
