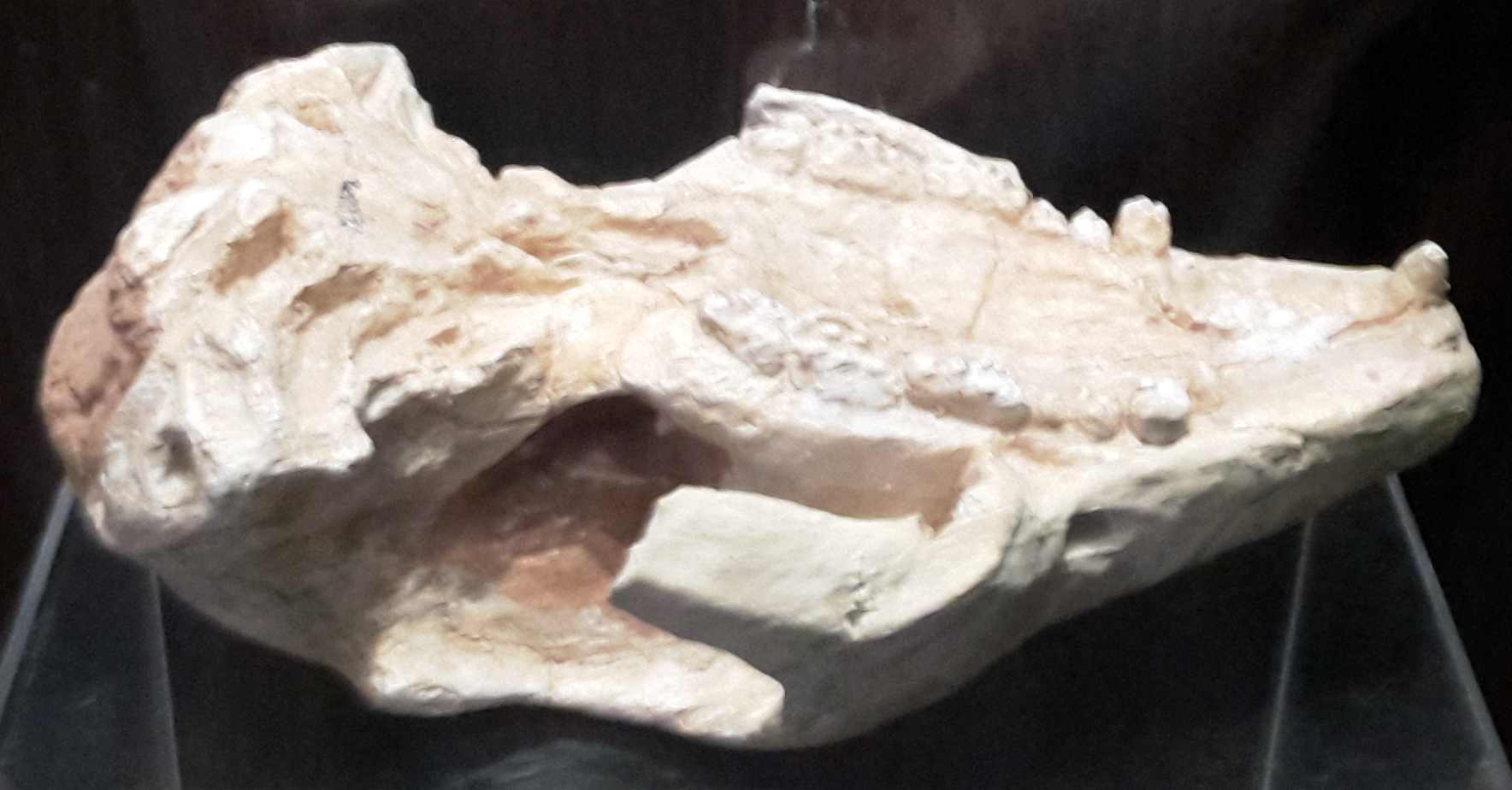
- Skull replica shown from below, Museum of Evolution of Polish Academy of Sciences, Warsaw

Scientific classification
- Kingdom: Animalia
- Phylum: Chordata
- Class: Mammalia
- Order: †Multituberculata
- Superfamily: †Djadochtatherioidea
- Genus: †Chulsanbaatar
- Species: †C. vulgaris

Binomial name
- †Chulsanbaatar vulgaris Zofia Kielan-Jaworowska, 1974

= Chulsanbaatar =

Chulsanbaatar Temporal range: Santonian-Campanian ~84.9–70.6 Ma

Extinct genus of mammals

Chulsanbaatar is an extinct genus of mammal from the Cretaceous of Mongolia. It was a member of the order of Multituberculata and is within the suborder Cimolodonta. The genus Chulsanbaatar was named by Zofia Kielan-Jaworowska in 1974, after the locality of Khulsan near the dig sites where these organisms were found, and Ulaanbaatar, the capital of Mongolia.

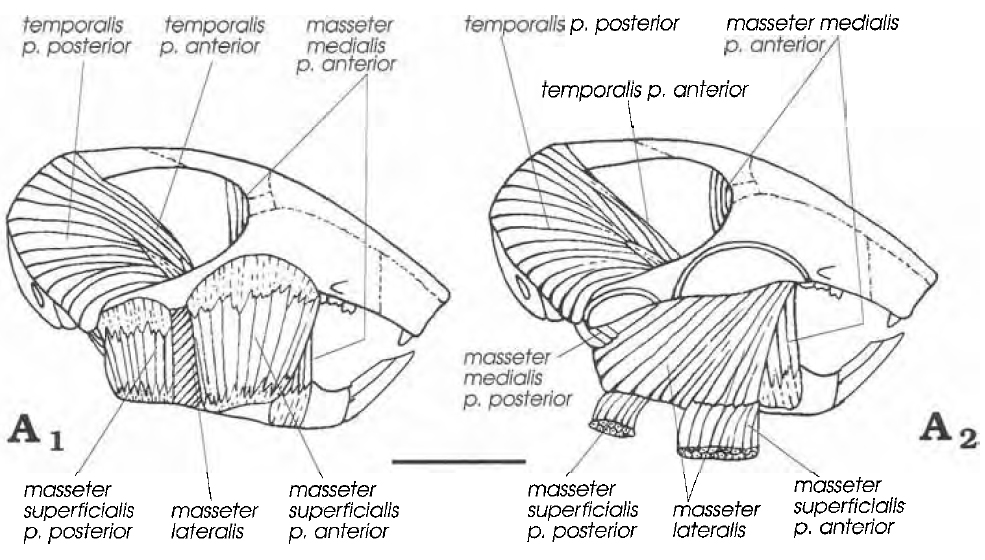
Jaw musculature

Fossil remains of the species Chulsanbaatar vulgaris have been found in multiple localities in the Gobi Desert, including the Red Beds of Hermiin Tsav (also known as Khermeen Tsav, part of the Barun Goyot Formation) in Mongolia. They range in the fossil record from 84 to 71 million years ago, from the late Santonian, through the Campanian and early Maastrichtian ages.

This small multituberculate had a 2 centimetres (0.79 in) long skull. Remarkably, it has been possible to study the ear bones, which shows how well some of the fossils are preserved. With several intact skulls having been found, it can be determined that C.vulgaris has a dental formula of 2.0.4.21.0.2.2. The adult body mass has been estimated at 12 grams (0.42 oz), which is similar to a small modern mouse. According to detailed reconstructions by Kielan-Jaworowska and Gambaryan, Chulsanbaatar was likely nocturnal due its large eyes, and had live births but relatively undeveloped young due to its pelvic structure. It likely was behaviorially similar to that of the modern gerbil.

The type specimen of Chulsanbaatar is now a resident of the Polish Academy of Science in Warsaw, Poland. (ZPAL MgM-I/189). Kielan-Jaworowska noted C.vulgaris to be the most commonly found mammal in Campanian aged Gobi Desert dig sites and was precisely why she gave the species that name (common = Latin: vulgaris).

== Sources ==
- Dykes, Trevor. "Mesozoic Mammals; Djadochtatherioidea, an internet directory". Archived from the original on 21 April 2003.
- Kielan-Jaworowska, Zofia (1974). "Multituberculate succession in the Late Cretaceous of the Gobi Desert (Mongolia)". Palaeontologica Polonica. 30: 23–44.
- Turnbull, W.D. (1995). "Book Review, Postcranial anatomy and habits of Asian multituberculate mammals: : Z. Kielan-Jaworowska and P.P. Gambaryan, 1994. Scandinavian University Press, Oslo, Norway. Paperback, 92 pp. ISBN 82-00-37650-8". Earth-Science Reviews. 39 (3–4): 267–268. doi:10.1016/0012-8252(95)90020-9.
- Wilson, Gregory P.; Evans, Alistair R.; Corfe, Ian J.; Smits, Peter D.; Fortelius, Mikael; Jernvall, Jukka (2012). "Adaptive radiation of multituberculate mammals before the extinction of dinosaurs". Nature. 483: 457–460. doi:10.1038/nature10880.
