= Litovoi tholocephalos =

Litovoi tholocephalos Temporal range: Late Cretaceous

Scientific classification
- Kingdom: Animalia
- Phylum: Chordata
- Class: Mammalia
- Order: †Multituberculata
- Family: †Kogaionidae
- Genus: †Litovoi; Csiki-Sava et al., 2018
- Species: †L. tholocephalos

Binomial name
- †Litovoi tholocephalos Csiki-Sava et al., 2018

Extinct species of mammal

Litovoi tholocephalos is a multituberculate mammal indigenous to Romania, then the Hațeg Island. A part of Kogaionidae, a lineage otherwise dominated by iron-enamelled insectivores, Litovoi appears to have had a similar lifestyle, having similar teeth. Different however is its cranial anatomy; this is the first recorded example of a Mesozoic island mammal to have reduced its brain size in an insular environment, presumably due to the lack of predators or specialised niche it found itself in. It has one of the smallest brain-to-body ratios seen in derived mammals, although it retains enlarged olfactory bulbs and paraflocculi. Being relatively normal sized for a multituberculate, this showcases that brain reduction is not correlated to allometry.
