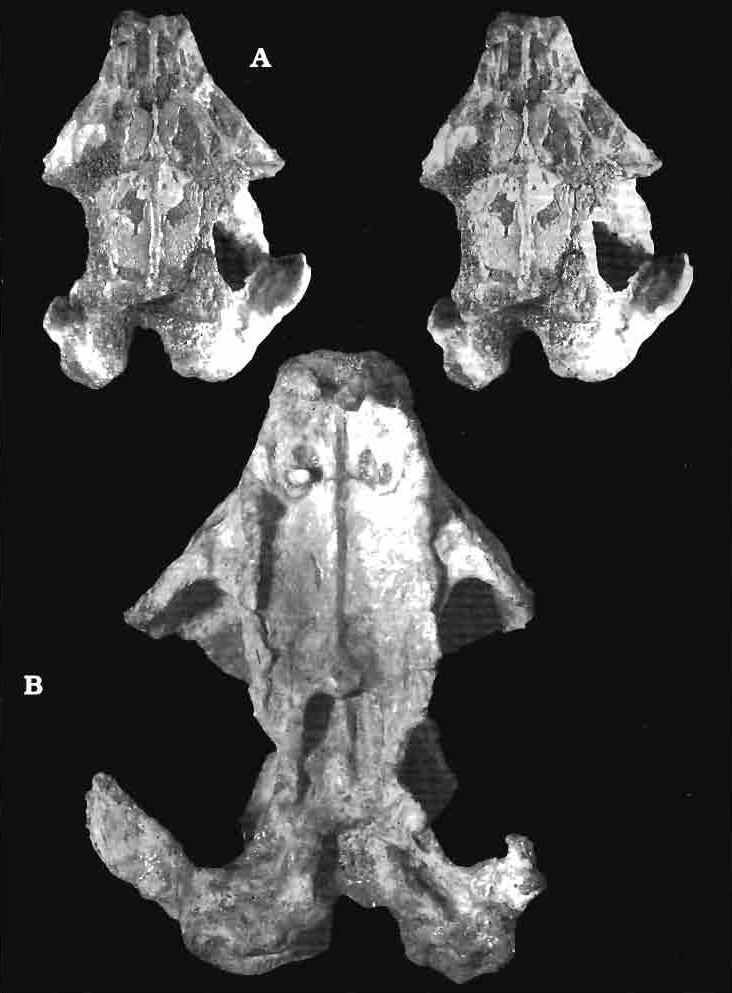
- Skulls seen from above

Scientific classification
- Domain: Eukaryota
- Kingdom: Animalia
- Phylum: Chordata
- Class: Mammalia
- Order: †Multituberculata
- Family: †Sloanbaataridae
- Genus: †Kamptobaatar
- Species: †K. kuczynskii

Binomial name
- †Kamptobaatar kuczynskii Kielan-Jaworowska, 1970

= Kamptobaatar =

Kamptobaatar Temporal range: Late Cretaceous

Genus of mammals

Kamptobaatar is a Mongolian mammal genus from the Upper Cretaceous. It lived at the same time as the later dinosaurs. This animal was a member of the extinct order Multituberculata within the suborder Cimolodonta and family Sloanbaataridae.

The genus Kamptobaatar ("bent hero") was named by Zofia Kielan-Jaworowska in 1970 based on a single species. "Bent" refers to the observable bend of the zygomatic arches in the skull.

Fossil remains of the species Kamptobaatar kuczynskii are known from the Upper Cretaceous Djadokhta Formation of Mongolia. The skull had a length of about 2 cm (0.79 in), while the whole animal was around 10 cm (3.9 in).
