= Buginbaatar =

Buginbaatar Temporal range: Early Maastrichtian, 70 Ma

Scientific classification
- Kingdom: Animalia
- Phylum: Chordata
- Class: Mammalia
- Order: †Multituberculata
- Family: †Cimolomyidae
- Genus: †Buginbaatar; Kielan-Jaworowska & Sochava AV, 1969
- Species: †B. transaltaiensis

Binomial name
- †Buginbaatar transaltaiensis Kielan-Jaworowska & Sochava AV, 1969

Extinct family of mammals

Buginbaatar is an extinct genus of mammal from the Upper Cretaceous of Mongolia. It is a member of the extinct order Multituberculata, within the suborder Cimolodonta and family Cimolomyidae. It lived towards the end of the Mesozoic era.

The genus Buginbaatar was named by Kielan-Jaworowska Z. and Sochava A.V. in 1969 based on the remains of a single species. Remains of this species, dubbed Buginbaatar transaltaiensis, were found in Upper Cretaceous strata of the Nemegt Formation of Bügiyn Tsav in Mongolia.

Based on the dimensions of its teeth, Buginbaatar was slightly larger than Valenopsalis, which was estimated to weigh around 0.8–1 kilogram (1.8–2.2 lb), comparable to the extant Cynomys. It is the only Cretaceous Mongolian multituberculate not to belong to the family Djadochtatherioidea. Remains are incomplete and the assignment of Buginbaatar to the Cimolomyidae is tentative, (Kielan-Jaworowska & Hurum 2001, p. 408).
