= Microcosmodon =

Microcosmodon Temporal range: 66.043–55.8 Ma

Scientific classification
- Kingdom: Animalia
- Phylum: Chordata
- Class: Mammalia
- Order: †Multituberculata
- Family: †Microcosmodontidae
- Genus: †Microcosmodon

Species
- M. arcuatus; M. conus (type species); M. harleyi; M. rosei; M. woodi

Extinct family of mammals

Microcosmodon is a mammal genus from the Paleocene of North America. It was a member of the extinct order Multituberculata, and lies within the suborder Cimolodonta and family Microcosmodontidae. The genus Microcosmodon was named by G.L. Jepsen in 1930.

== Species ==
The species Microcosmodon arcuatus was named by P.A. Johnston and R.C. Fox in 1984. Fossil remains have been found in the Puercan (Paleocene)-age strata Rav W-1 of Saskatchewan, Canada. The holotype is in the University of Alberta collection. When alive, the creature weighed about the same as a well-fed mouse (about 30 g).

The type species Microcosmodon conus was named by G.L. Jepsen in 1930. Remains have been found in the Tiffanian (Paleocene)-age strata of the Polecat Bench Formation of Wyoming (United States) and Saskatchewan, Canada. This species would have weighed around 15 g.

The species Microcosmodon harleyi was named by A. Weil in 1998. Remains have been found in the Puercan (Paleocene)-age strata of the Tullock Formation in Montana (USA). "The presence of the new species suggests that microcosmodontine species richness in the Western Interior was as high at the beginning of the Paleocene as at its end," (Weil, 1998). The species would have weighed about 20 g.

The species Microcosmodon rosei was named by D.W. Krause in 1980. Remains have been found in the Clarforkian (Paleocene)-age strata of the Willwood Formation of Wyoming. This species weighed a fairly standard mouse-sized 25 g+.

The species Microcosmodon woodi was named by R.C. Holtzman and D.L. Wolberg in 1977. It is also known as Eucosmodontid woodi (Weil 1998). Remains have been found in the Middle Paleocene-age strata of Montana and North Dakota (USA) and Alberta, Canada. However, Weil A. (1998) found that this material "does not belong to this genus or subfamily."
