= Boffius =

Boffius Temporal range: Danian ~65–62 Ma

Scientific classification
- Kingdom: Animalia
- Phylum: Chordata
- Class: Mammalia
- Order: †Multituberculata
- Family: †Boffiidae
- Genus: †Boffius
- Species: †B. splendidus

Binomial name
- †Boffius splendidus Vianey-Liaud M., 1979

Extinct family of mammals

Boffius is a genus of mammal from the Paleocene of Europe, which was named by Vianey-Liaud M. in 1979. It is a member of the extinct order of Multituberculata.

Boffius lies within the suborder Cimolodonta and is the only known member of the family Boffiidae (Hahn & Hahn, 1983). The species Boffius splendidus is known from the Lower Paleocene Hainin Formation found in Hainaut, Belgium. It was a relatively large multituberculate. A 2021 study recovers it as part of Djadochtatherioidea.
