= Tögrög =

Tögrög specifies:

- Mongolian tögrög, the currency of Mongolia
- several Sums (districts) in different Aimags (provinces) of Mongolia:
  - Tögrög, Govi-Altai
  - Tögrög, Övörkhangai
- Tögrögyn Shiree, a paleolontical site in Mongolia
