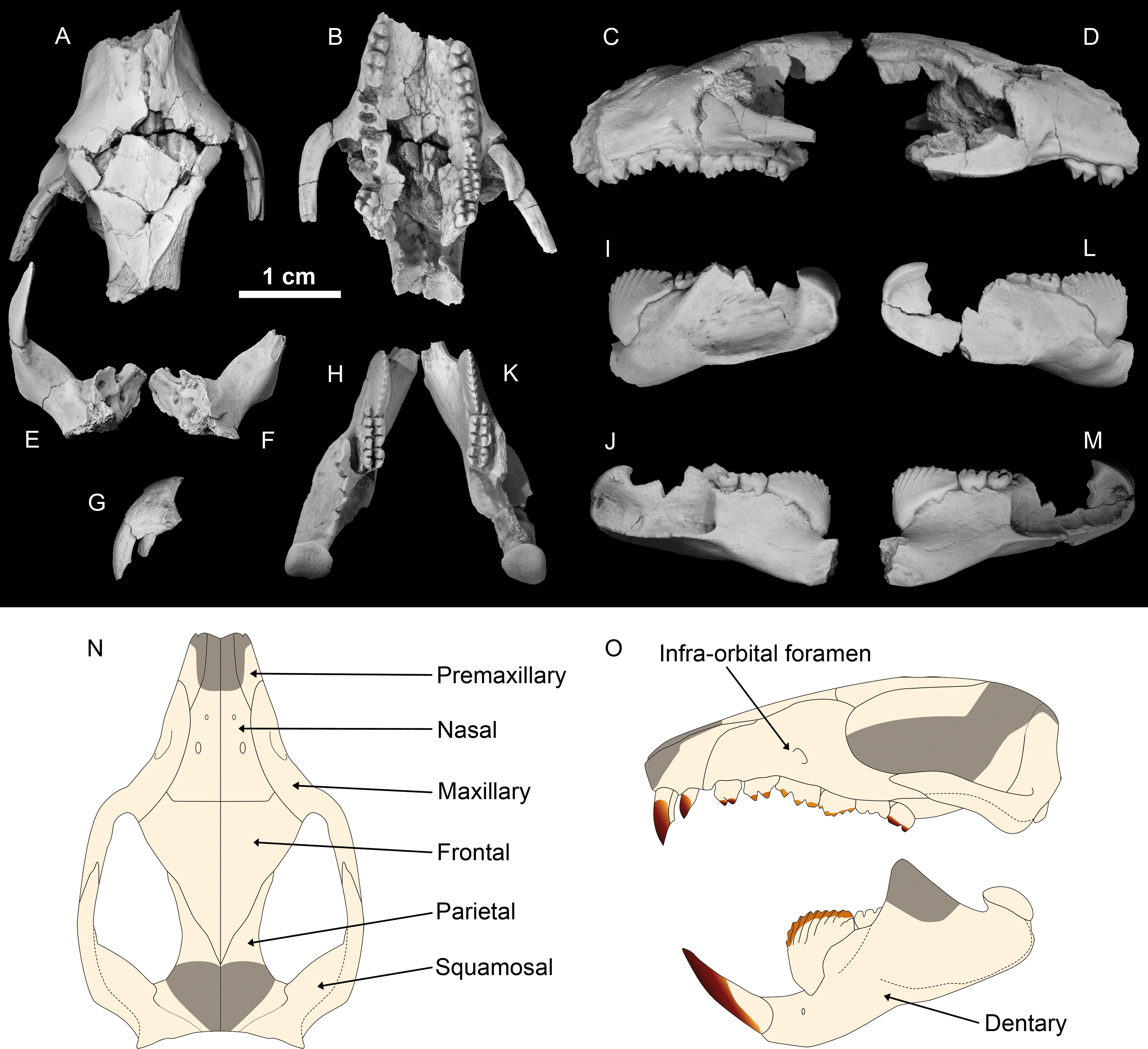
- Skull of Barbatodon transylvanicus

Scientific classification
- Kingdom: Animalia
- Phylum: Chordata
- Class: Mammalia
- Order: †Multituberculata
- Suborder: †Cimolodonta
- Family: †Kogaionidae; Râdulescu and Samson 1996

Genera
- Barbatodon; Hainina; Kogaionon; Litovoi

= Kogaionidae =

Kogaionidae Temporal range: Late Cretaceous-Eocene 66–55 Ma

Extinct family of mammals

Kogaionidae is a family of fossil mammals within the extinct order Multituberculata. Representatives are known from the Upper Cretaceous and the Paleocene of Europe. Having started as island endemics on Hațeg Island during the Upper Cretaceous, where they were in fact the dominant mammal group and diverged into rather unique ecological niches, they expanded across Europe in the Paleocene, where they briefly became a major component of its mammal fauna before their extinction. They are considered to be basal members of Cimolodonta.

== Classification ==
This family is part of the suborder Cimolodonta, generally accepted as closely related to Taeniolabidoidea.

These small multituberculates were named by Rădulescu R. and Samson P. in 1996, who stated they

"Share with Taeniolabidoidea the general shape of the skull, with anterior part of zygomatic arches directed roughly transversely and very short basicranial region, which gives the skull a square-like appearance, but differ from them in having a strongly elongated snout and different dentition," (Kielan-Jaworowska & Hurum 2001, p.418).

Recent studies have favoured a position close to Taeniolabidoidea. A 2021 study found them to be the amongst the most basal members of Cimolodonta, more derived only than Bryceomys, and they probably originated from an eobaatarid-like ancestor.

== Biology ==
Like some modern rodents and shrews, at least some kogaionids had red, iron-pigmented enamel. In Barbatodon this distribution is more similar to that seen in shrews as opposed to the condition seen in rodents, and suggests insectivore habits. This is a unique evolutionary route taken in the isolation of their island environment, almost entirely deprived of competing mammals, and inadvertently resulted in their survival across the KT event.

In Litovoi tholocephalos, there was an extreme brain size reduction, displaying one of the smallest brains in proportion to body size of any derived mammal. Additionally, it bore a small dome in its head, like a pachycephalosaur.

== Range ==
Kogaionids first appear as island endemics on Maastrichtian Romania, then isolated from the rest of Europe. They are in fact the only European multituberculates from the Late Cretaceous, in contrast to the Early Cretaceous' massive multituberculate diversity in Britain and the Iberian Peninsula. A supposed kogaionid is also known from the Campanian of Appalachia, but its identity as a kogaionid is ambiguous and rather unlikely considering the otherwise Hațeg Island-restricted range.

Perhaps due to their insectivorous habits, kogaionids managed to survive the KT event. During the Paleocene Hațeg Island connected to the rest of Europe, and so these multituberculates dispersed; fossils are known in France, Spain and Belgium, beside Romania's Paleocene deposits at Jisou. For a brief period of time these were among the most common mammals in Europe, but by the Late Paleocene the arrival of other multituberculate groups from North America brought a quick decline, culminating in its extinction at the PETM.
