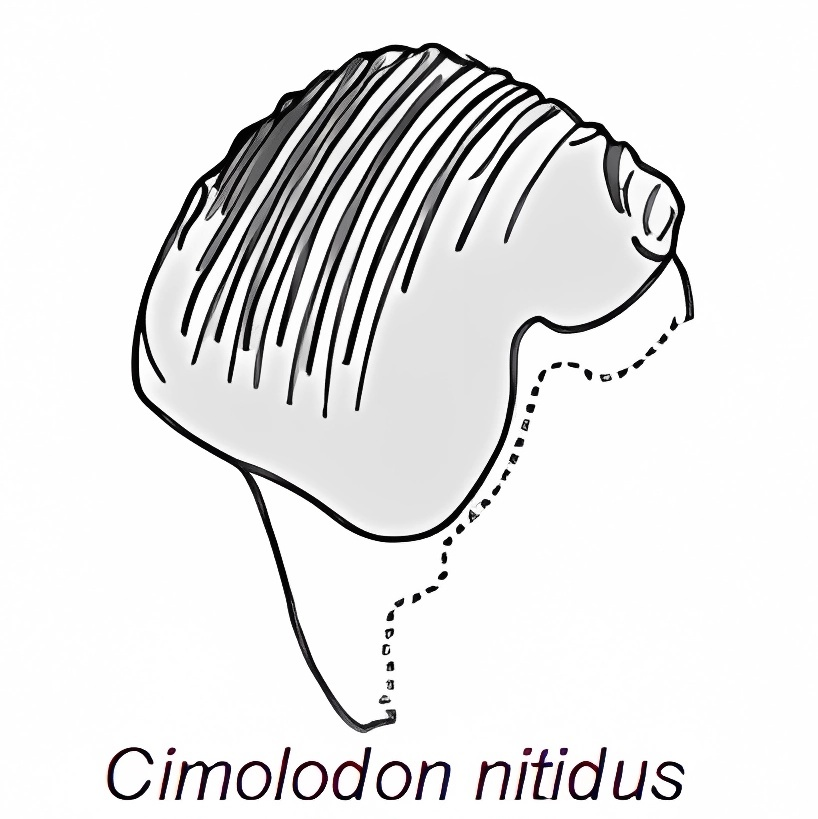
- Premolar of Cimolodon nitidus, view from the outside

Scientific classification
- Kingdom: Animalia
- Phylum: Chordata
- Class: Mammalia
- Order: †Multituberculata
- Family: †Cimolodontidae
- Genus: †Cimolodon; Marsh, 1889

Species
- C. akersteni Weaver et al., 2019; C. desosai Wilson Mantilla et al., 2026; C. electus Fox, 1971; C. nitidus Marsh, 1889 (type); C. parvus Marsh, 1892; C. peregrinus Donohue, Wilson & Breithaupt, 2013; C. similis Fox, 1971; C. wardi Eaton, 2006

= Cimolodon =

Cimolodon Temporal range: Late Cretaceous

Extinct mammal genus

Cimolodon is an extinct genus of cimolodontid mammal in the order Multituberculata. Specimens are known from the Late Cretaceous of North America.

== Taxonomy ==
The genus Cimolodon was named by Othniel Charles Marsh in 1889. Kielan-Jaworowska & Hurum (2001) noted that Cimolodon seems to be more closely related to members of their "Paracimexomys" group than to other ptilodontoideans.

=== Species ===
Cimolodon electus (Fox R.C. 1971) is known from the Upper Cretaceous of the Upper Milk River Formation in Alberta, Canada. Possible finds have been reported from New Mexico.

Cimolodon nitidus (Marsh O.C. 1889) is known from Late Cretaceous strata of the Lance Formation of Wyoming, Utah, Montana and South Dakota (United States) as well as Alberta and Saskatchewan (Canada). Synonyms include Allacodon lentus (Marsh, 1889); Allacodon rarus (Marsh, 1892); Cimolomys bellus (Marsh, 1889); Cimolomys digona (Marsh, 1899); Cimolomys nitidus; Halodon serratus (Marsh, 1889); Nanomyops minitus (Marsh, 1892); Nanomys minitus (Marsh, 1889); and Ptilodus serratus (Gidley, 1909).

Cimolodon parvus (Marsh O.C. 1892) is also known from the Upper Cretaceous Lance Formation of Wyoming. A specimen referred to as C. cf. nitidus has been recovered from the Prince Creek Formation.

Cimolodon similis (Fox R.C. 1971) is known from the Late Cretaceous (Santonian-early Campanian) of Alberta and Utah. C. wardi is known from the Wahweap Formation of Utah.

Cimolodon akersteni is known from the Cenomanian-age Wayan Formation of Idaho.

Cimolodon desosai is known from specimen IGM 14691, a partial skull and mandible, in addition to part of the ulna, femur, and vertebrae. These remains were found in the Campanian-aged El Gallo Formation (El Disecado Member) of Baja California, Mexico.
