= List of the Mesozoic life of Wyoming =

This list of the Mesozoic life of Wyoming contains the various prehistoric life-forms whose fossilized remains have been reported from within the US state of Wyoming and are between 252.17 and 66 million years of age.

== A ==
- †Abielites
  - †Abielites angusticarpus
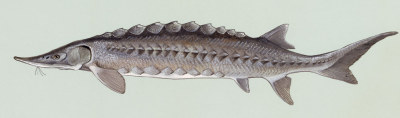
- Illustration of a living Acipenser sturgeon
  Acipenser
  - †Acipenser eruciferus
- †Acutostrea
  - †Acutostrea plumosa
- †Adocus
- †Agathaumas – type locality for genus
  - †Agathaumas sylvestris – type locality for species
- †Agerostrea
  - †Agerostrea mesenterica
- †Agialopous – type locality for genus
  - †Agialopous wyomingensis – type locality for species
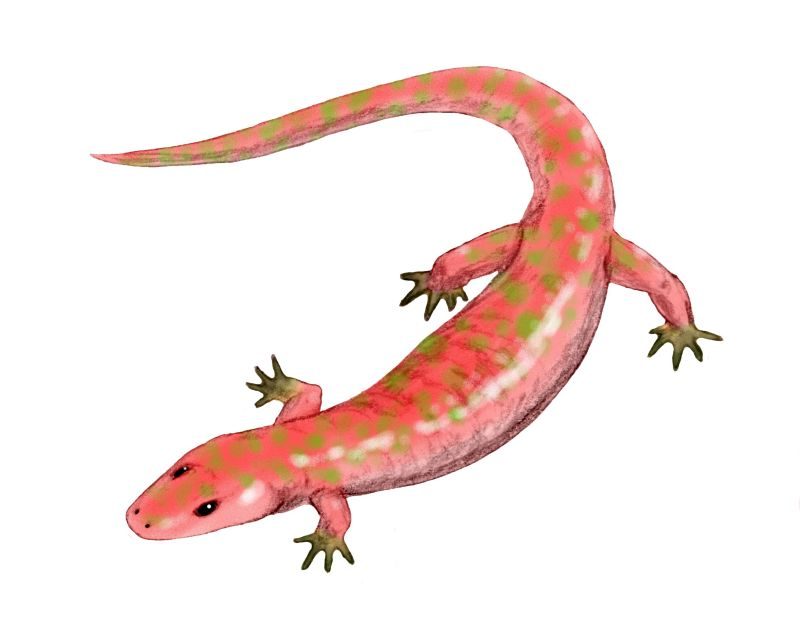
- Restoration of the Cretaceous-Pleistocene amphibian Albanerpeton
  †Albanerpeton
  - †Albanerpeton galaktion
  - †Albanerpeton nexuosus – type locality for species
- †Albertosaurus – or unidentified comparable form
- †Alethesaurus – type locality for genus
  - †Alethesaurus quadratus – type locality for species
- †Allacodon
  - †Allacodon lentus – type locality for species
  - †Allacodon pumilis – type locality for species
- †Allognathosuchus
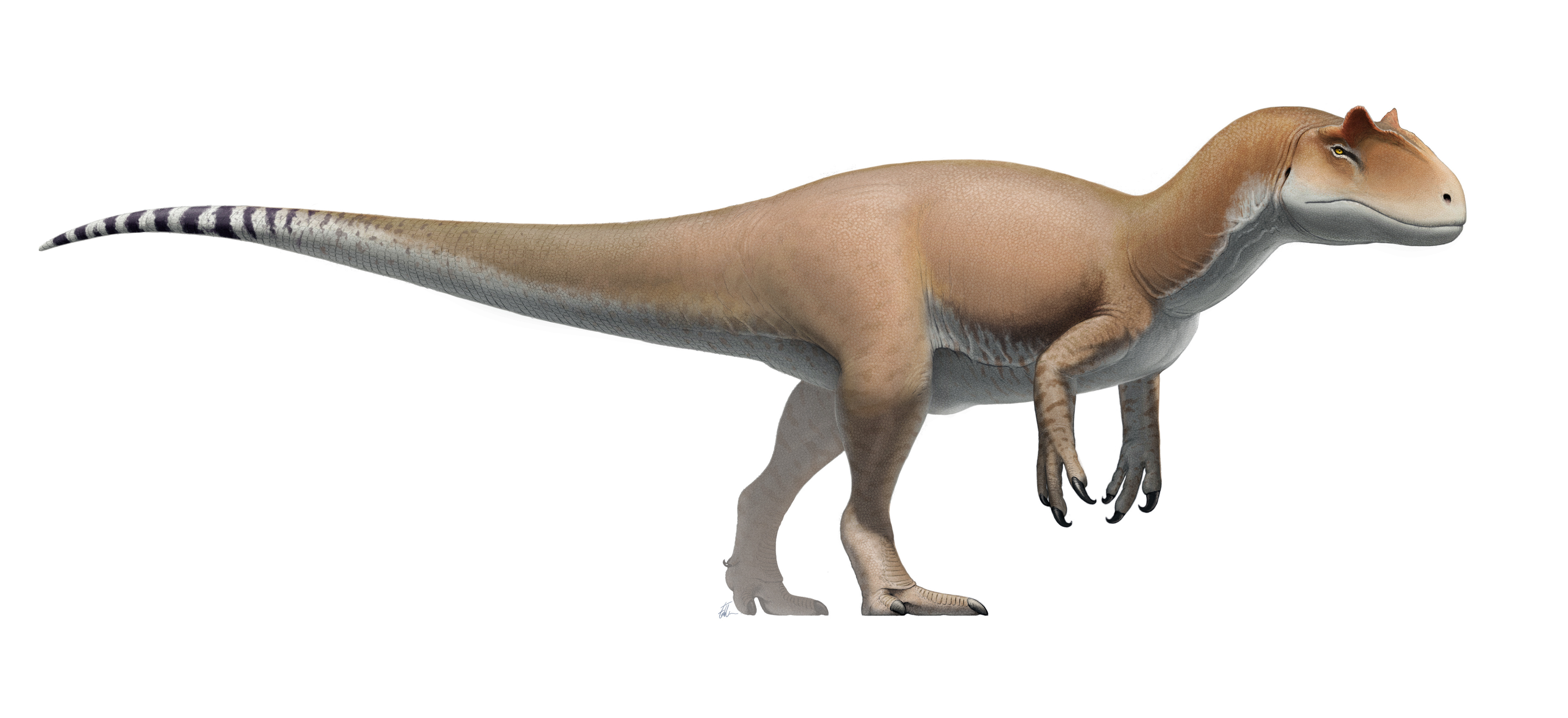
- Life restoration of the Late Jurassic theropod dinosaur Allosaurus
  †Allosaurus – type locality for genus
  - †Allosaurus fragilis – type locality for species
  - †Allosaurus jimmadseni
- †Alostera
  - †Alostera saskatchewanensis – type locality for species
- †Alphadon
  - †Alphadon attaragos – type locality for species
  - †Alphadon halleyi
  - †Alphadon marshi
  - †Alphadon sahnii
- †Altacreodus
  - †Altacreodus magnus
- †Alzadites
  - †Alzadites westonensis – type locality for species
- †Amblotherium – type locality for genus
  - †Amblotherium gracilis – type locality for species
- †Amborellites – type locality for genus
  - †Amborellites wyomingensis – type locality for species
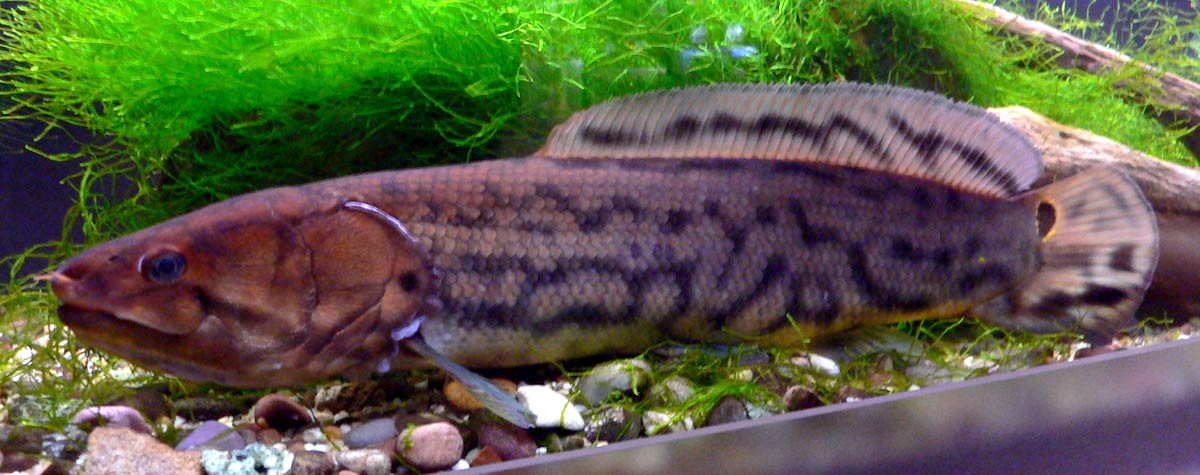
- A living Amia, or bowfin
  Amia
  - †Amia fragosa
  - †Amia uintaensis
- †Amphicoelias
  - †Amphicoelias brontodiplodocus – type locality for species
- †Amphidon – type locality for genus
  - †Amphidon superstes – type locality for species
- †Anaklinoceras
  - †Anaklinoceras mortoni
- †Anaschisma – type locality for genus
  - †Anaschisma brachygnatha – type locality for species
  - †Anaschisma browni – type locality for species
- †Anceptophyllum – type locality for genus
  - †Anceptophyllum pulcrum – type locality for species
- †Anchura – tentative report
- †Ancorichnus
- †Andromeda
  - †Andromeda grayana
- †Anemia
  - †Anemia fremonti
  - †Anemia subcretacea
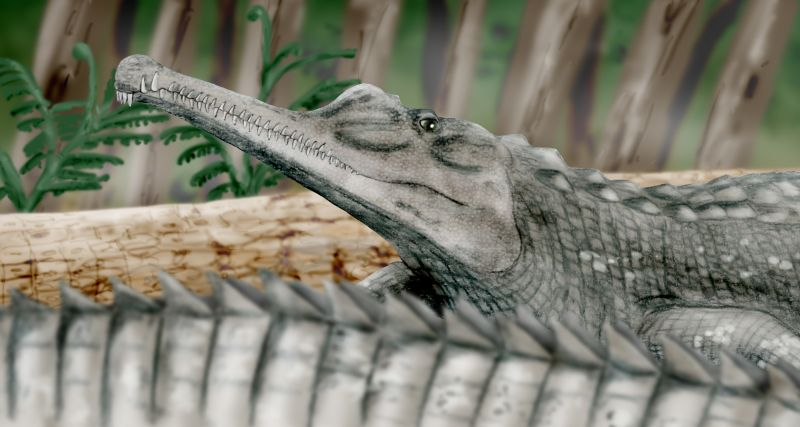
- Restoration of the Late Triassic phytosaur Angistorhinus
  †Angistorhinus – type locality for genus
  - †Angistorhinus aeolamnis – type locality for species
  - †Angistorhinus gracilis – type locality for species
  - †Angistorhinus grandis – type locality for species
  - †Angistorhinus maximus – type locality for species
- †Anisoceras
- †Anisomyon
  - †Anisomyon borealis
  - †Anisomyon centrale
  - †Anisomyon patelliformis
  - †Anisomyon subovatus – or unidentified related form
  - †Anisomyon subovulatus
- †Ankistrorhynchus
  - †Ankistrorhynchus washakiensis – type locality for species
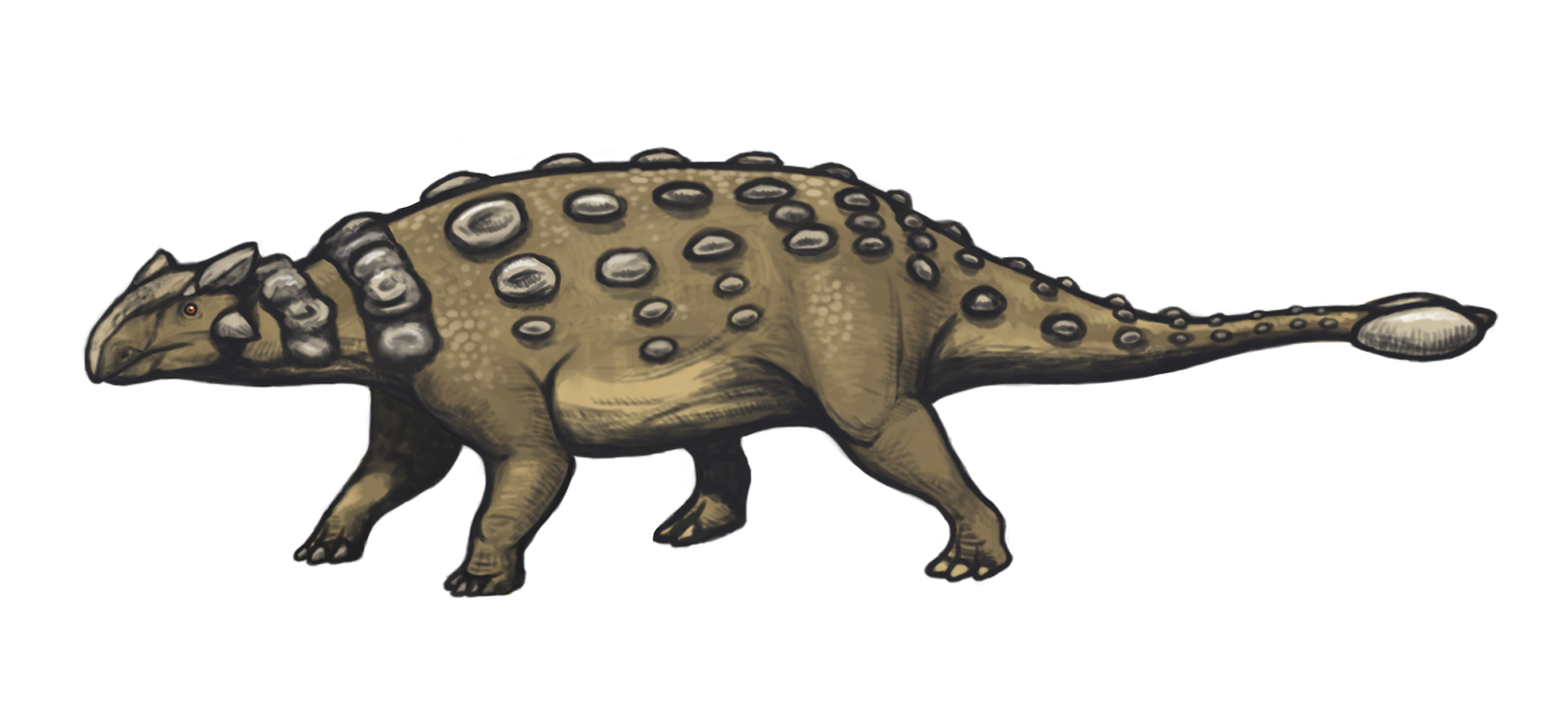
- Life restoration of the Late Cretaceous armored dinosaur Ankylosaurus
  †Ankylosaurus
  - †Ankylosaurus magniventris
- †Anomalofusus – tentative report
- Anomia
  - †Anomia tellinoides
- Anona
  - †Anona robusta – tentative report
- †Anthrotaxopsis
  - †Anthrotaxopsis tenuicaulis
- Antrimpos
- †Apatodonosaurus
  - †Apatodonosaurus grayi
- †Apatosaurinae
  - †Apatosaurinae – type locality for genus – informal
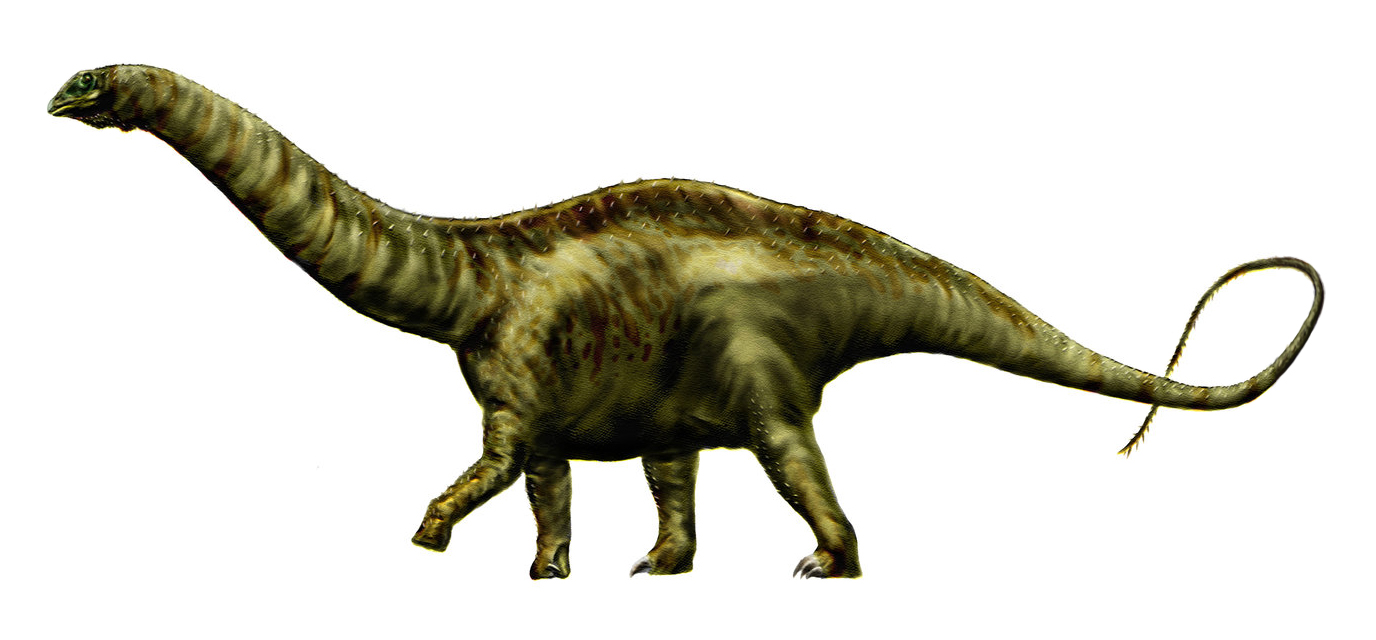
- Life restoration of the Late Jurassic sauropod dinosaur Apatosaurus
  †Apatosaurus
  - †Apatosaurus louisae
  - †Apatosaurus minimus
- †Apeibopsis – tentative report
  - †Apeibopsis discolor
- †Aploconodon – type locality for genus
  - †Aploconodon comoensis – type locality for species
- Aporrhais
  - †Aporrhais biangulata
- †Aquilina – type locality for genus
  - †Aquilina grossidentata – type locality for species
- Aralia
  - †Aralia veatchii
- †Araliaephyllum
  - †Araliaephyllum artocarpoides
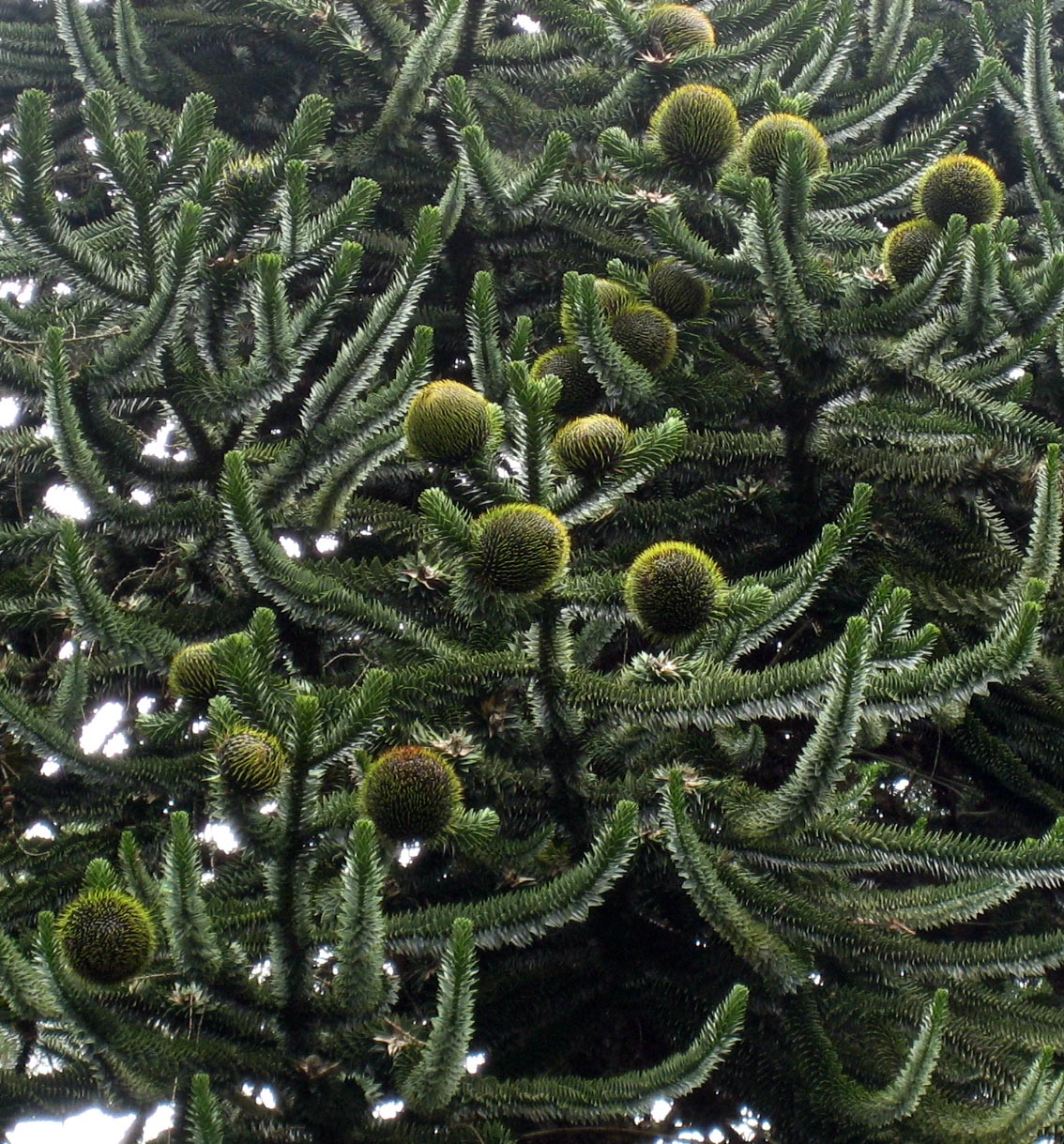
- Foliage and cones of a living Araucaria tree
  Araucaria
- †Araucarites
  - †Araucarites cuneatus – type locality for species
  - †Araucarites longifolia
  - †Araucarites wyomingensis – type locality for species
- Arca – report made of unidentified related form or using admittedly obsolete nomenclature
- †Arcellites
  - †Arcellites disciformis
- †Archaeotriakis
  - †Archaeotriakis ornatus – type locality for species
  - †Archaeotriakis rochelleae
- †Archaeotrigon – type locality for genus
  - †Archaeotrigon brevimaxillus – type locality for species
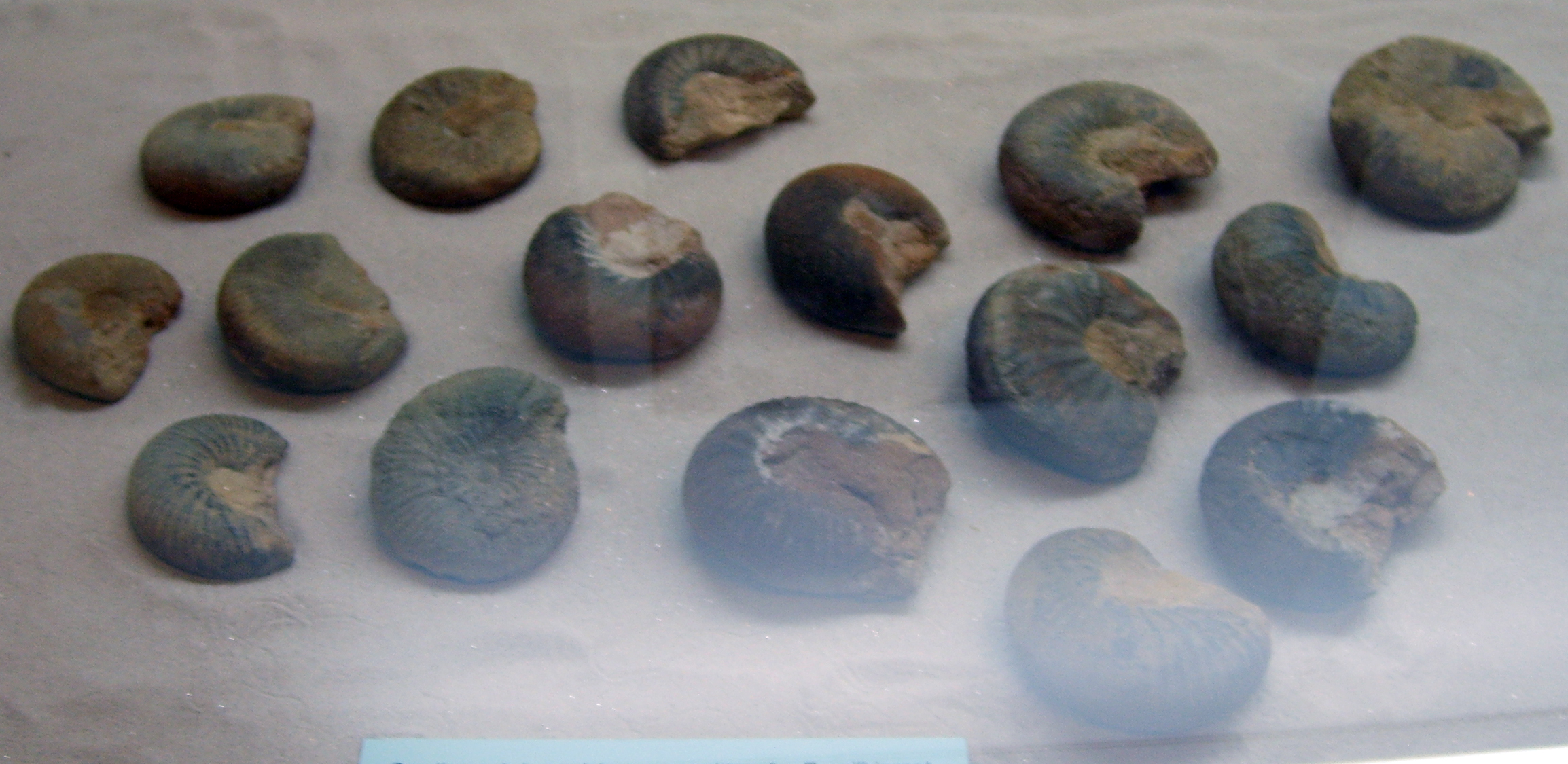
- Fossilized shells of the Middle Jurassic ammonoid cephalopod Arcticoceras
  †Arcticoceras
- †Arenicolites
- †Aristolochites
  - †Aristolochites brittoni
- †Ascarinites – type locality for genus
  - †Ascarinites communis – type locality for species
- Aspideretes
- †Aspideretoides
  - †Aspideretoides foveatus – or unidentified comparable form
- †Asplenites
  - †Asplenites tenellum
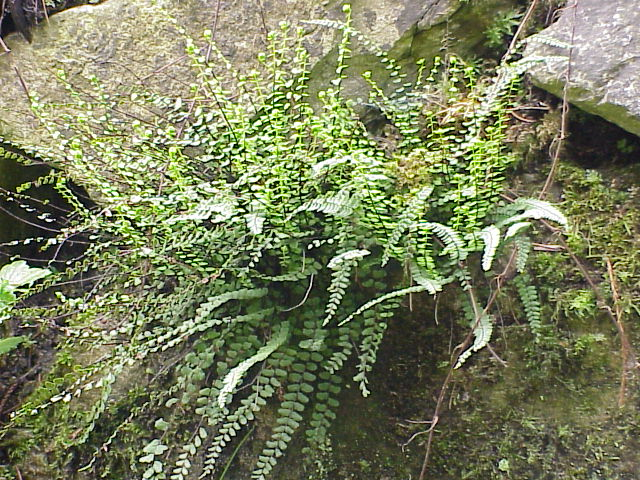
- A living Asplenium, or spleenwort
  †Asplenium
  - †Asplenium haguei
  - †Asplenium neomexicanum
  - †Asplenium occidentale
- †Astandes
  - †Astandes densatus
- †Astarta
  - †Astarta packardi
- Astarte
  - †Astarte gregaria
  - †Astarte livingstonensis
  - †Astarte meeki
  - †Astarte morion
- †Athrotaxopsis
  - †Athrotaxopsis tenuicaulis
- † Atira – tentative report
  - †Atira nebrascensis
- †Atokatheridium – or unidentified comparable form
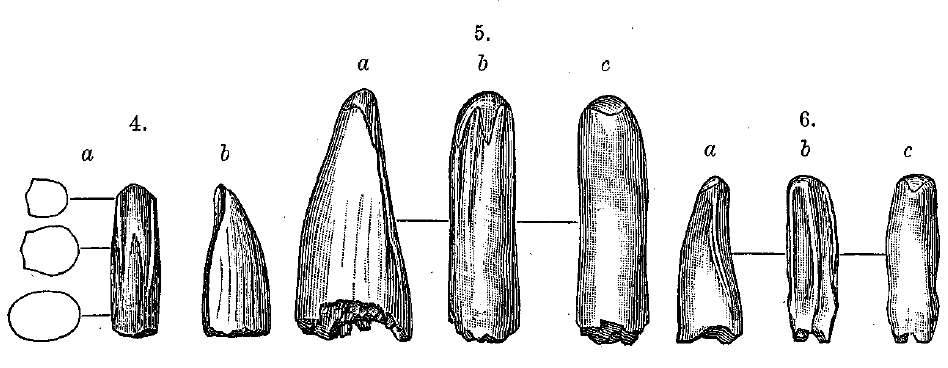
- Illustration of fossilized teeth from the Late Cretaceous tyrannosaur Aublysodon
  †Aublysodon
  - †Aublysodon mirandus
- †Austrotindaria
  - †Austrotindaria antiqua
  - †Austrotindaria canalensis
  - †Austrotindaria svalbardensis
- †Avernalia – type locality for genus
  - †Avernalia solida – type locality for species

== B ==
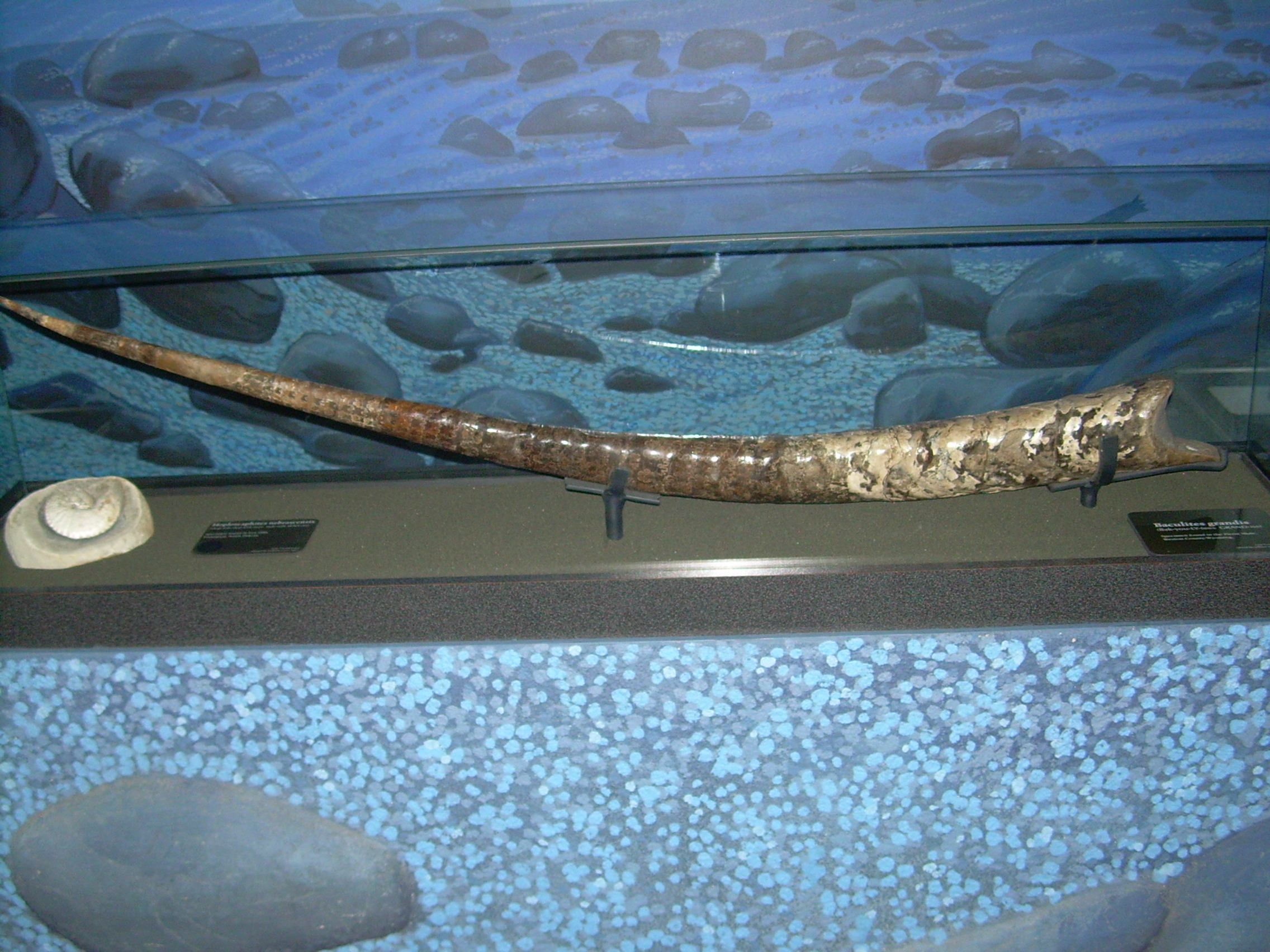
- Fossilized shell of the Late Cretaceous ammonoid cephalopod Baculites
  †Baculites
  - †Baculites asper
  - †Baculites asperiformis
  - †Baculites baculus
  - †Baculites clinolobatus
  - †Baculites cobbani
  - †Baculites codyensis
  - †Baculites crickmayi
  - †Baculites elaisi
  - †Baculites eliasi
  - †Baculites gilberti
  - †Baculites grandis
  - †Baculites gregoryensis
  - †Baculites haresi
  - †Baculites jenseni – or unidentified comparable form
  - †Baculites mariasensis
  - †Baculites mclearni
  - †Baculites obtusus
  - †Baculites perplexus
  - †Baculites reesidei
  - †Baculites rugosus
  - †Baculites scotti
- †Baena
  - †Baena hatcheri – type locality for species
  - †Baena hayi – type locality for species
  - †Baena marshi – type locality for species
- †Baieropsis
  - †Baieropsis adiantifolia
  - †Baieropsis pluripartita
- †Baptanodon
  - †Baptanodon discus
  - †Baptanodon reedi – type locality for species
  - †Baptanodon robustus – type locality for species
- Barbatia – tentative report
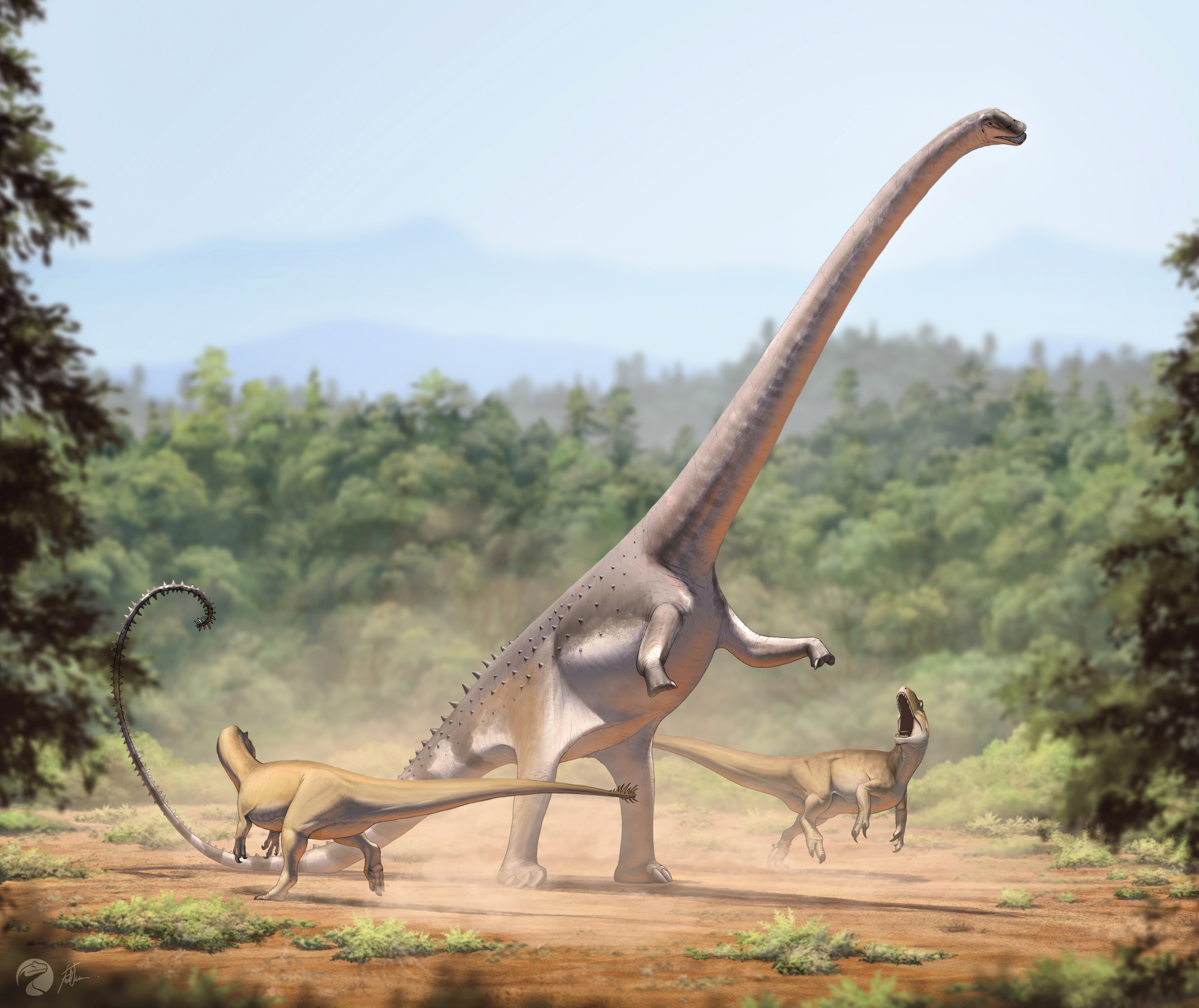
- Restoration of the Late Jurassic sauropod dinosaur Barosaurus rearing to defend itself against a pair of the theropod Allosaurus
  †Barosaurus
  - †Barosaurus lentus
- †Basilemys
  - †Basilemys sinuosa
- †Batodon
  - †Batodon tenuis – type locality for species
- †Belonostomus
  - †Belonostomus longirostris
- Berenicea
- Bombur
- †Borealosuchus
  - †Borealosuchus sternbergii – type locality for species
- †Boremys
- †Borissiakoceras
  - †Borissiakoceras orbiculatum
- Botula
  - †Botula ripleyana
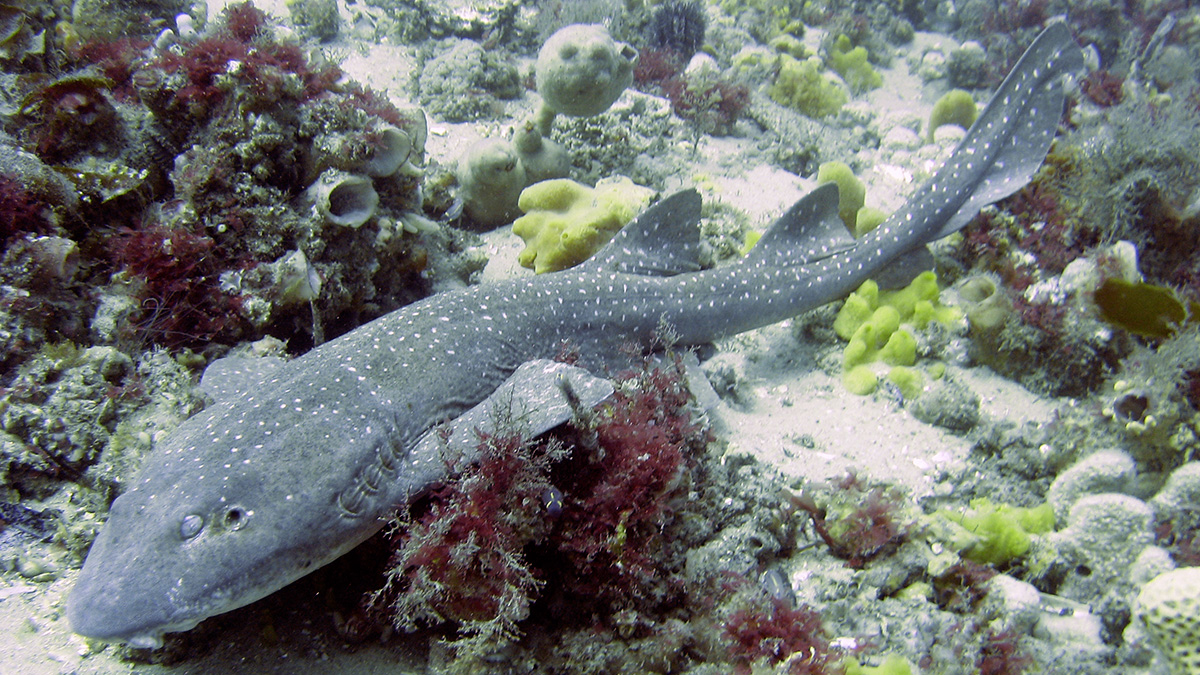
- A living Brachaelurus, or blind shark
  Brachaelurus
  - †Brachaelurus bighornensis – type locality for species
- †Brachiosaurus
- †Brachybrachium – type locality for genus
  - †Brachybrachium brevipes – type locality for species
- †Brachychampsa
  - †Brachychampsa montana
- †Brachyphyllum
  - †Brachyphyllum crassum
- †Brontopodus – or unidentified comparable form
  - †Brontopodus birdi
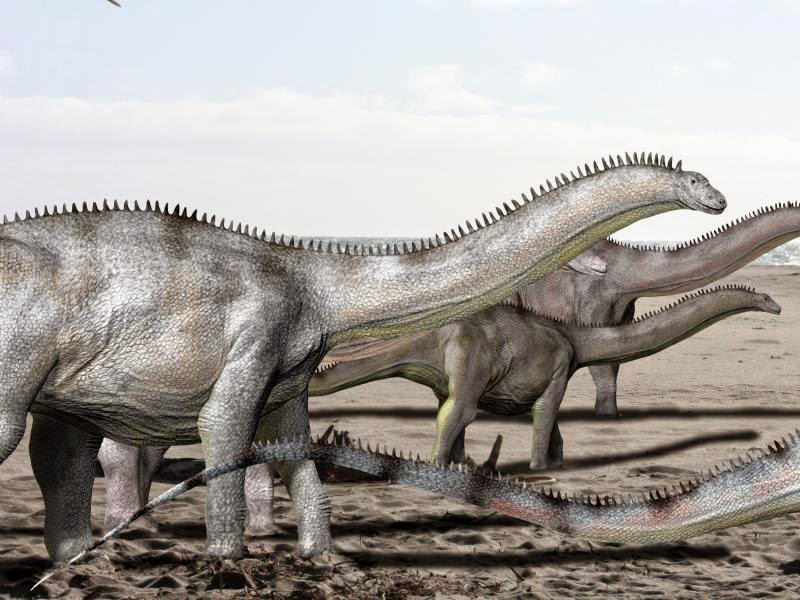
- Life restoration of a herd of the Late Jurassic sauropod dinosaur Brontosaurus
  †Brontosaurus – type locality for genus
  - †Brontosaurus excelsus – type locality for species
  - †Brontosaurus parvus – type locality for species
  - †Brontosaurus yahnahpin – type locality for species
- †Bryceomys
- †Bullopsis
  - †Bullopsis cretacea – or unidentified related form

== C ==
- †Cadoceras
- Callista
  - †Callista deweyi
  - †Callista peplucida
- †Calycoceras
  - †Calycoceras canitaurinum
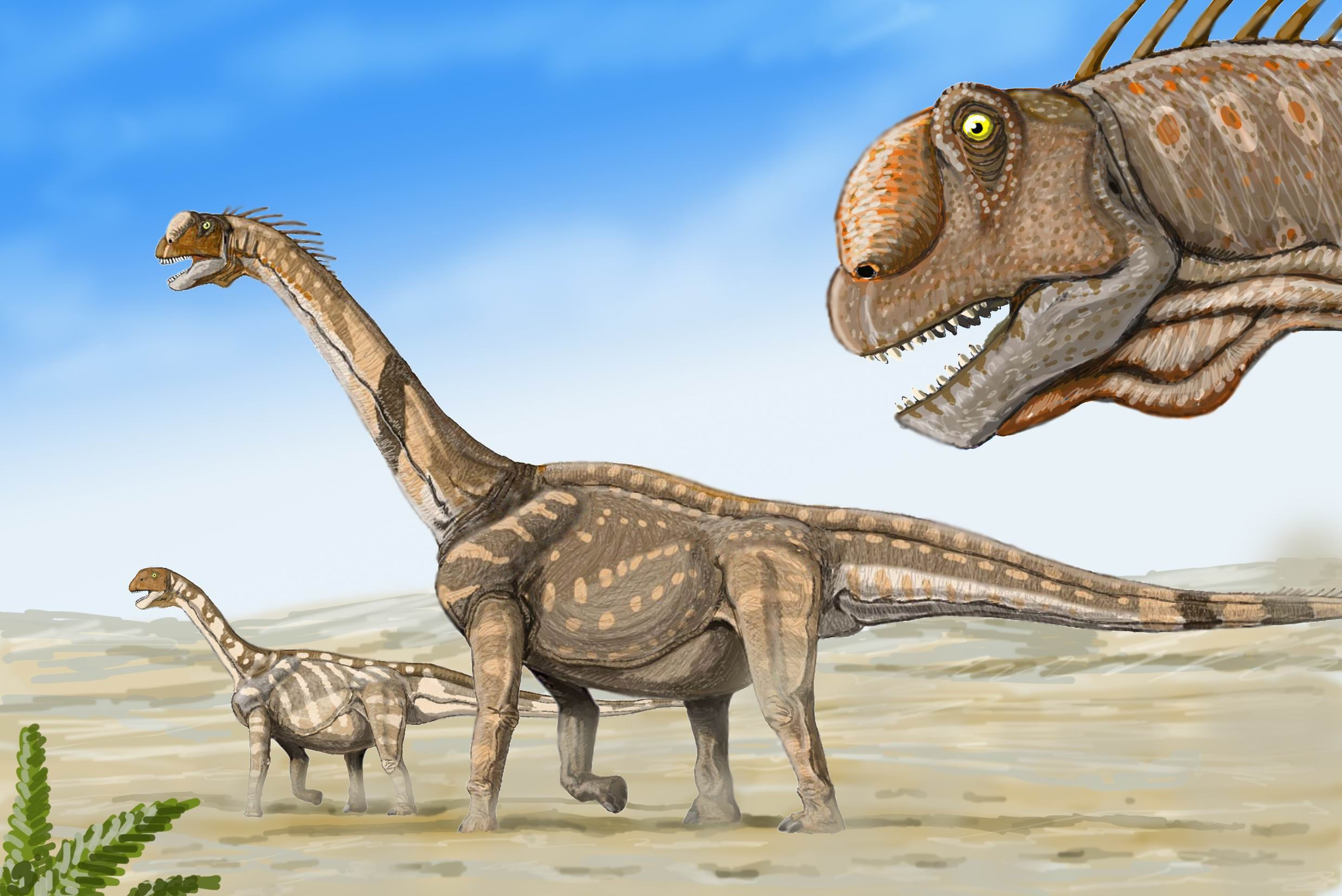
- Life restoration of a herd of the Late Jurassic sauropod dinosaur Camarasaurus
  †Camarasaurus – type locality for genus
  - †Camarasaurus grandis – type locality for species
  - †Camarasaurus lentus – type locality for species
- †Camborygma
- Campeloma
- †Camptomus
  - †Camptomus amplus – type locality for species
- †Camptonectes
  - †Camptonectes bellistriatus
  - †Camptonectes distans – or unidentified comparable form
  - †Camptonectes platessiformis
  - †Camptonectes stygius
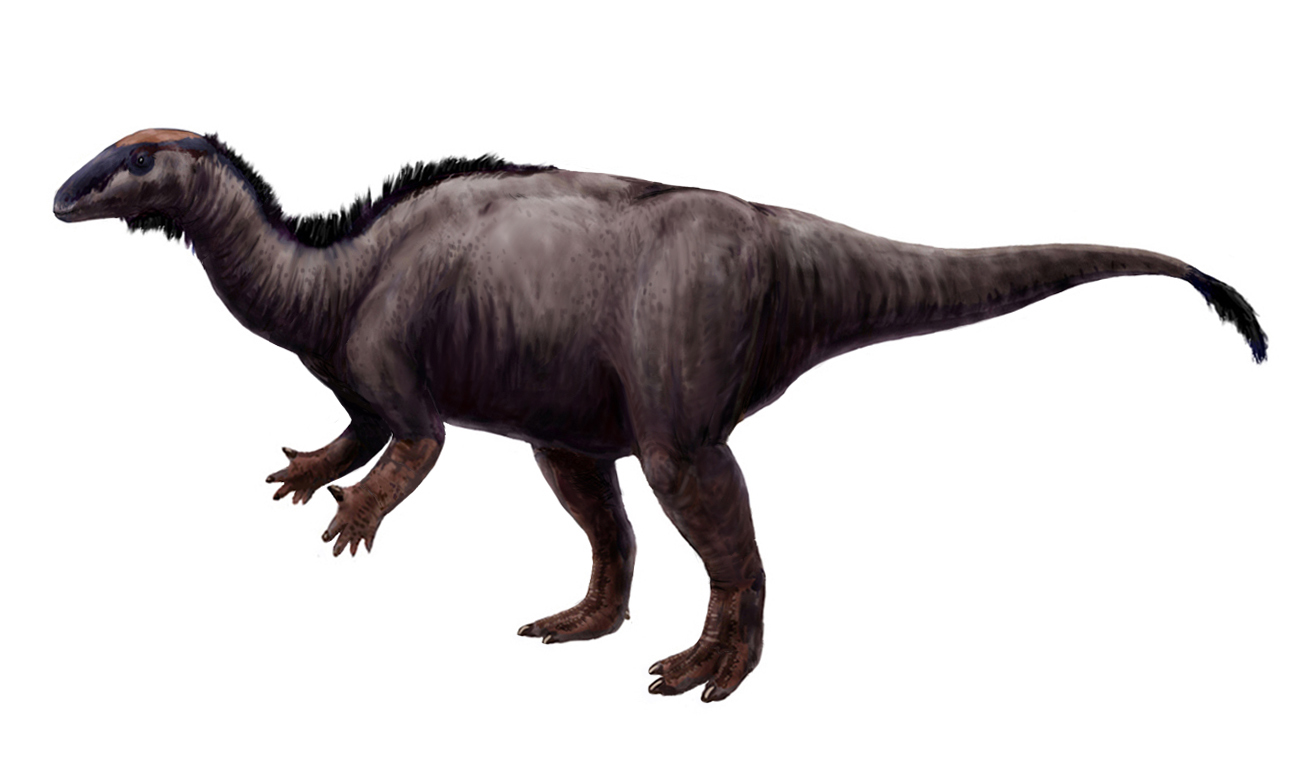
- Life restoration of the Late Jurassic ornithopod dinosaur Camptosaurus
  †Camptosaurus
  - †Camptosaurus dispar – type locality for species
- † Canna
  - †Canna magnifolia – tentative report
- †Capillirhynchia
  - †Capillirhynchia gallatinensis – type locality for species
- Cardium sp.
- †Carpites
  - †Carpites lancensis
  - †Carpites verrucosus
  - †Carpites walcotti
- †Carpolithus
  - †Carpolithus barrensis – type locality for species
  - †Carpolithus fasciculatus
  - †Carpolithus foenarius – type locality for species
  - †Carpolithus montiumnigrorum – type locality for species
  - †Carpolithus virginiensis
- †Carthaginites
  - †Carthaginites aquilonius – type locality for species
- †Cataceramus
  - †Cataceramus tenuilineatus
- †Cedrobaena
  - †Cedrobaena brinkman
- †Celastrophyllum
  - †Celastrophyllum gyminaefolium
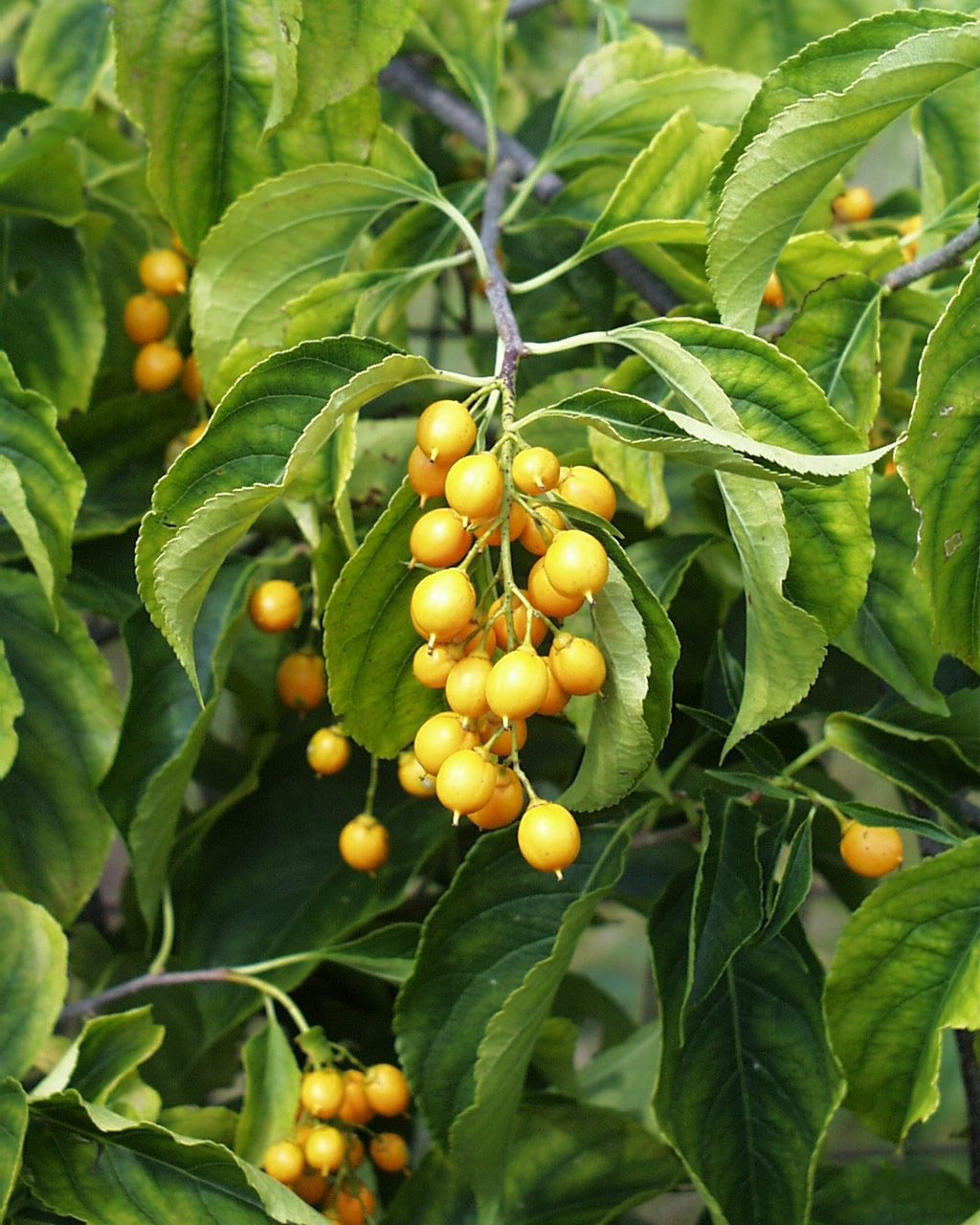
- Foliage and fruit of a living Celastrus, or staff vine
  †Celastrus – tentative report
  - †Celastrus taurinensis
- †Cemeterius – type locality for genus
  - †Cemeterius monstrosus – type locality for species
- †Centrophoroides
  - †Centrophoroides worlandensis – type locality for species
- †Cephalotaxopsis
  - †Cephalotaxopsis magnifolia
- †Ceramornis – type locality for genus
  - †Ceramornis major – type locality for species
- †Ceratodus
  - †Ceratodus frazieri
  - †Ceratodus guentheri
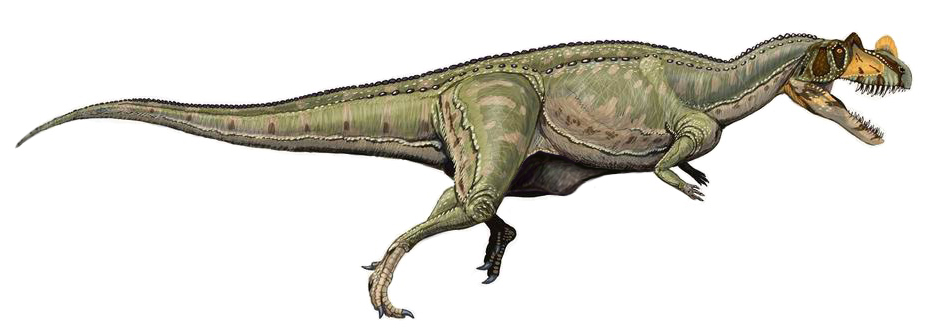
- Restoration of the Late Jurassic ceratosaur Ceratosaurus
  †Ceratosaurus
- Cercidiphyllum
  - †Cercidiphyllum arcticum
  - †Cercidiphyllum ellipticum
- †Cercomya
  - †Cercomya punctata
- †Ceritella
- Cerithium – tentative report
- †Chamops – type locality for genus
  - †Chamops segnis – type locality for species
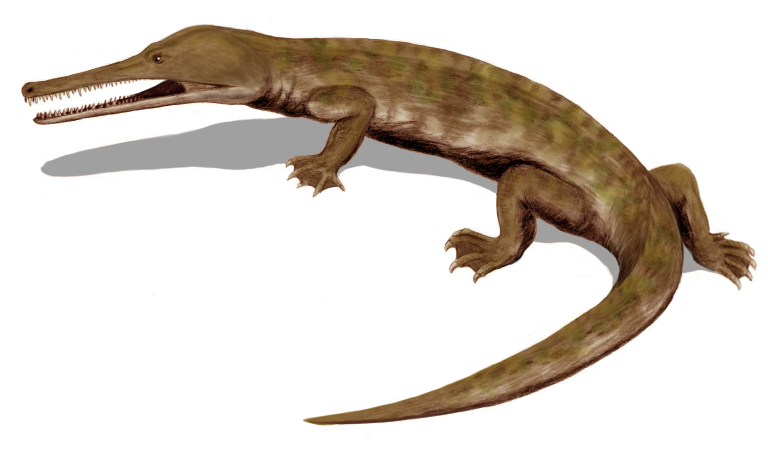
- Life restoration of the Late Cretaceous-Eocene choristoderan reptile Champsosaurus
  †Champsosaurus
  - †Champsosaurus natator
- †Chelonipus – or unidentified comparable form
- Chiloscyllium
  - †Chiloscyllium missouriense
- †Chirotherium
  - †Chirotherium barthii
- Chlamys
  - †Chlamys nebrascensis
- †Chondroceras
- †Cimexomys
  - †Cimexomys minor
- †Cimolestes
  - †Cimolestes incisus – type locality for species
  - †Cimolestes stirtoni – type locality for species
- †Cimolodon
  - †Cimolodon nitidus – type locality for species
  - †Cimolodon peregrinus – type locality for species
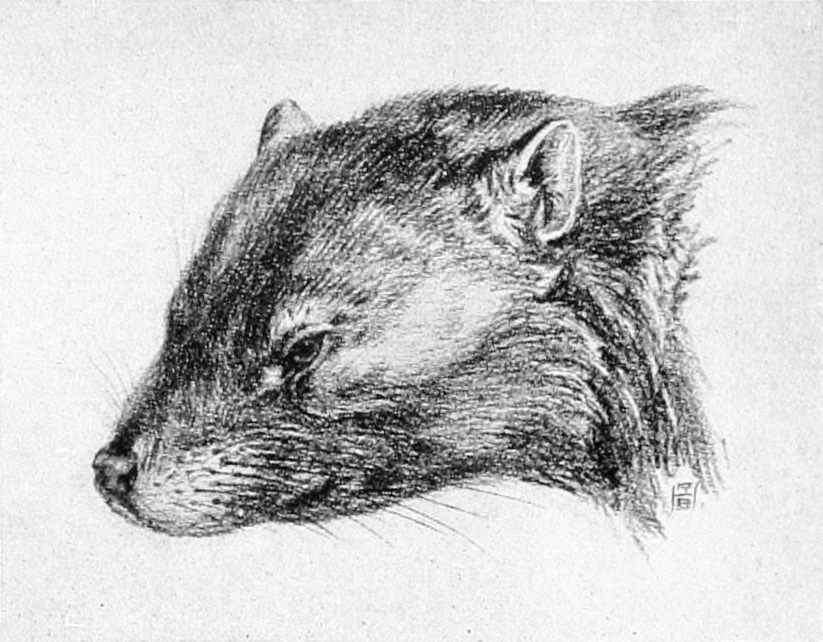
- Life restoration of the face of the Late Cretaceous multituberculate mammal Cimolomys
  †Cimolomys
  - †Cimolomys clarki
  - †Cimolomys gracilis – type locality for species
  - †Cimolomys parvus – type locality for species
- †Cimolopteryx
  - †Cimolopteryx maxima – type locality for species
  - †Cimolopteryx rara
- Cinnamomum
  - †Cinnamomum hesperium
- †Cissitis
  - †Cissitis rocklandensis
- Cissus
  - †Cissus lobato-crenata – tentative report
- †Cladoceramus
  - †Cladoceramus undulatoplicatus – or unidentified related form
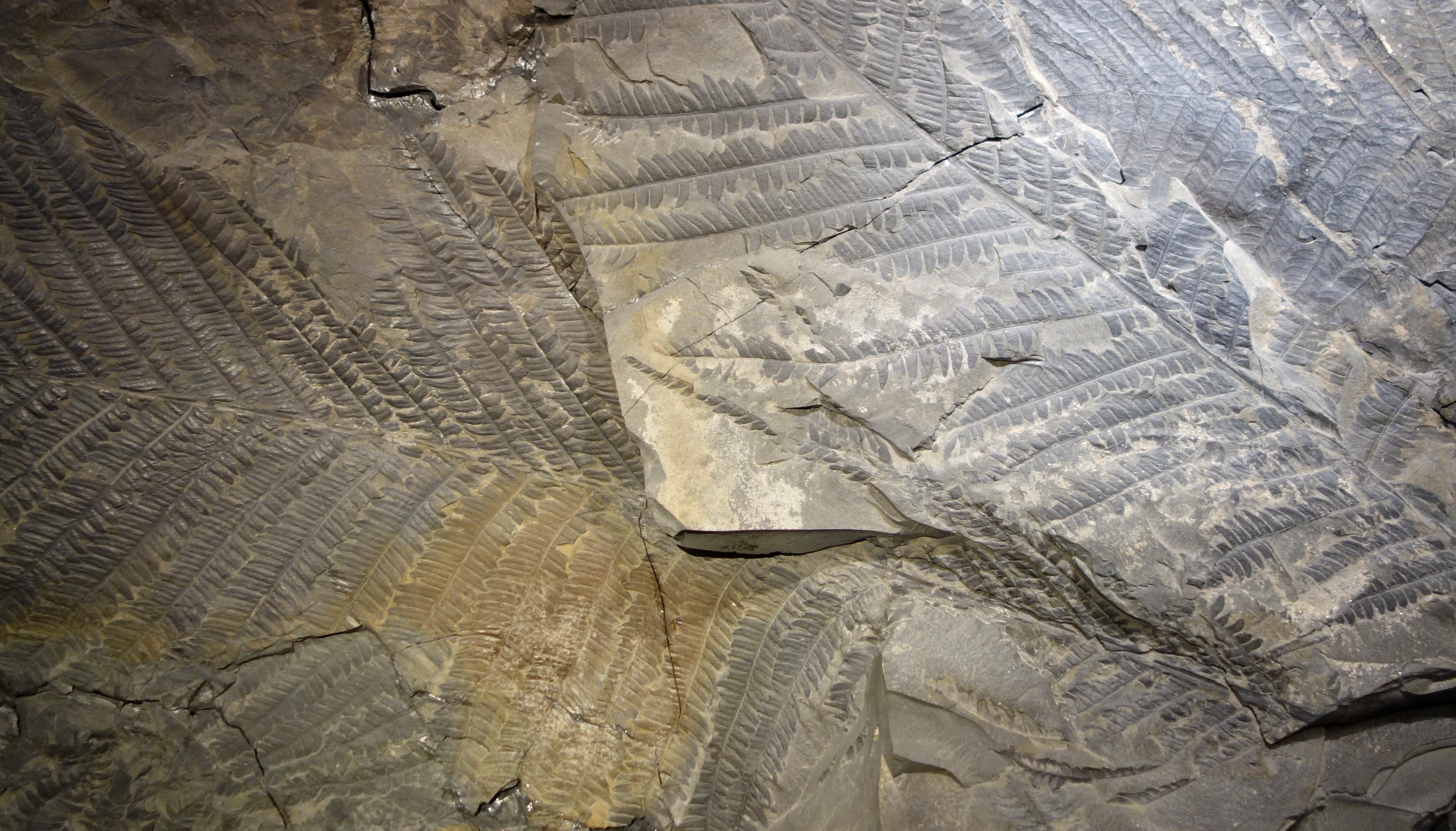
- Fossilized foliage of the Permian-Late Cretaceous fern Cladophlebis
  Cladophlebis
  - †Cladophlebis parva
  - †Cladophlebis readi – type locality for species
  - †Cladophlebis readii
  - †Cladophlebis wyomingensis – type locality for species
- †Claraia
  - †Claraia clarai
  - †Claraia mulleri
  - †Claraia stachei
- †Clemensodon – type locality for genus
  - †Clemensodon megaloba – type locality for species
- †Clioscaphites
  - †Clioscaphites saxitonianus
  - †Clioscaphites vermiformis
- †Coahuilites
  - †Coahuilites sheltoni
- †Coelostylina
- †Coelosuchus – type locality for genus
  - †Coelosuchus reedii – type locality for species
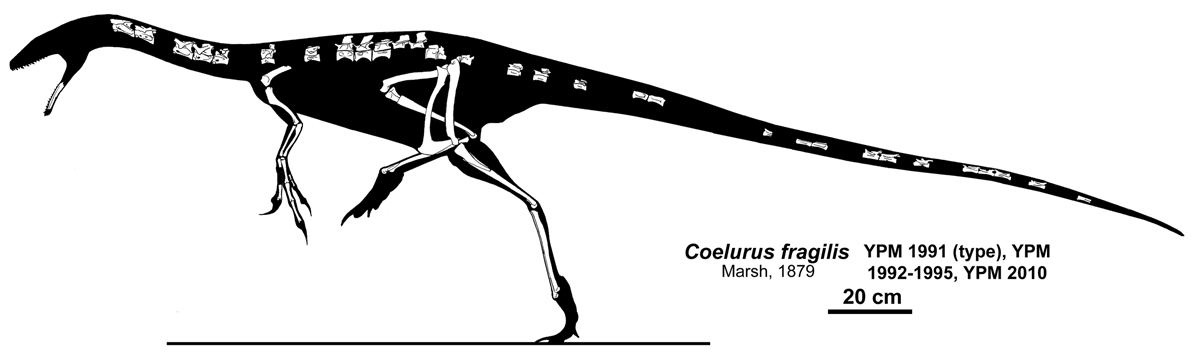
- Diagram illustrating the known fossil material of the Late Jurassic theropod dinosaur Coelurus
  †Coelurus – type locality for genus
  - †Coelurus fragilis – type locality for species
- †Collignoniceras
  - †Collignoniceras woollgari
- †Colpodontosaurus – type locality for genus
  - †Colpodontosaurus cracens – type locality for species
- †Comobatrachus – type locality for genus
  - †Comobatrachus aenigmaticus – type locality for species
- †Comodactylus – type locality for genus
  - †Comodactylus ostromi – type locality for species
- †Comodon – type locality for genus
  - †Comodon gidleyi – type locality for species
- †Comonecturoides – type locality for genus
  - †Comonecturoides marshi – type locality for species
- †Comotherium – type locality for genus
  - †Comotherium richi – type locality for species
- †Compsemys
  - †Compsemys victa
- †Confusionella
  - †Confusionella loczyi – type locality for species
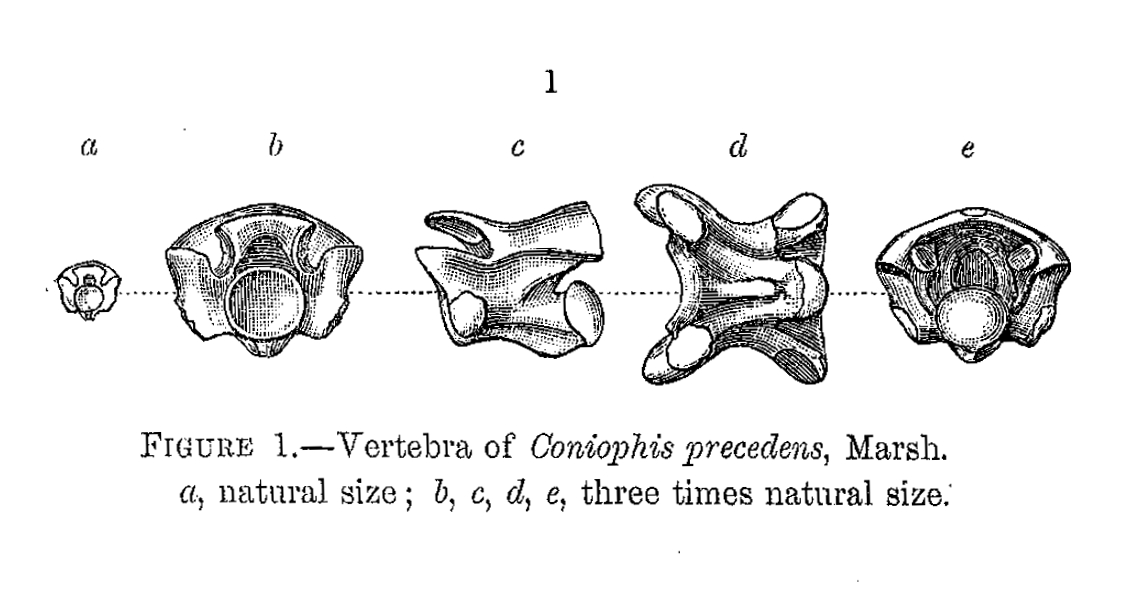
- Illustration of fossilized vertebrae of the Late Cretaceous-Eocene snake Coniophis. Othniel Charles Marsh (1892).
  †Coniophis – type locality for genus
  - †Coniophis precedens – type locality for species
- †Coniopteris – tentative report
- †Contogenys – or unidentified comparable form
- †Corax
- †Corbicella – tentative report
- Corbula
  - †Corbula crassimarginata
  - †Corbula kanabensis
  - †Corbula munda
- †Coriops
  - †Coriops amnicolus
- †Cornophyllum
  - †Cornophyllum wardii
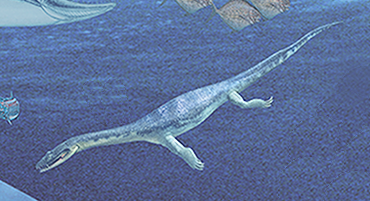
- Life restoration of the Early Triassic plesiosaur relative Corosaurus
  †Corosaurus
  - †Corosaurus alcovensis
- Cossmannea
- Crassatella
  - †Crassatella evansi
- †Crassidenticulum
  - †Crassidenticulum aquilae – type locality for species
  - †Crassidenticulum decurrens
- Crenella
- †Cretorectolobus
  - †Cretorectolobus olsoni
- †Cryptometoicoceras – type locality for genus
  - †Cryptometoicoceras mite – type locality for species
- †Cryptorhytis
  - †Cryptorhytis cheyennensis
- †Ctenacodon – type locality for genus
  - †Ctenacodon laticeps – type locality for species
  - †Ctenacodon scindens – type locality for species
  - †Ctenacodon serratus – type locality for species
- †Cteniogenys – type locality for genus
  - †Cteniogenys antiquus – type locality for species
- †Ctenostreon
  - †Ctenostreon gikshanensis – or unidentified comparable form
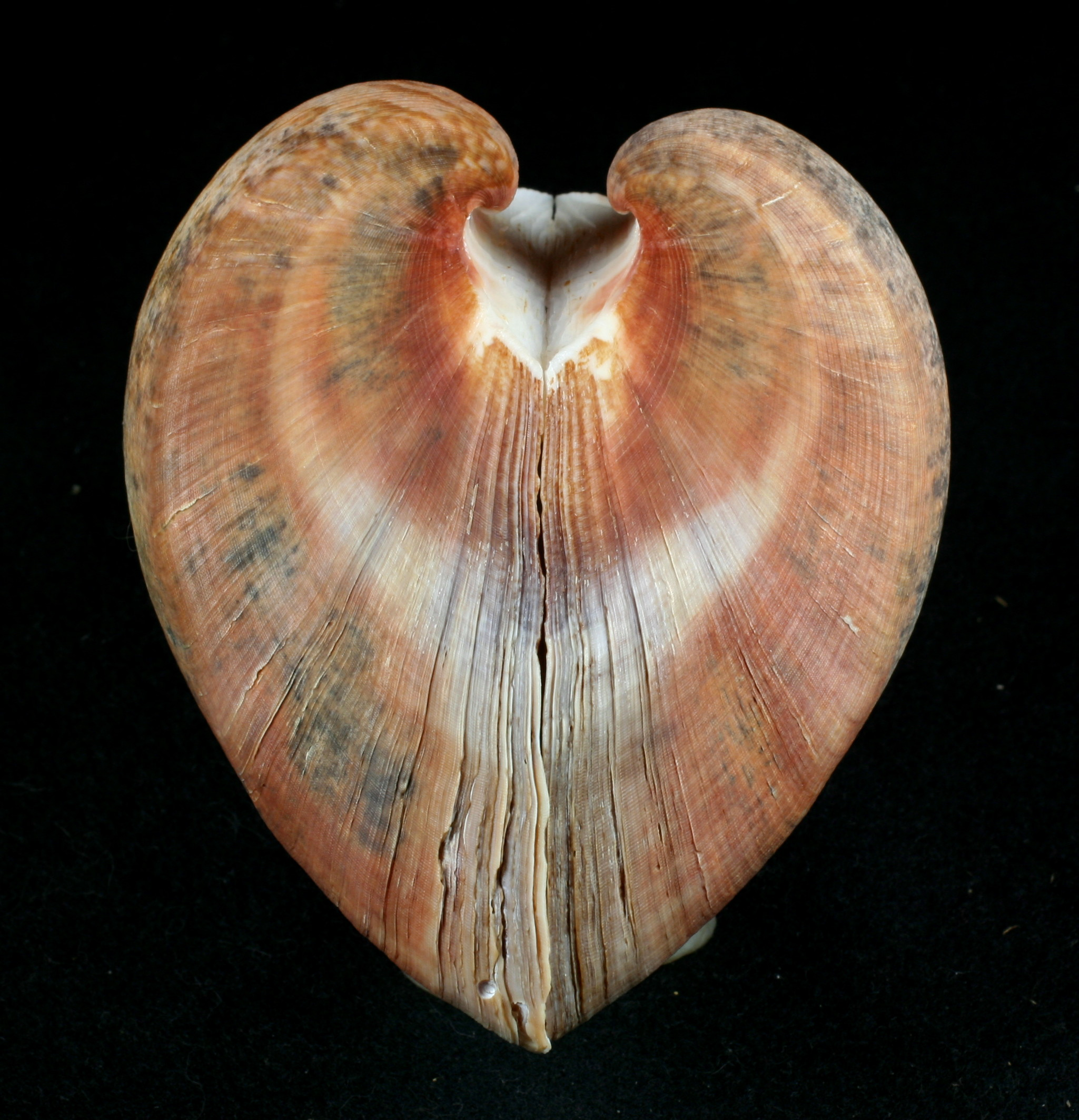
- Shell of a Cucullaea, or false ark shell
  Cucullaea
  - †Cucullaea haguei
  - †Cucullaea shumardi
- †Cunningtoniceras
- Cuspidaria
  - †Cuspidaria variablis
- †Cycadeospermum
  - †Cycadeospermum rotundatum
- †Cyclurus
  - †Cyclurus fragosus
- †Cylindricum
- †Cymbophora
  - †Cymbophora canonensis – or unidentified comparable form
  - †Cymbophora formosa
  - †Cymbophora holmesi
- †Cyperacites
- †Czekanowskia
  - †Czekanowskia nervosa

== D ==
- †Dakotasaurus – type locality for genus
  - †Dakotasaurus browni – type locality for species
- †Daspletosaurus
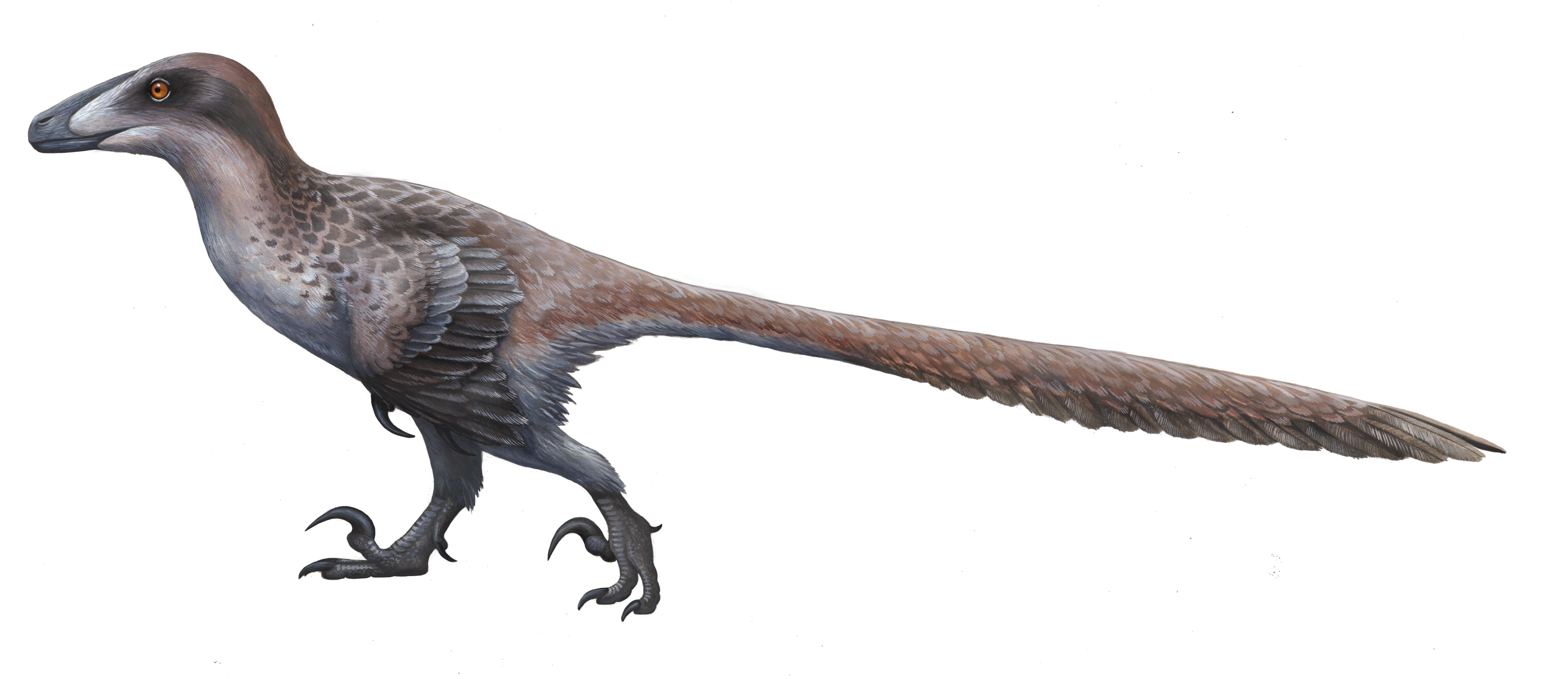
- Life restoration of the Early Cretaceous dromaeosaur ("raptor") Deinonychus
  †Deinonychus
  - †Deinonychus antirrhopus
- †Delphodon
  - †Delphodon comptus – type locality for species
- †Deltatheroides – or unidentified comparable form
- †Dennstaedtia
  - †Dennstaedtia fremonti
- Dentalium
  - †Dentalium gracile
  - †Dentalium pauperculum
- †Derrisemys
  - †Derrisemys sterea
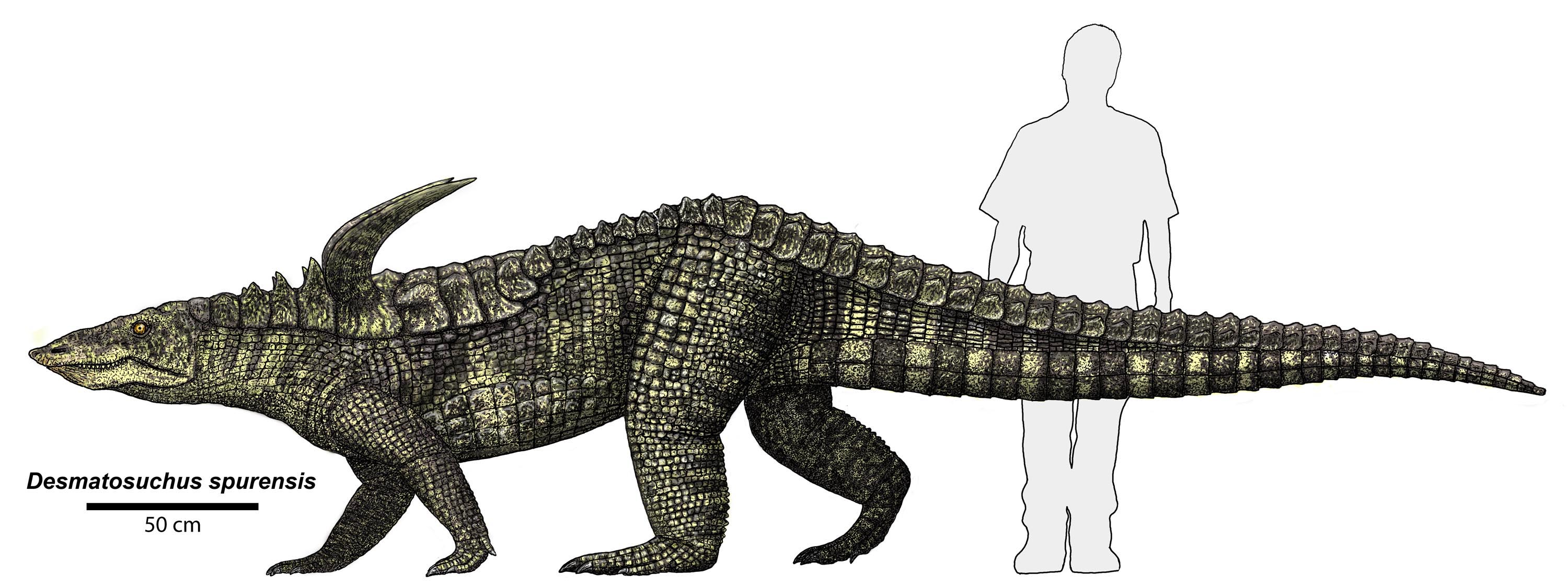
- Restoration of the Late Triassic aetosaur Desmatosuchus with an anachronistic human to scale
  †Desmatosuchus
- †Desmoscaphites
  - †Desmoscaphites bassleri
- †Dewalquea
  - †Dewalquea pulchella
- †Diastopora
  - †Diastopora cutleri – type locality for species
- †Dicellonema
  - †Dicellonema abrekensis
- †Dicotyledon
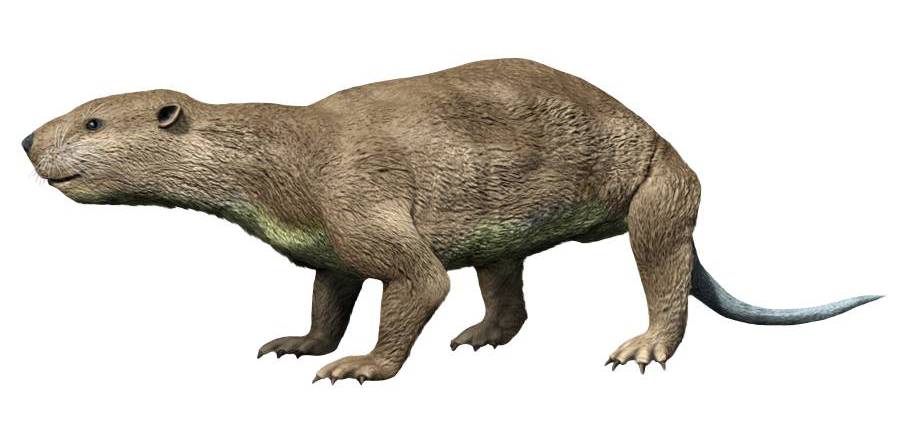
- Life restoration of the Late Cretaceous marsupial relative Didelphodon
  †Didelphodon
  - †Didelphodon vorax – type locality for species
- †Didymoceras
  - †Didymoceras nebrascense
  - †Didymoceras stevensoni
- †Dillenites
  - †Dillenites cleburni
- †Dinochelys
  - †Dinochelys whitei
- †Diospyros
  - †Diospyros stenosepala
- †Diploconcha
- †Diplocraterion
- †Diplodocinae
  - †Diplodocinae – type locality for genus – informal
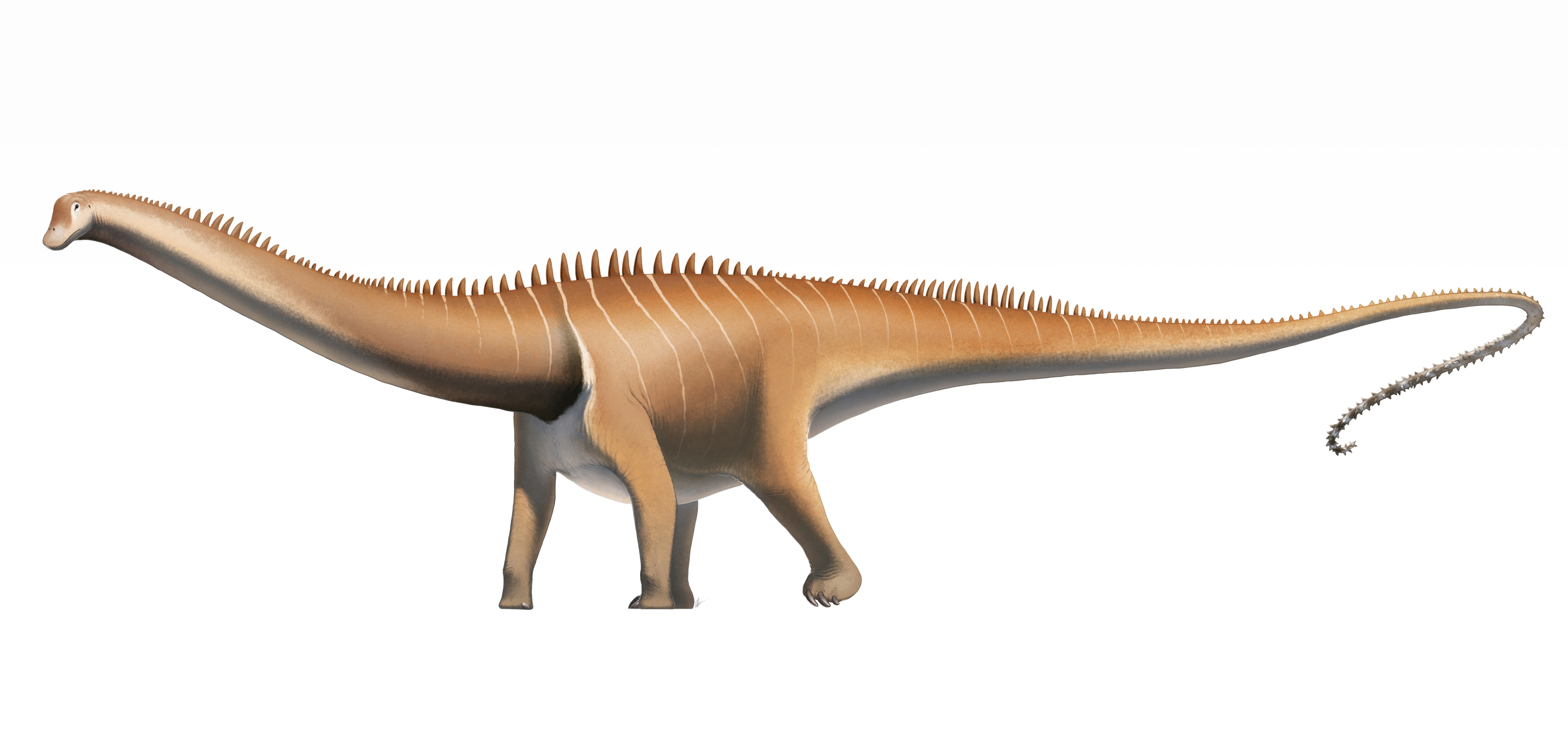
- Life restoration of the Late Jurassic long-necked dinosaur Diplodocus
  †Diplodocus
  - †Diplodocus carnegii – type locality for species
  - †Diplodocus hallorum
  - †Diplodocus longus
- †Discoscaphites
- †Docodon – type locality for genus
  - †Docodon affinis – type locality for species
  - †Docodon crassus – type locality for species
  - †Docodon striatus – type locality for species
  - †Docodon superus – type locality for species
  - †Docodon victor – type locality for species
- †Dolichobrachium – type locality for genus
  - †Dolichobrachium gracile – type locality for species
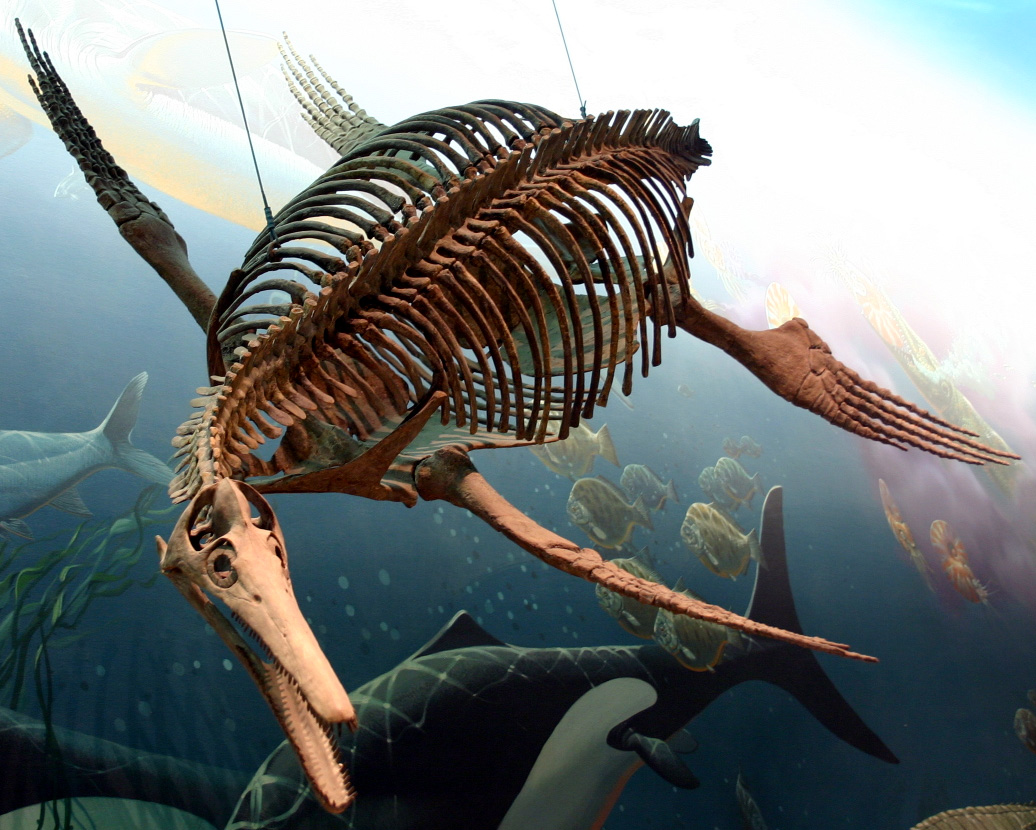
- Mounted fossilized skeleton of the Late Cretaceous plesiosaur Dolichorhynchops
  †Dolichorhynchops
  - †Dolichorhynchops osborni
- †Dombeyopsis
  - †Dombeyopsis colgatensis
  - †Dombeyopsis obtusa
  - †Dombeyopsis platanoides
  - †Dombeyopsis trivialis
- †Doratodon – tentative report
- †Dorsetisaurus
- †Dosiniopsis
  - †Dosiniopsis deweyi
- †Drepanocheilus
  - †Drepanocheilus evansi
  - †Drepanocheilus nebrascensis
  - †Drepanocheilus obesus
  - †Drepanocheilus scotti – or unidentified comparable form
- †Drinker – type locality for genus
  - †Drinker nisti – type locality for species
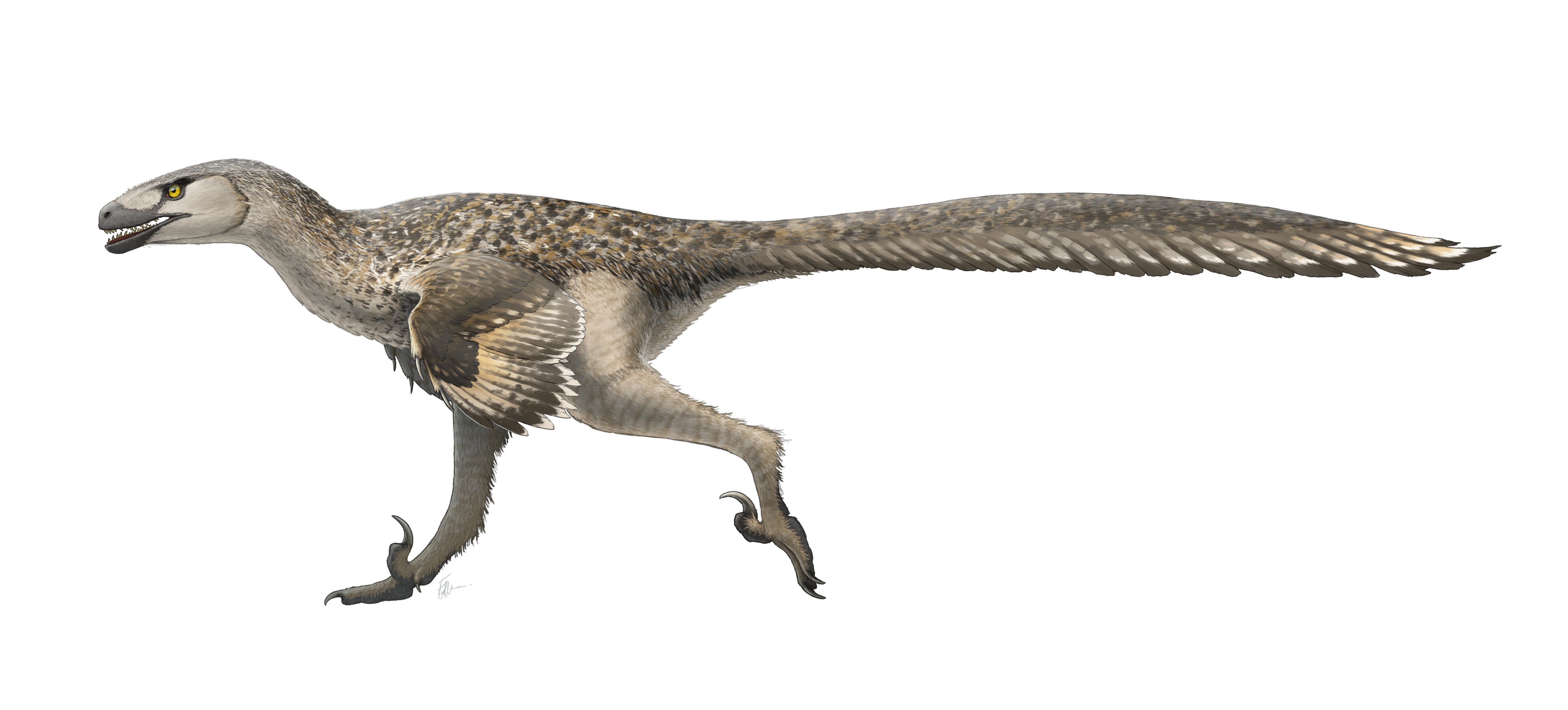
- Life restoration of the Late Cretaceous "raptor" Dromaeosaurus
  †Dromaeosaurus
- †Dryandroides
  - †Dryandroides lanceolata
- †Dryolestes – type locality for genus
  - †Dryolestes priscus – type locality for species
  - †Dryolestes vorax
- †Dryophyllum – type locality for genus
  - †Dryophyllum lanceolatum
  - †Dryophyllum polymorphum – type locality for species
  - †Dryophyllum subfalcatum
- Dryopteris
  - †Dryopteris coloradensis
- †Dryosaurus
  - †Dryosaurus altus – type locality for species
- †Dryptosaurus – or unidentified comparable form
- †Dunveganoceras
  - †Dunveganoceras pondi
  - †Dunveganoceras problematicum
- †Dyslocosaurus – type locality for genus
  - †Dyslocosaurus polyonychius – type locality for species

== E ==
- †Echidnocephalus – tentative report
- †Edmontonia
  - †Edmontonia rugosidens – or unidentified comparable form
- †Edmontosaurus
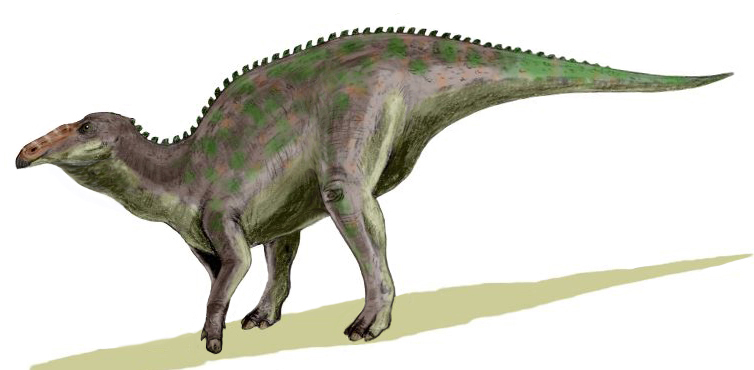
  - Life restoration of the Late Cretaceous duck-billed dinosaur Edmontosaurus annectens
    †Edmontosaurus annectens – type locality for species
- †Egertonodus
- †Elaphrosaurus – tentative report
- †Elasmosaurus
- †Elatides
- †Ellipsoscapha
  - †Ellipsoscapha occidentalis
- †Emarginachelys
- †Empo
- †Enneabatrachus – type locality for genus
  - †Enneabatrachus hechti – type locality for species
- Entalis
  - †Entalis paupercula – tentative report
- †Entalophora
  - †Entalophora stokesi – type locality for species
- †Eobatrachus – type locality for genus
  - †Eobatrachus agilis – type locality for species
- †Eocephalites
  - †Eocephalites primus
- †Eokainaster – type locality for genus
  - †Eokainaster pewei
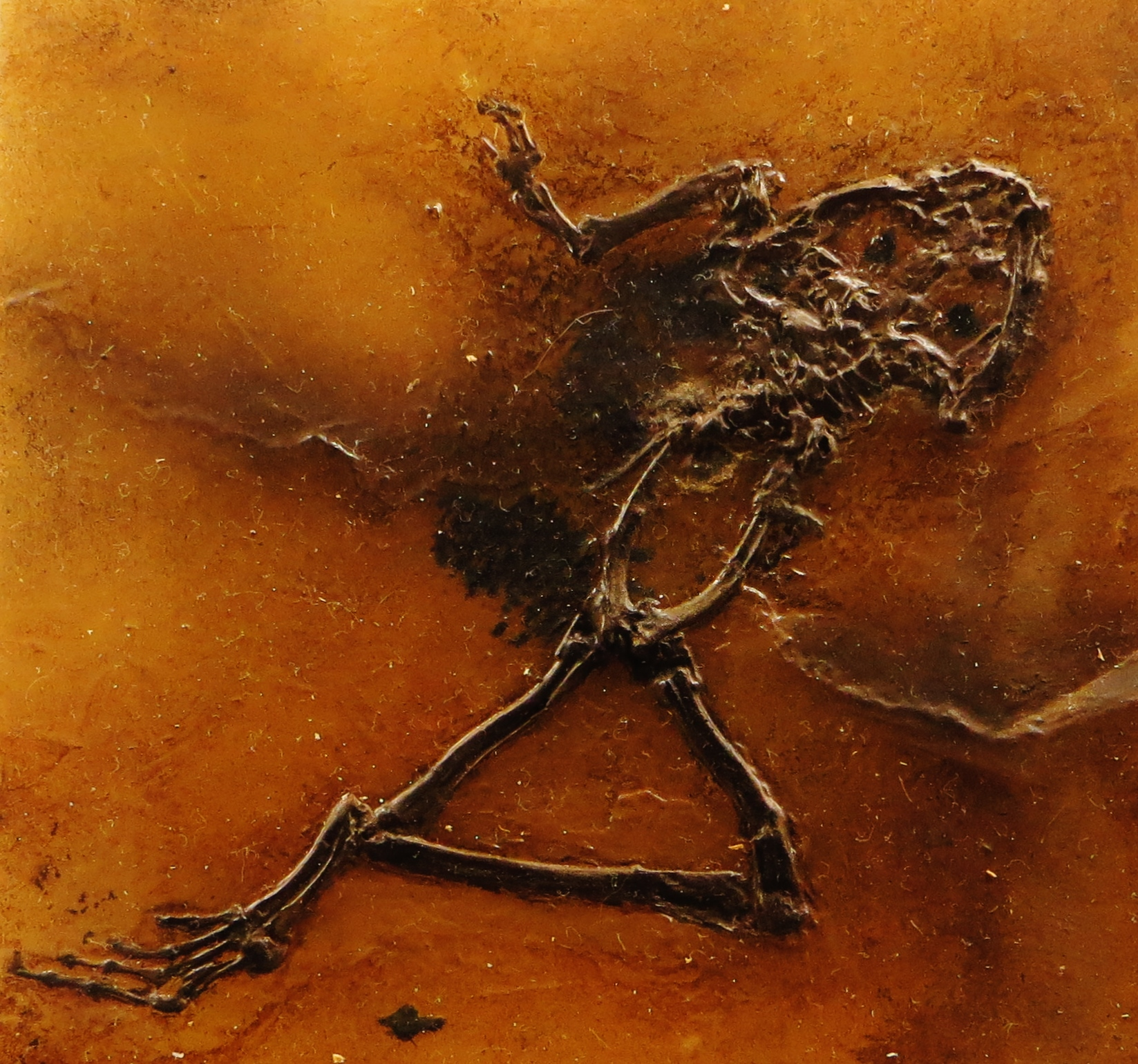
- Fossilized skeleton of the Eocene-Pliocene frog Eopelobates
  †Eopelobates
- †Equisetites
- †Equisetum
  - †Equisetum FF014 – informal
  - †Equisetum RS016 – informal
  - †Equisetum virginicum
- †Essonodon
  - †Essonodon browni
- †Estescincosaurus – type locality for genus
  - †Estescincosaurus cooki – type locality for species
- †Eubaena – type locality for genus
  - †Eubaena cephalica – type locality for species
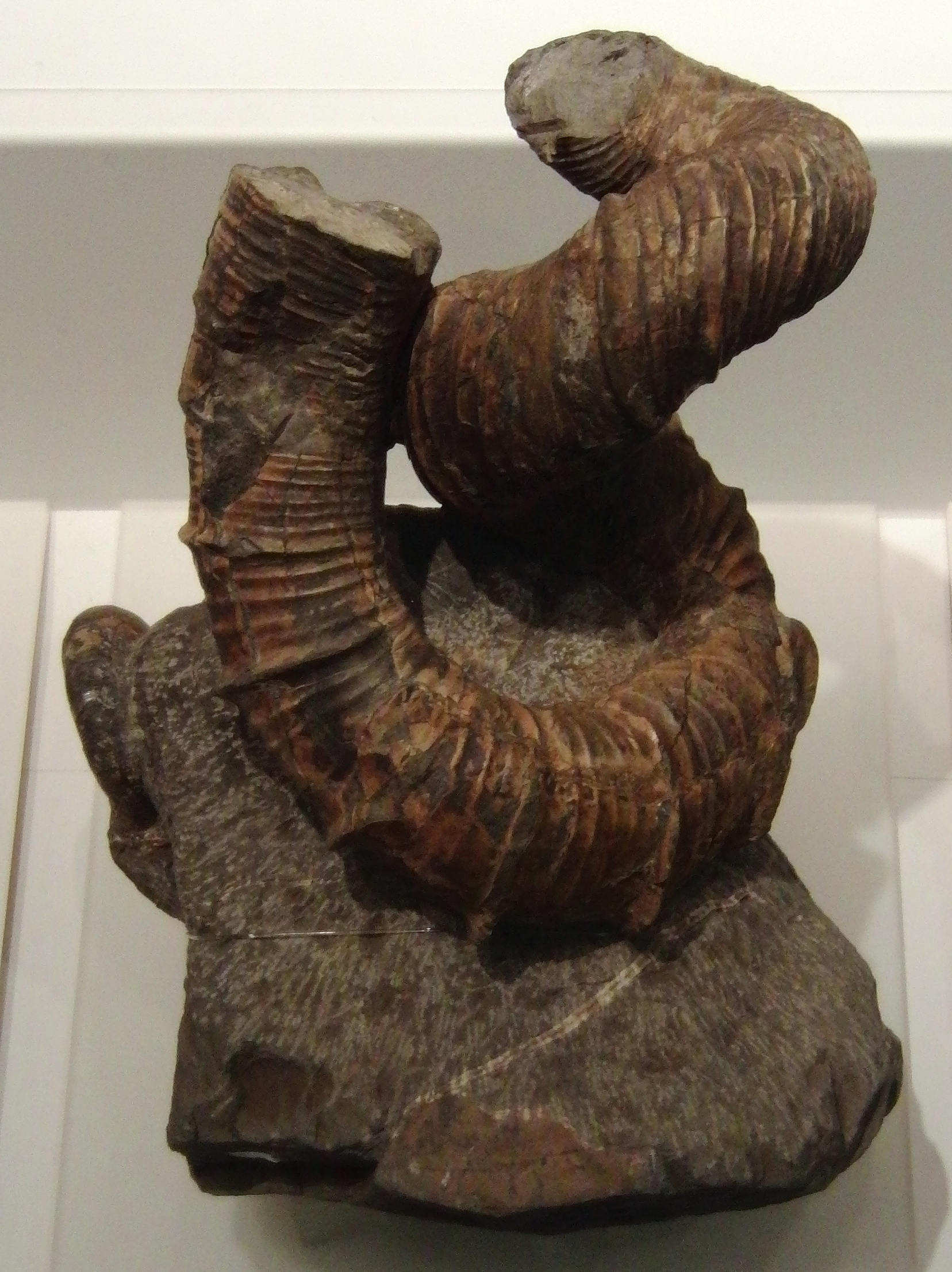
- Fossilized shell of the Late Cretaceous ammonoid cephalopod Eubostrychoceras
  †Eubostrychoceras
  - †Eubostrychoceras matsumotoi – type locality for species
- †Eubrachiosaurus – type locality for genus
  - †Eubrachiosaurus browni – type locality for species
- †Eucalycoceras
  - †Eucalycoceras templetonense
- †Eucrossorhinus
  - †Eucrossorhinus microcuspidatus
- †Eumorphotis
  - †Eumorphotis multiformis
- †Euomphaloceras
  - †Euomphaloceras merewetheri
- †Eurysalenia
  - †Eurysalenia minima
- †Euspira
  - †Euspira obliquata
- †Euthlastus – type locality for genus
  - †Euthlastus cordiformis – type locality for species
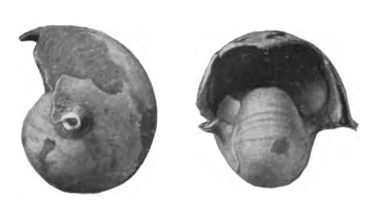
- Illustration in multiple views of a fossilized shell of the Late Jurassic-Miocene nautiloid cephalopod Eutrephoceras
  †Eutrephoceras
  - †Eutrephoceras montanaense
- †Eutretauranosuchus
  - †Eutretauranosuchus delfsi
- †Exiteloceras
  - †Exiteloceras jenneyi
- †Exogyra
  - †Exogyra costata
- †Exostinus – type locality for genus
  - †Exostinus lancensis – type locality for species

== F ==
- †Falepetrus
  - †Falepetrus barwini – type locality for species
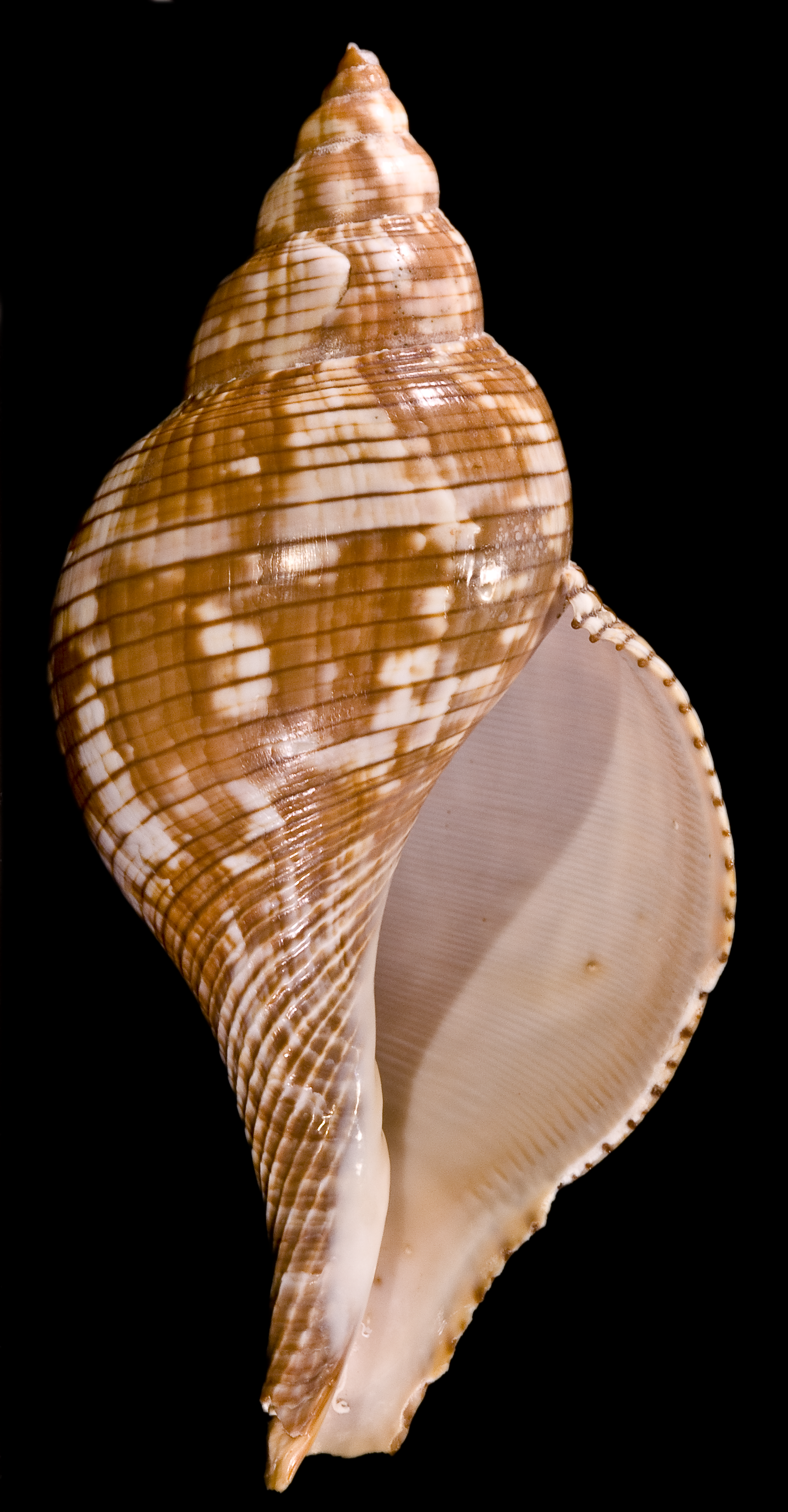
- Shell of a Fasciolaria, or tulip sea snail
  Fasciolaria
  - †Fasciolaria flexicostata – tentative report
- †Feistmantelia – type locality for genus
  - †Feistmantelia oblonga – type locality for species
- †Ficophyllum
  - †Ficophyllum serratum
- Ficus
  - †Ficus fremonti
  - †Ficus Fremontii
  - †Ficus inaequalis
  - †Ficus paryearensis
  - †Ficus planicosta
  - †Ficus planicostata
  - †Ficus rockvalensis
  - †Ficus trinervis
- †Filicites
  - †Filicites knowltoni
- †Forresteria
  - †Forresteria stantoni
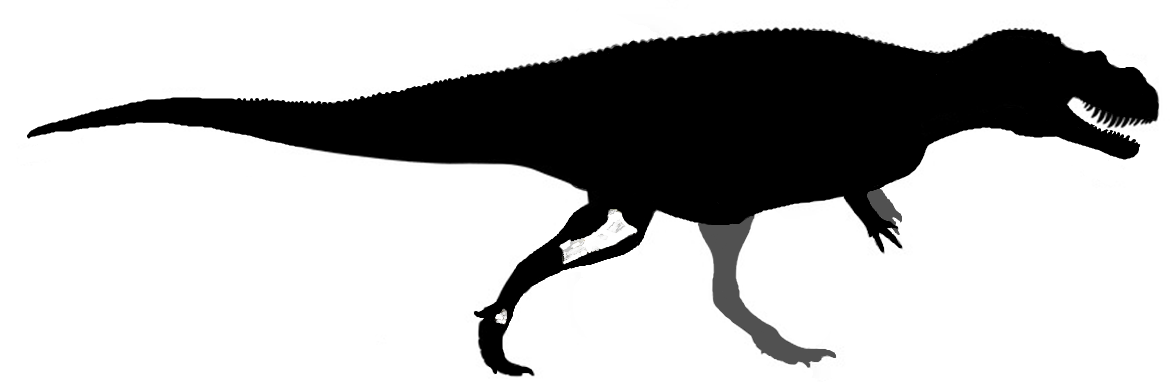
- Known material diagram of the Late Jurassic ceratosaur Fosterovenator
  †Fosterovenator – type locality for genus
  - †Fosterovenator churei – type locality for species
- †Foxraptor – type locality for genus
  - †Foxraptor atrox – type locality for species
- †Fraxinus
  - †Fraxinus denticulata
  - †Fraxinus leii

== G ==
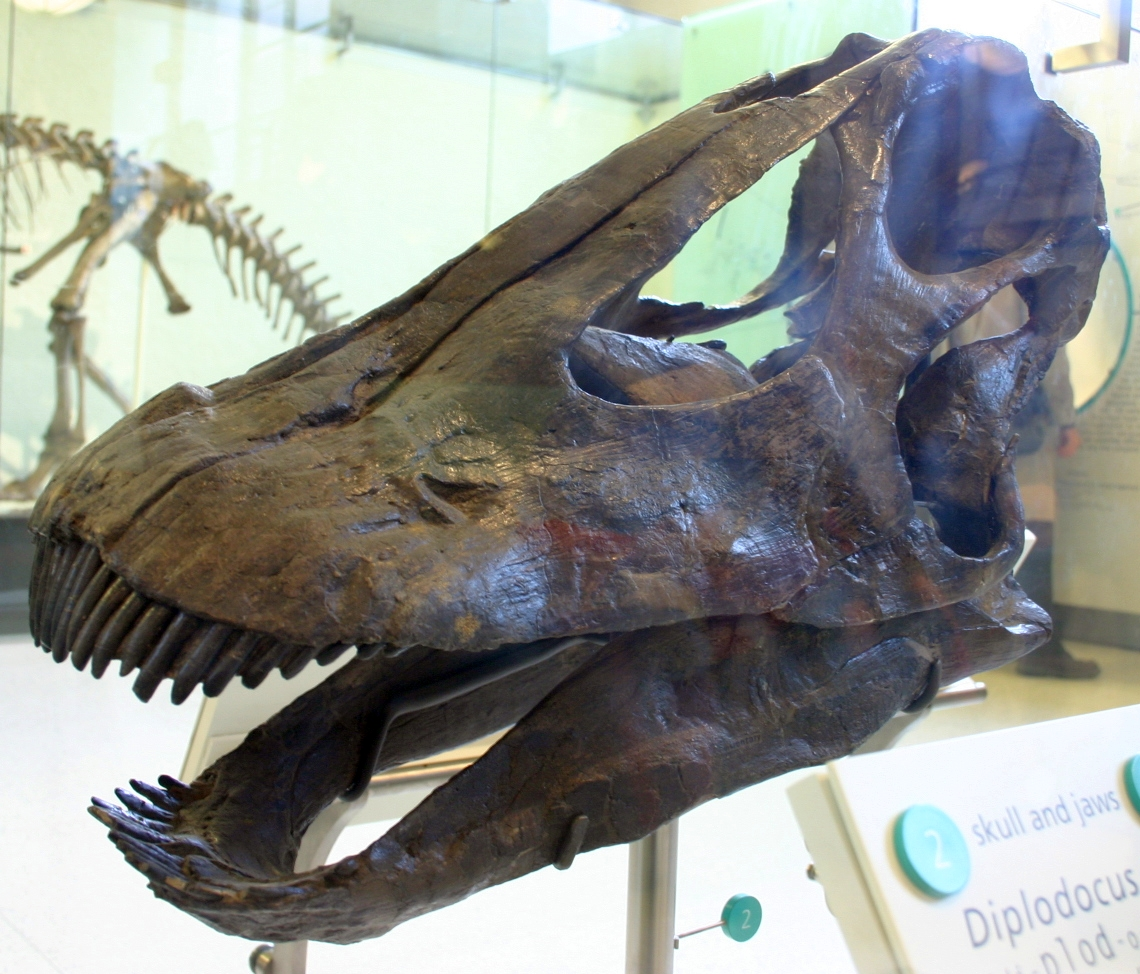
- Fossilized skull of the Late Jurassic long-necked dinosaur Galeamopus
  †Galeamopus
  - †Galeamopus hayi
  - †Galeamopus pabsti – type locality for species
- †Gargoyleosaurus
  - †Gargoyleosaurus parkpinorum
- †Geinitzia
  - †Geinitzia Jenneyi – type locality for species
- †Geonomites
  - †Geonomites schimperi
- Gerrhonotus – or unidentified comparable form
- †Gervillaria
  - †Gervillaria montanaensis
- †Gervillia
  - †Gervillia dolabrata
  - †Gervillia ussurica – or unidentified comparable form
- †Gilmoremys
  - †Gilmoremys lancensis – type locality for species
- Ginglymostoma
  - †Ginglymostoma globidens
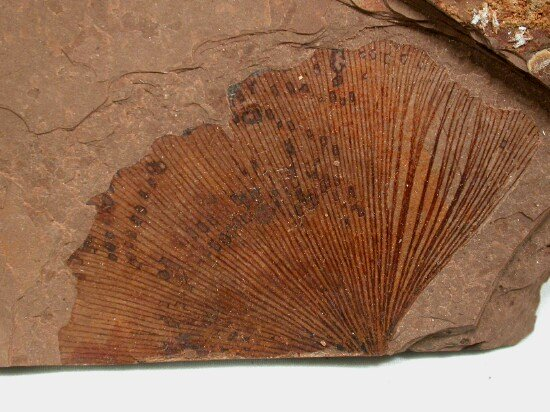
- Fossilized leaf of the Permian-modern tree Ginkgo
  Ginkgo
  - †Ginkgo adiantoides – tentative report
- †Glasbius
  - †Glasbius intricatus – type locality for species
- †Gleichenites
  - †Gleichenites sepulta
- †Glyptops – type locality for genus
  - †Glyptops pervicax
  - †Glyptops plicatulus – type locality for species
- Glyptostrobus
  - †Glyptostrobus brookensis
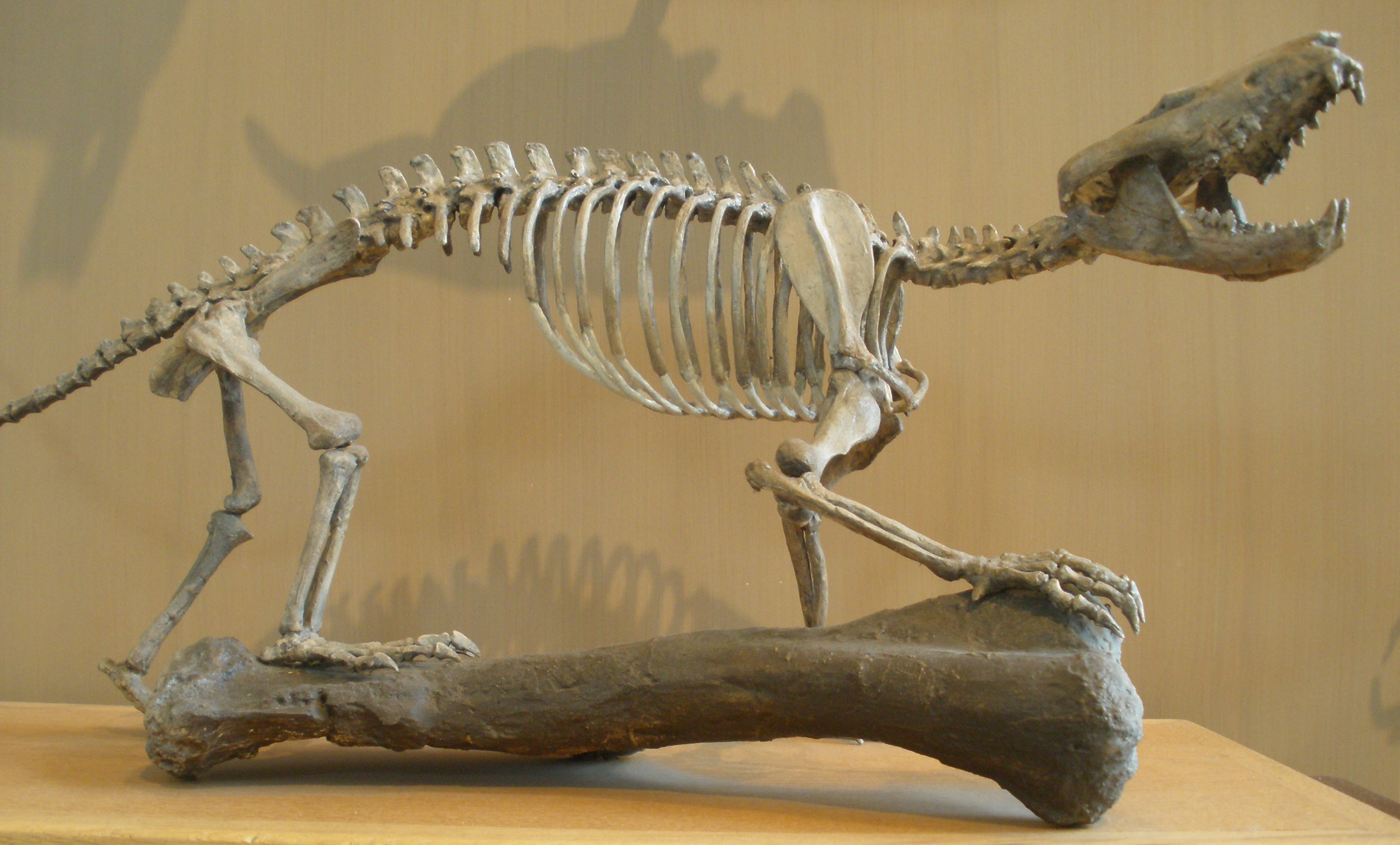
- Mounted fossilized skeleton of the Middle Jurassic-Late Cretaceous mammal Gobiconodon
  †Gobiconodon
  - †Gobiconodon ostromi
- †Goniomya
  - †Goniomya montanaensis
- †Goniopholis
- †Gracilimanus
  - †Gracilimanus obscurus
- †Grammatodon
  - †Grammatodon haguei
- †Graphidula
  - †Graphidula alleni – or unidentified comparable form
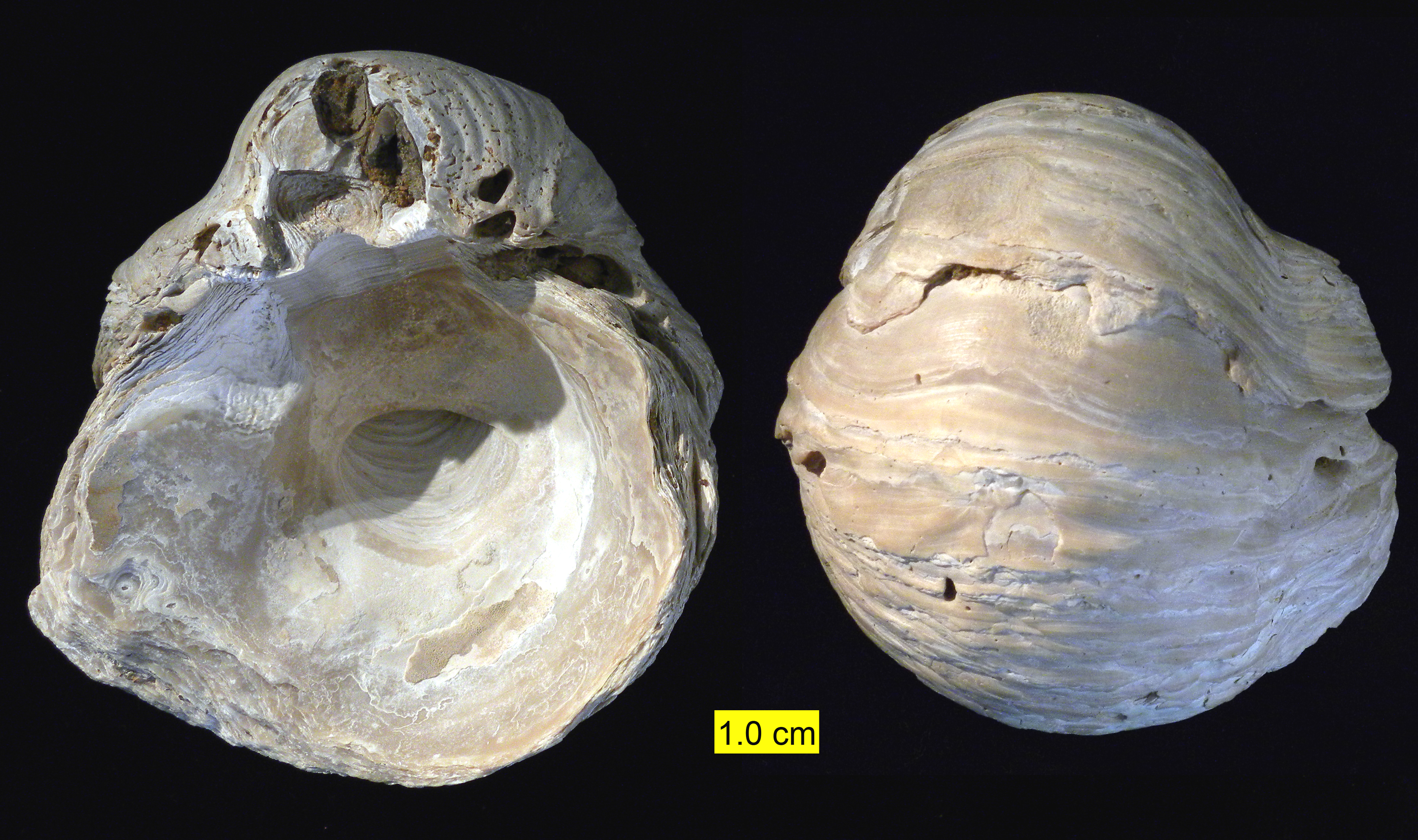
  - Interior and exterior of a fossilized shell of the Late Triassic-Eocene marine bivalve Gryphaea
    †Graphidula culbertsoni
- †Grewiopsis
  - †Grewiopsis saportana
- †Gryphaea
  - †Gryphaea nebrascensis
  - †Gryphaea planoconvexa
- †Gypsonictops
  - †Gypsonictops hypoconus – type locality for species
  - †Gypsonictops lewisi
- †Gypsonicus
  - †Gypsonicus wyomingensis

== H ==
- †Habrosaurus – type locality for genus
  - †Habrosaurus dilatus – type locality for species
- †Hadrosauropodus
- †Halymenites
  - †Halymenites major
- †Hamites
  - †Hamites cimarronensis
  - †Hamites novimexicanus
  - †Hamites salebrosus
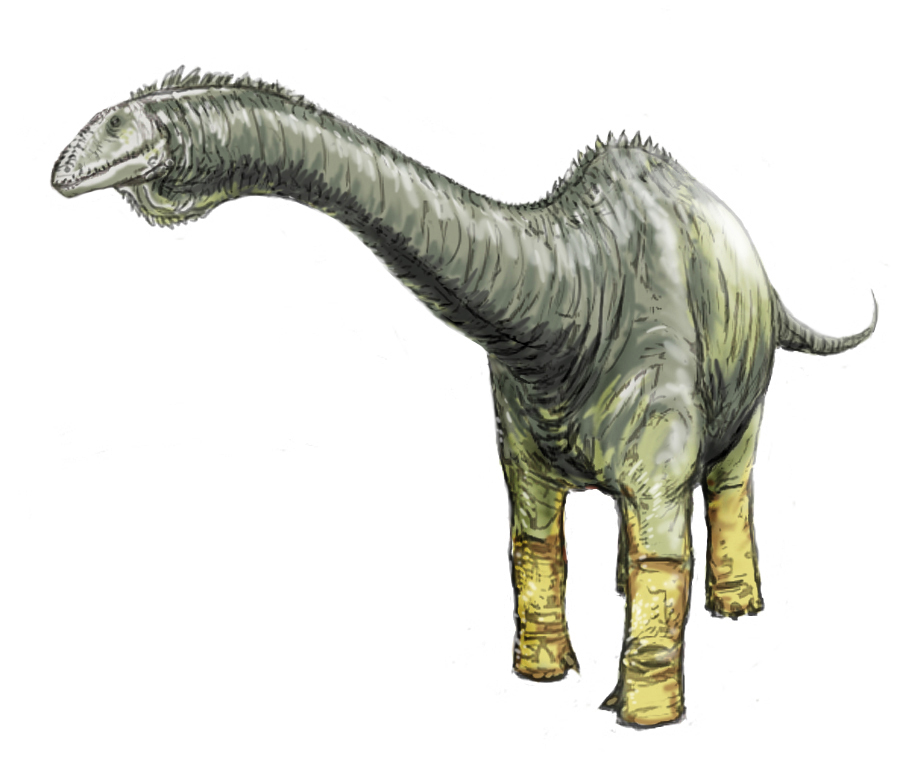
- Life restoration of the Late Jurassic sauropod dinosaur Haplocanthosaurus
  †Haplocanthosaurus
- †Haptosphenus – type locality for genus
  - †Haptosphenus placodon – type locality for species
- †Haresiceras
  - †Haresiceras natronense
- †Harpactognathus – type locality for genus
  - †Harpactognathus gentryii – type locality for species
- †Hatcheritherium – type locality for genus
  - †Hatcheritherium alpha – type locality for species
- †Hausmannia
  - †Hausmannia AF017
- †Helopanoplia
  - †Helopanoplia distincta
- Hemiaster
  - †Hemiaster humphreysanus
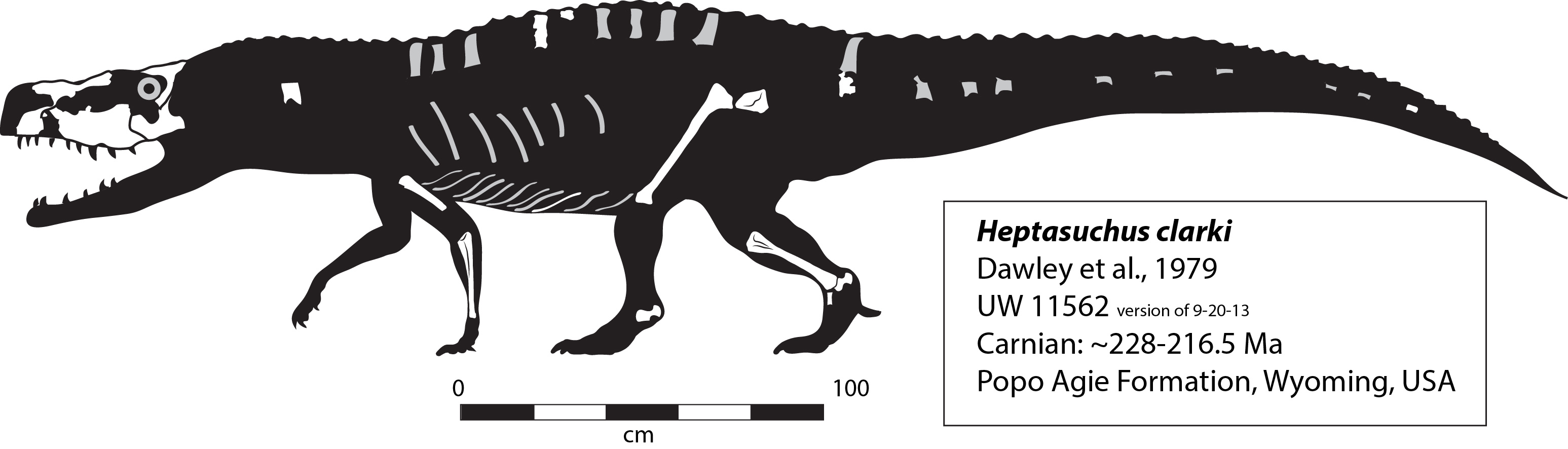
- Known material diagram of the Middle-Late Triassic distant crocodilian relative Heptasuchus
  †Heptasuchus – type locality for genus
  - †Heptasuchus clarki – type locality for species
- †Herpetarius
  - †Herpetarius humilis
- †Hesperornithoides – type locality for genus
  - †Hesperornithoides miessleri – type locality for species
- †Hesperosaurus – type locality for genus
  - †Hesperosaurus mjosi – type locality for species
- †Heteroceras
  - †Heteroceras cochleatum – tentative report
- †Homomya
  - †Homomya gallatinensis
- †Hoploscaphites
  - †Hoploscaphites birkelundae – type locality for species
  - †Hoploscaphites gilli
  - †Hoploscaphites macer
  - †Hoploscaphites nodosus
  - †Hoploscaphites plenus
  - †Hoploscaphites quadrangularis
- †Hummelichelys
  - †Hummelichelys beecheri – type locality for species
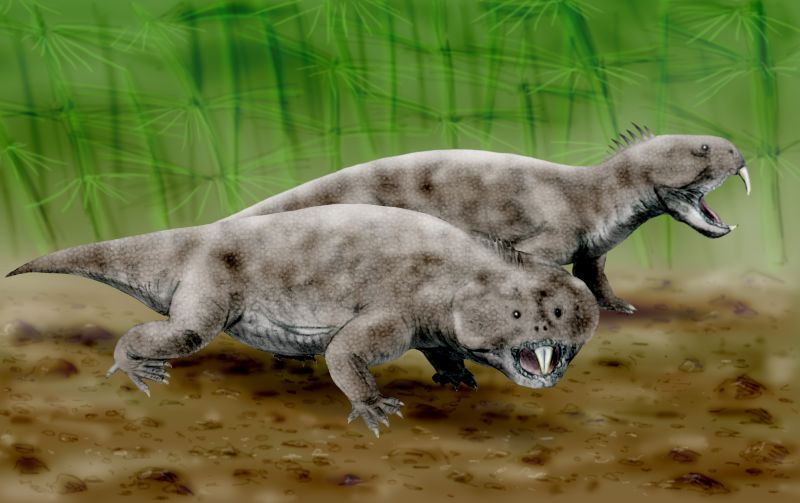
- Life restoration of the Late Triassic rhynchosaur Hyperodapedon
  †Hybodus
  - †Hybodus montanensis
  - †Hybodus wyomingensis – type locality for species
- †Hyperodapedon
  - †Hyperodapedon sanjuanensis – or unidentified comparable form
- †Hypotodus
  - †Hypotodus grandis
- †Hypsodon – tentative report
  - †Hypsodon radiatulus

== I ==
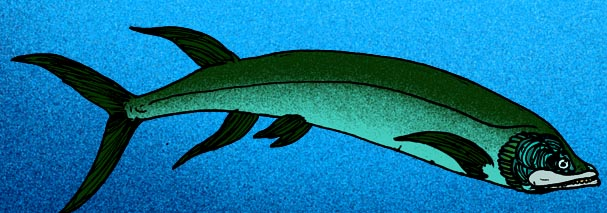
- Life restoration of the Late Cretaceous bony fish Ichthyodectes
  †Ichthyodectes
- †Icthyodectes – tentative report
- †Icthyodesctes – tentative report
- †Idiohamites
  - †Idiohamites bispinosus
- †Iguanavus
  - †Iguanavus teres – type locality for species
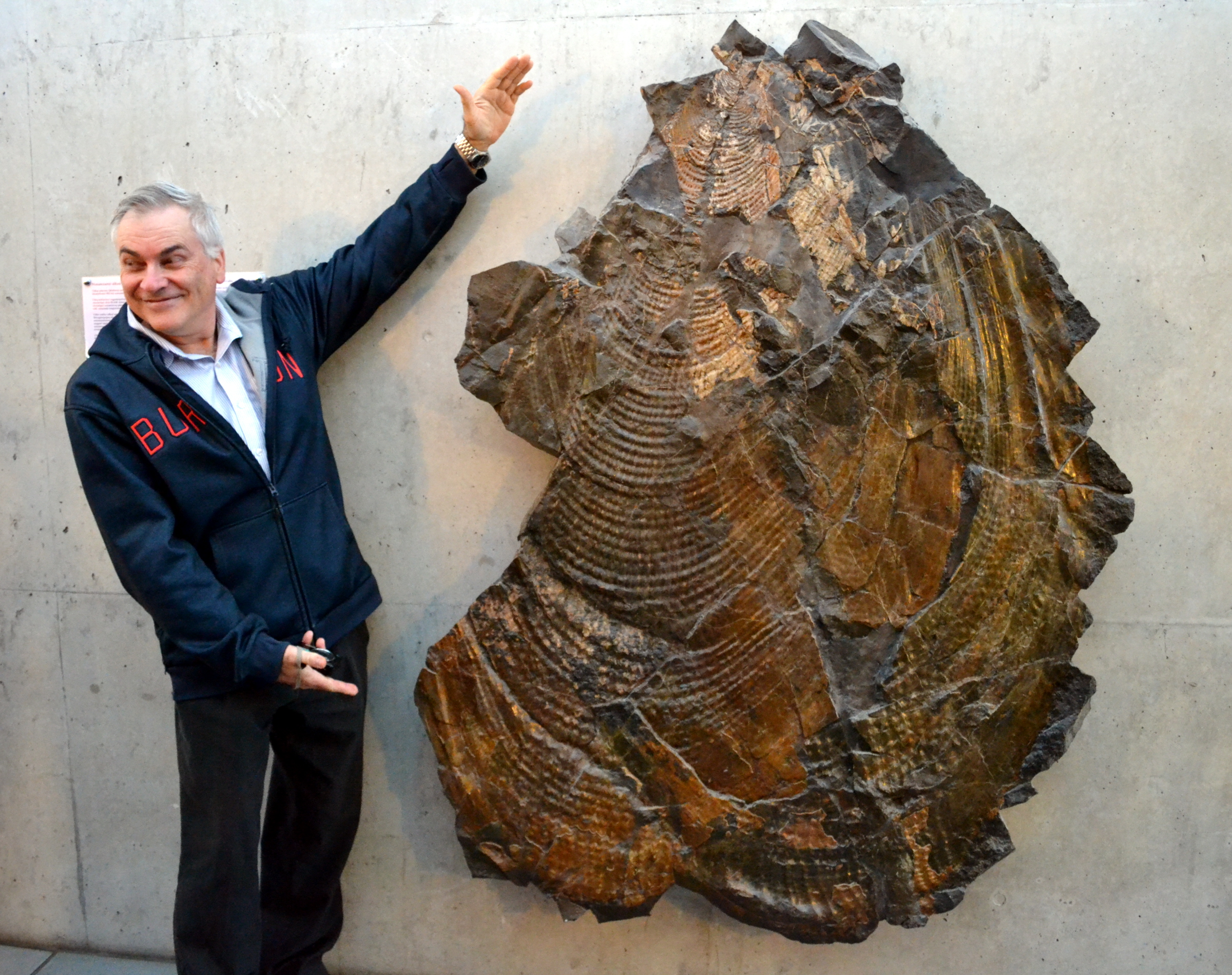
- Fossilized shell of the Early Jurassic-Late Cretaceous marine bivalve Inoceramus with a human indicating its size
  †Inoceramus
  - †Inoceramus agdjakendensis – or unidentified comparable form
  - †Inoceramus americanus – type locality for species
  - †Inoceramus anglicus
  - †Inoceramus balchii
  - †Inoceramus barabini
  - †Inoceramus crispii
  - †Inoceramus deformis
  - †Inoceramus dimidius
  - †Inoceramus erectus – or unidentified related form
  - †Inoceramus fibrosus
  - †Inoceramus fragilis – or unidentified related form
  - †Inoceramus gibbosus
  - †Inoceramus glacierensis
  - †Inoceramus grandis
  - †Inoceramus incurvus
  - †Inoceramus lundbreckensis
  - †Inoceramus perplexus
  - †Inoceramus prefragilis
  - †Inoceramus proximus – or unidentified related form
  - †Inoceramus sagensis
  - †Inoceramus subcircularis
  - †Inoceramus subcompressus
  - †Inoceramus sublaevis
  - †Inoceramus tenuirostratus
  - †Inoceramus tenuiumbonatus – or unidentified comparable form
  - †Inoceramus turgidus – or unidentified related form
  - †Inoceramus typicus
  - †Inoceramus umbonatus
  - †Inoceramus undabundus
- †Ischyrhiza
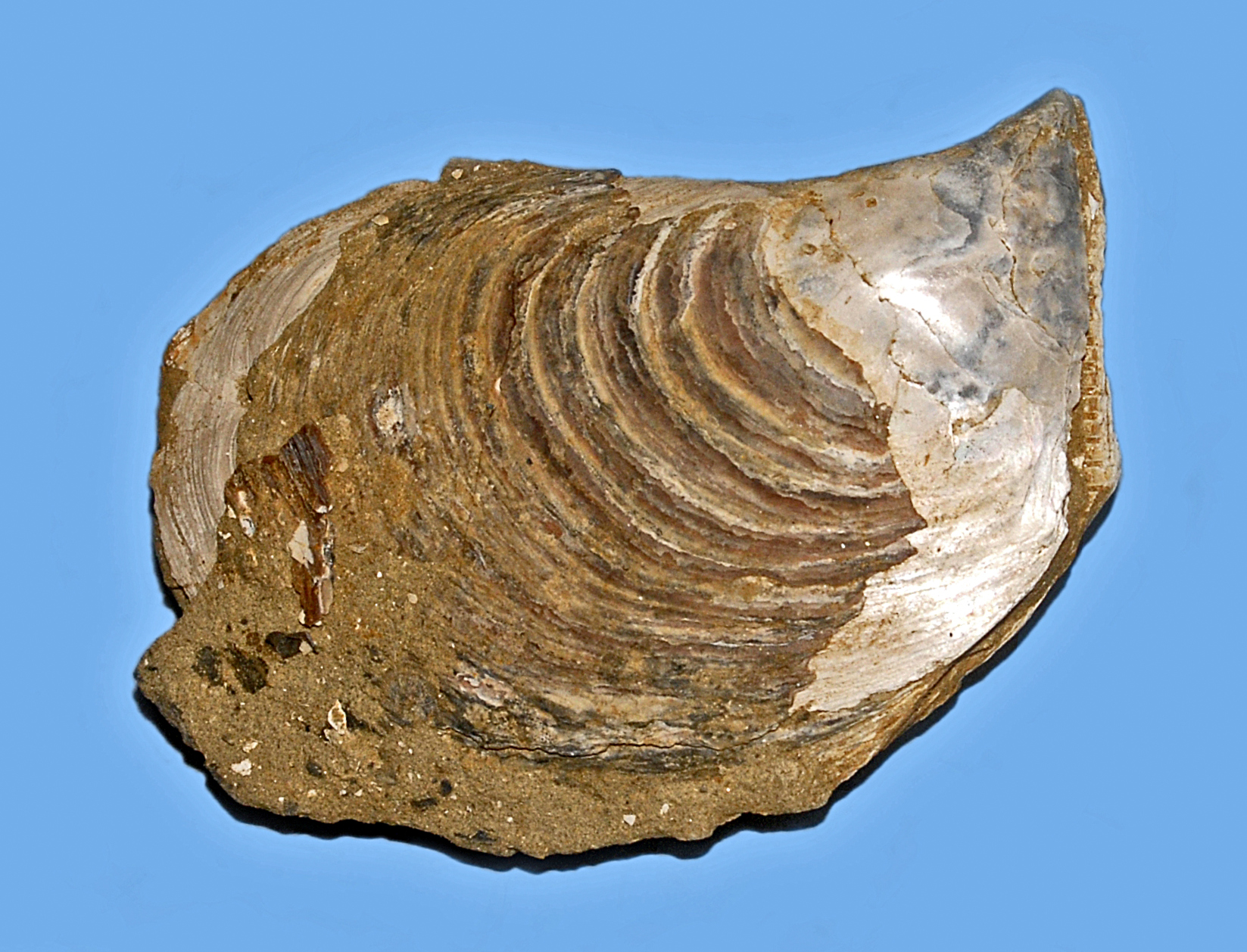
  - Fossilized shell of the Permian-modern marine bivalve Isognomon
    †Ischyrhiza avonicola – type locality for species
  - †Ischyrhiza basinensis – type locality for species
  - †Ischyrhiza mira
- Isocrinus
  - †Isocrinus knighti
  - †Isocrinus wyomingensis
- †Isocyprina
  - †Isocyprina cinnabarensis
- Isognomon
  - †Isognomon perplana – or unidentified comparable form
- Isurus – tentative report

== J ==
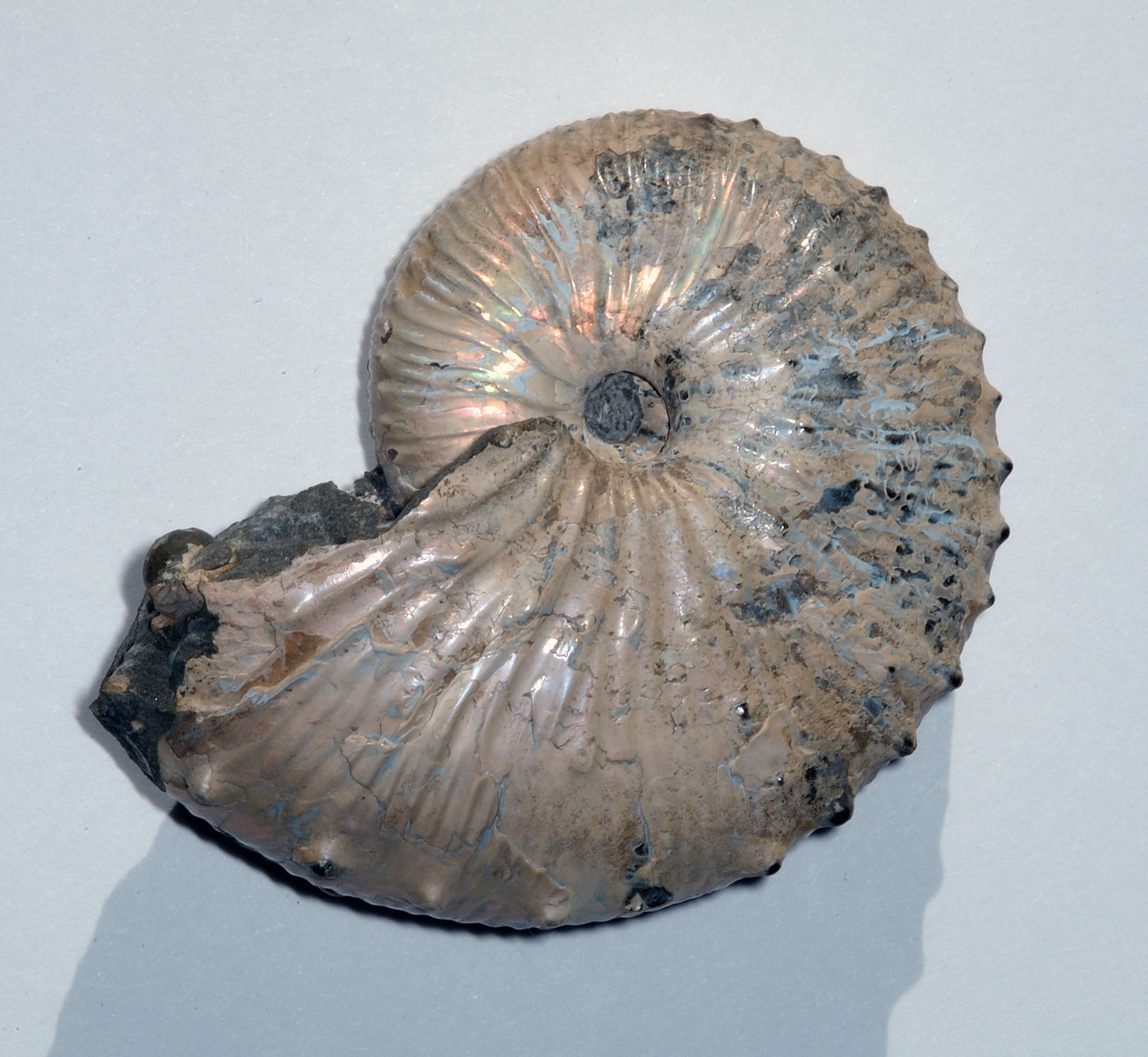
Fossilized shell of the Late Cretaceous ammonoid cephalopod Jeletzkytes

- †Janumys
- †Jeletzkytes
  - †Jeletzkytes dorfi – type locality for species
- †Jensensispermum
- †Judithemys
  - †Judithemys backmani

== K ==
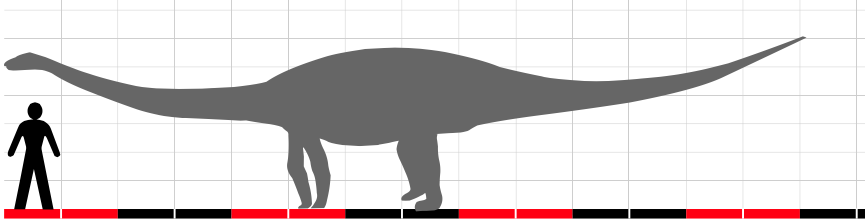
Diagram illustrating the size of the Late Jurassic long-necked dinosaur Kaatedocus with an anachronistic human to scale

- †Kaatedocus – type locality for genus
  - †Kaatedocus siberi – type locality for species
- †Koskinonodon – type locality for genus
  - †Koskinonodon perfectus – type locality for species

== L ==
- †Lamarqueavis
  - †Lamarqueavis minima – type locality for species
  - †Lamarqueavis petra – type locality for species
- †Lamiasaura – type locality for genus
  - †Lamiasaura ferox – type locality for species
- †Lanceosaurus – type locality for genus
  - †Lanceosaurus compressus – type locality for species
  - †Lanceosaurus hatcheri – type locality for species
- †Laolestes – type locality for genus
  - †Laolestes eminens – type locality for species
  - †Laolestes goodrichi – type locality for species
  - †Laolestes oweni – type locality for species
- †Laopteryx – type locality for genus
  - †Laopteryx priscus – type locality for species
- †Laosaurus – type locality for genus
  - †Laosaurus celer – type locality for species
- †Laurophyllum
  - †Laurophyllum coloradensis
  - †Laurophyllum meeki
  - †Laurophyllum salicifolium
  - †Laurophyllum wardiana
- Laurus
  - †Laurus aspensis – type locality for species
- †Lepidotes – or unidentified related form
- Lepisosteus
  - †Lepisosteus occidentalis
- †Leptalestes
  - †Leptalestes cooki – type locality for species
  - †Leptalestes krejcii
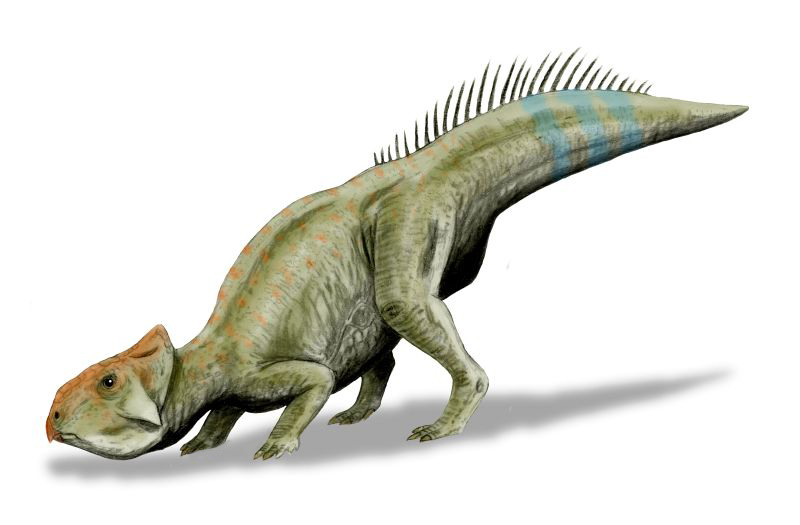
- Life restoration of the Late Cretaceous primitive horned dinosaur Leptoceratops
  †Leptoceratops
  - †Leptoceratops gracilis
- †Leptochamops
  - †Leptochamops denticulatus – type locality for species
  - †Leptochamops thrinax
- †Leptochondria
  - †Leptochondria occidanea
- †Leptostrobus
  - †Leptostrobus alatus – type locality for species
  - †Leptostrobus longifolia
  - †Leptostrobus longifolius
- †Lesterwardia – type locality for genus
  - †Lesterwardia palustris – type locality for species
- †Leucichthyops
  - †Leucichthyops vagans
- †Leucicthyops
  - †Leucicthyops vagans
- Lima
  - †Lima occidentalis
- Lingula
  - †Lingula nitida – or unidentified comparable form
- †Lingularia
  - †Lingularia borealis
- †Lioplacodes – or unidentified comparable form
- †Liostrea
  - †Liostrea strigilecula
- Liquidambar
  - †Liquidambar fontanella – type locality for species
- †Lisserpeton
  - †Lisserpeton bairdi
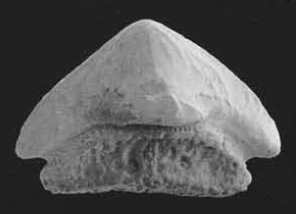
- Electron micrograph of fossilized teeth from the Early Jurassic-Early Cretaceous freshwater shark Lissodus
  †Lissodus
  - †Lissodus griffisi – type locality for species
- †Litakis – type locality for genus
  - †Litakis gilmorei – type locality for species
- †Lonchidion – type locality for genus
  - †Lonchidion selachos – type locality for species
- †Lonchisaurus – type locality for genus
  - †Lonchisaurus trichurus – type locality for species
- †Lonchodytes – type locality for genus
  - †Lonchodytes estesi – type locality for species
  - †Lonchodytes pterygius – type locality for species
- †Lophochelys
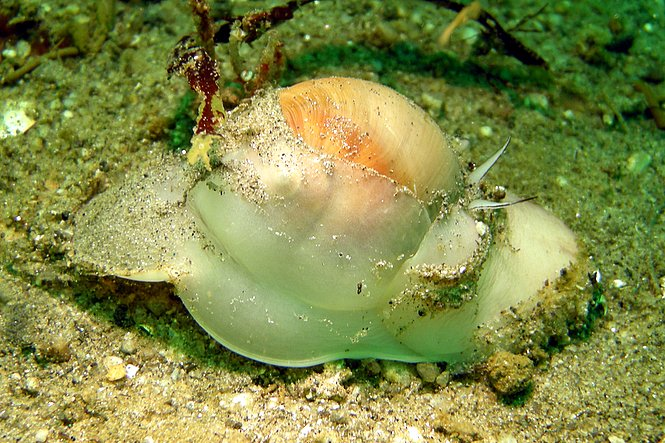
- A living Lunatia moon sea snail
  Lucina
  - †Lucina mattiformis – or unidentified comparable form
  - †Lucina occidentalis
  - †Lucina subundata
- Lunatia – tentative report
- Lygodium
  - †Lygodium AF030 – informal
- †Lyosoma
  - †Lyosoma powelli

== M ==
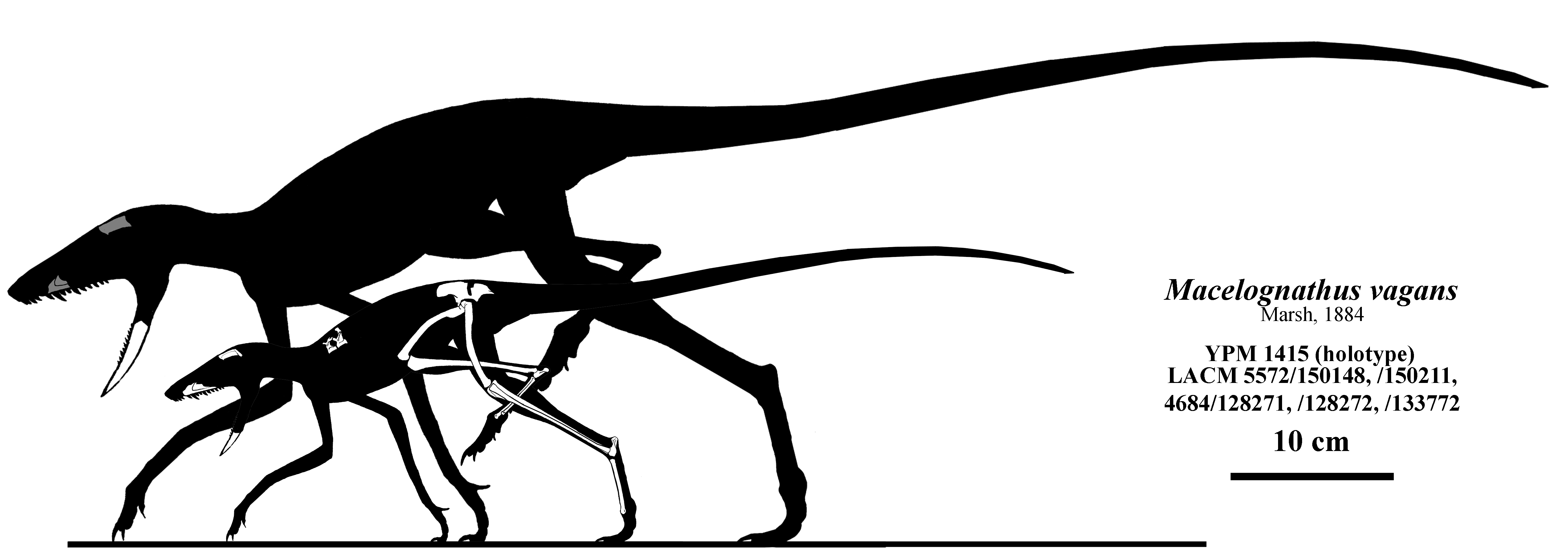
- Diagram illustrating the known fossil material of two specimens of the Late Jurassic crocodile relative Macelognathus
  †Macelognathus – type locality for genus
  - †Macelognathus vagans – type locality for species
- Mactra
  - †Mactra emmonsi
- †Mactromya – tentative report
- †Magadiceramus
  - †Magadiceramus soukupi
  - †Magadiceramus subquadratus
- †Magnoliophyllum
  - †Magnoliophyllum cordatum
- †Malapoenna
  - †Malapoenna weediana – tentative report
- Malletia
  - †Malletia stephensoni
- †Manihotites
  - †Manihotites georgiana
- †Martinectes
  - †Martinectes bonneri – type locality for species
- †Matonidium
  - †Matonidium Althaausii
  - †Matonidium Althausii
- †Mecochirus
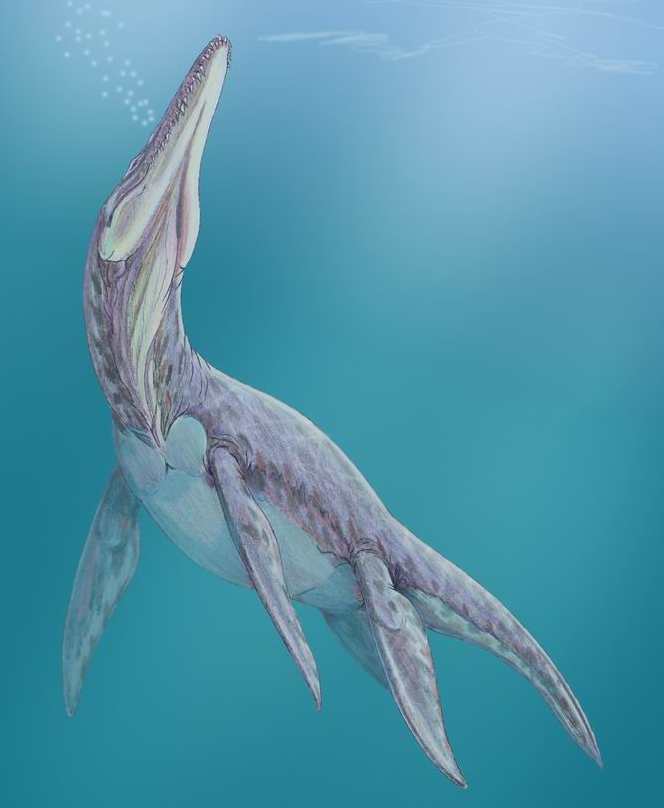
- Life restoration of the Late Jurassic plesiosaur Megalneusaurus
  †Megalneusaurus
  - †Megalneusaurus rex – type locality for species
- †Megasphaeroceras
  - †Megasphaeroceras rotundum – or unidentified comparable form
- †Meleagrinella
  - †Meleagrinella curta
- †Melvius
  - †Melvius thomasi
- †Meniscoessus
  - †Meniscoessus gracilis – type locality for species
  - †Meniscoessus intermedius
  - †Meniscoessus robustus – type locality for species
  - †Meniscoessus seminoensis – type locality for species
- †Meniscognathus – type locality for genus
  - †Meniscognathus altmani – type locality for species
- †Menispermites
  - †Menispermites belli
  - †Menispermites cockerelli
  - †Menispermites knightii
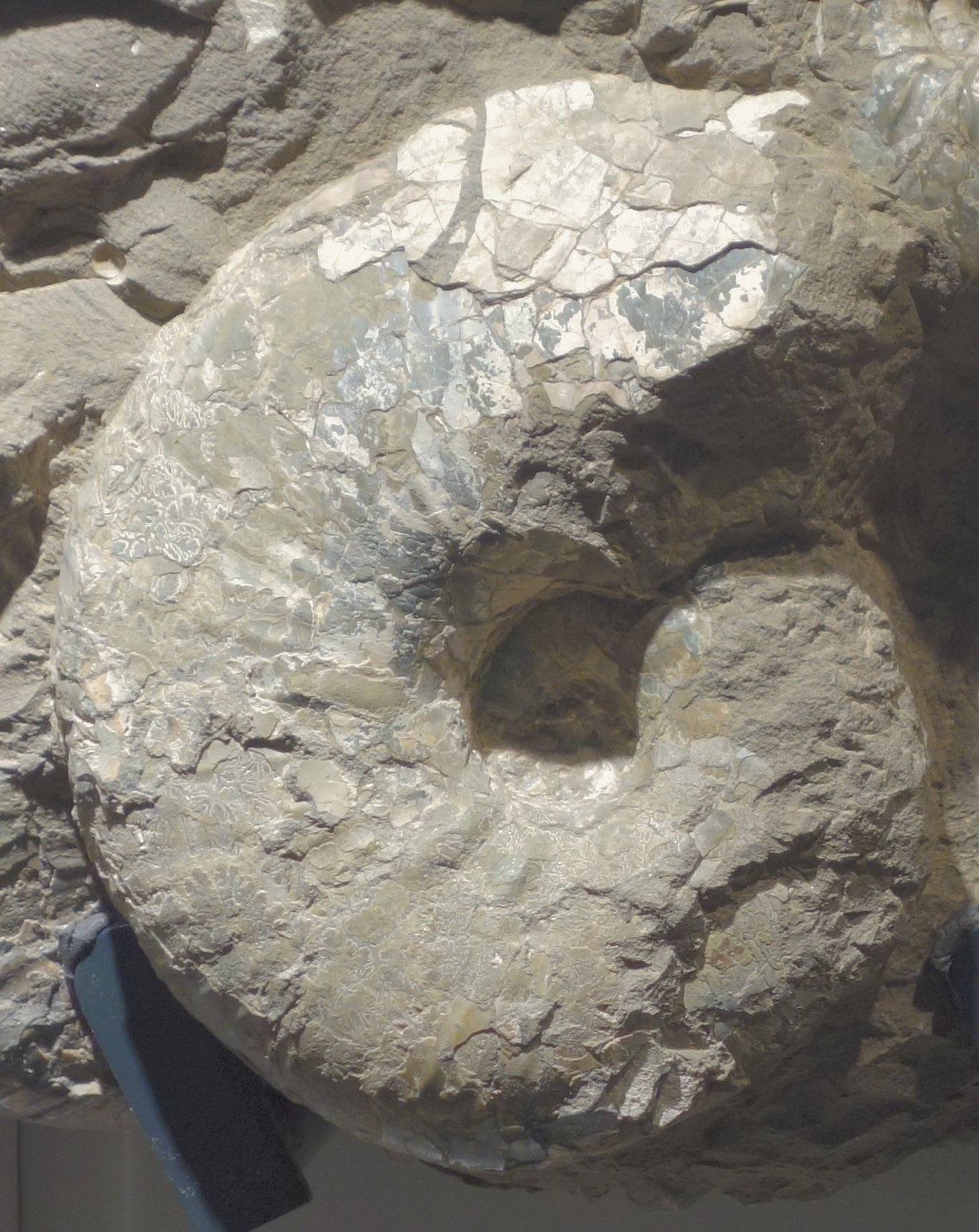
- Assemblage of fossilized shells of the Late Cretaceous ammonoid cephalopod Menuites
  †Menuites
  - †Menuites complexus
- †Mesembrioxylon
- †Mesodma
  - †Mesodma formosa
  - †Mesodma hensleighi
  - †Mesodma primaeva
  - †Mesodma thompsoni – type locality for species
- †Metaptychoceras
- †Metoicoceras
  - †Metoicoceras geslinianum
  - †Metoicoceras mosbyense – or unidentified comparable form
  - †Metoicoceras praecox
- †Micrabacia
  - †Micrabacia radiata
- †Microtaenia
  - †Microtaenia paucifolia
  - †Microtaenia variabilis
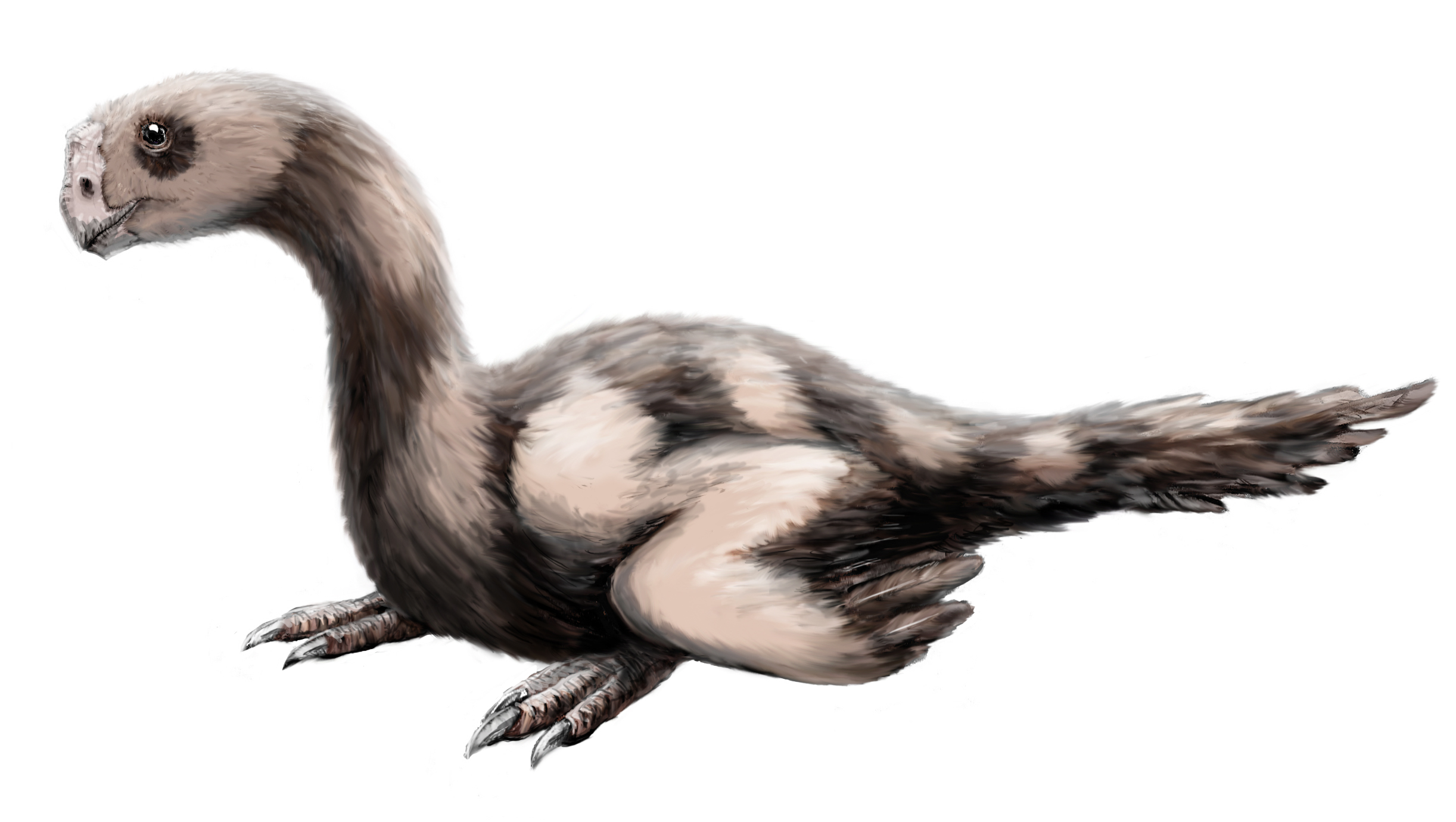
- Life restoration of the Early Cretaceous oviraptorosaur Microvenator
  †Microvenator
  - †Microvenator celer
- †Minerisporites
  - †Minerisporites pseudorichardsonii
- Modiolus
  - †Modiolus meekii
  - †Modiolus subimbricatus
- †Montania – type locality for genus
  - †Montania glandulosa – type locality for species
- †Moremanoceras
  - †Moremanoceras costatum
  - †Moremanoceras scotti
- †Moriconia
  - †Moriconia cyclotoxon
- †Morosaurus
- †Myalina
  - †Myalina postcarbonica
- †Myledaphus
  - †Myledaphus bipartitus
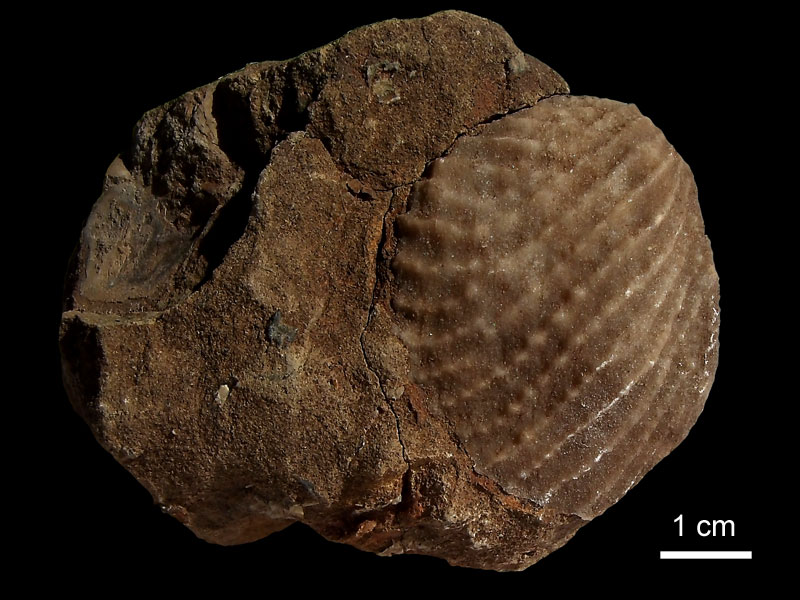
- Fossilized shell of the Jurassic-Cretaceous marine bivalve Myophorella
  †Myophorella
  - †Myophorella yellowstonensis
- Myrica
  - †Myrica bolanderi – tentative report
  - †Myrica nervosa
- †Myrtophyllum
  - †Myrtophyllum torreyi
- †Mytiloides
  - †Mytiloides stantoni
- †Mytilus
  - †Mytilus whitei

== N ==
- †Nageiopsis
  - †Nageiopsis angustifolia
  - †Nageiopsis longifolia
- †Nanocuris
  - †Nanocuris improvida
- †Nanomyops
- †Nanosaurus
  - †Nanosaurus rex
- †Nanotyrannus – tentative report
- †Naomichelys
  - †Naomichelys speciosa
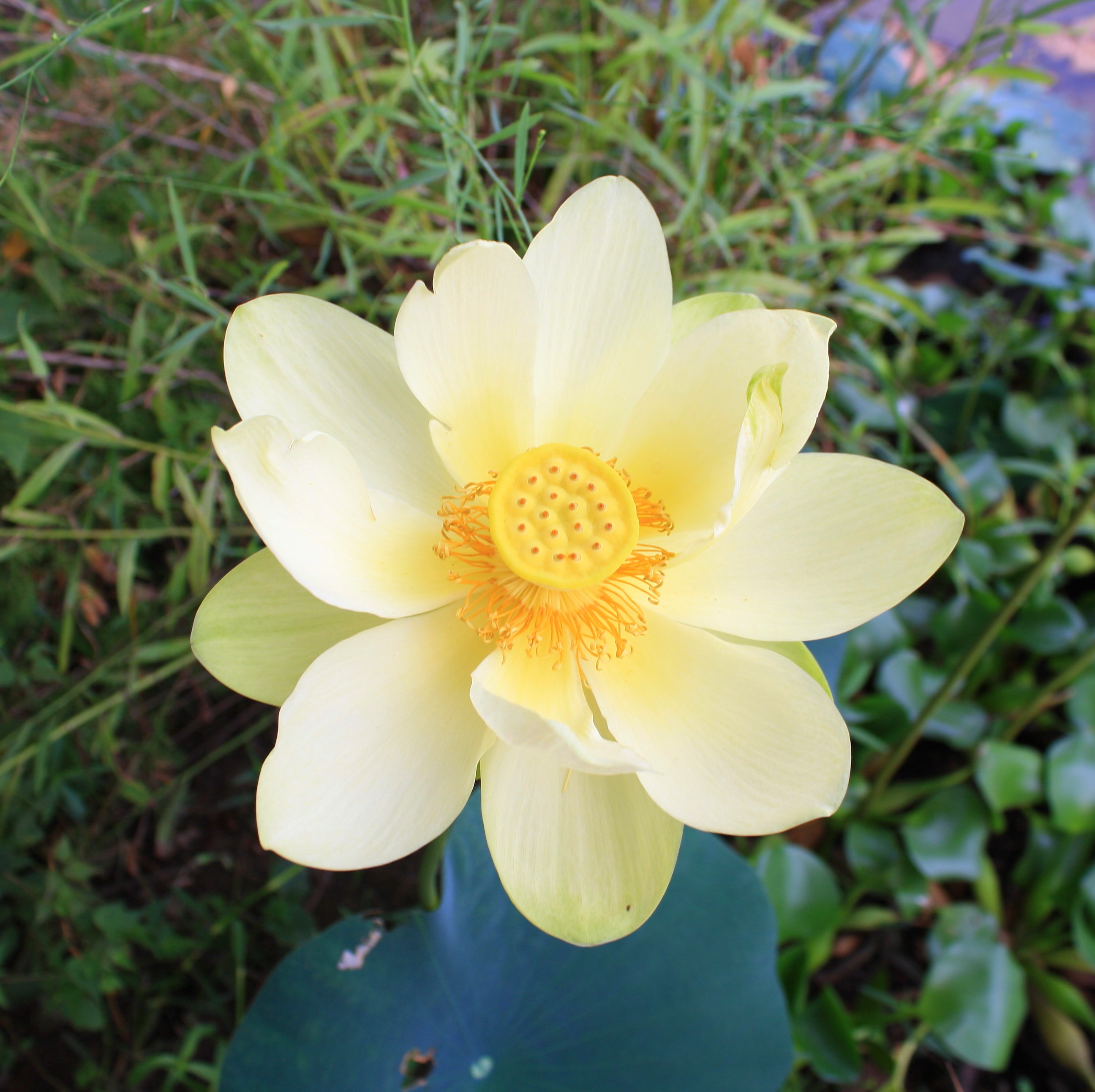
- A living Nelumbo lotus
  †Nelumbo
  - †Nelumbo weymouthi – type locality for species
  - †Nelumbo weymouthii
- †Nemocardium
  - †Nemocardium parahillanum
- †Nemodon
  - †Nemodon eufalensis
  - †Nemodon grandis
- †Neocardioceras
  - †Neocardioceras laevigatum – type locality for species
  - †Neocardioceras minutum – type locality for species
  - †Neocardioceras transiens
  - †Neocardioceras uptonense – type locality for species
- †Neogastroplites
  - †Neogastroplites wyomingensis
- †Neonereites – or unidentified comparable form
  - †Neonereites biserialis
- †Neoplagiaulax
- †Neoschizodus
  - †Neoschizodus laevigatus
- †Nerinea – tentative report
- †Neurankylus
  - †Neurankylus wyomingensis – type locality for species
- †Nilsonia
  - †Nilsonia mehli
  - †Nilsonia nigricollensis
- Nodosaria
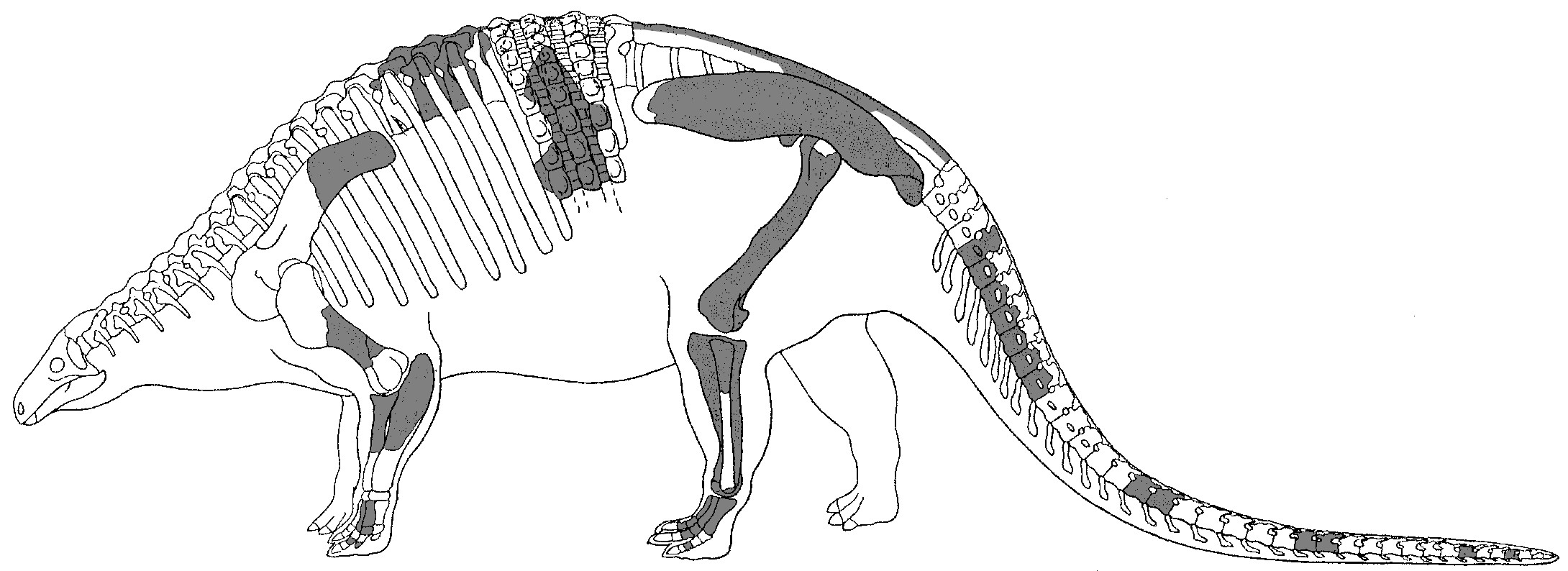
- Historical reconstruction of the holotype skeleton from 1921
  †Nodosaurus – type locality for genus
  - †Nodosaurus textilis – type locality for species
- †Nonactaeonina
  - †Nonactaeonina attenuata
- †Normannites – tentative report
  - †Normannites crickmayi – or unidentified comparable form
- †Nortedelphys
  - †Nortedelphys jasoni
  - †Nortedelphys magnus
  - †Nortedelphys minimus
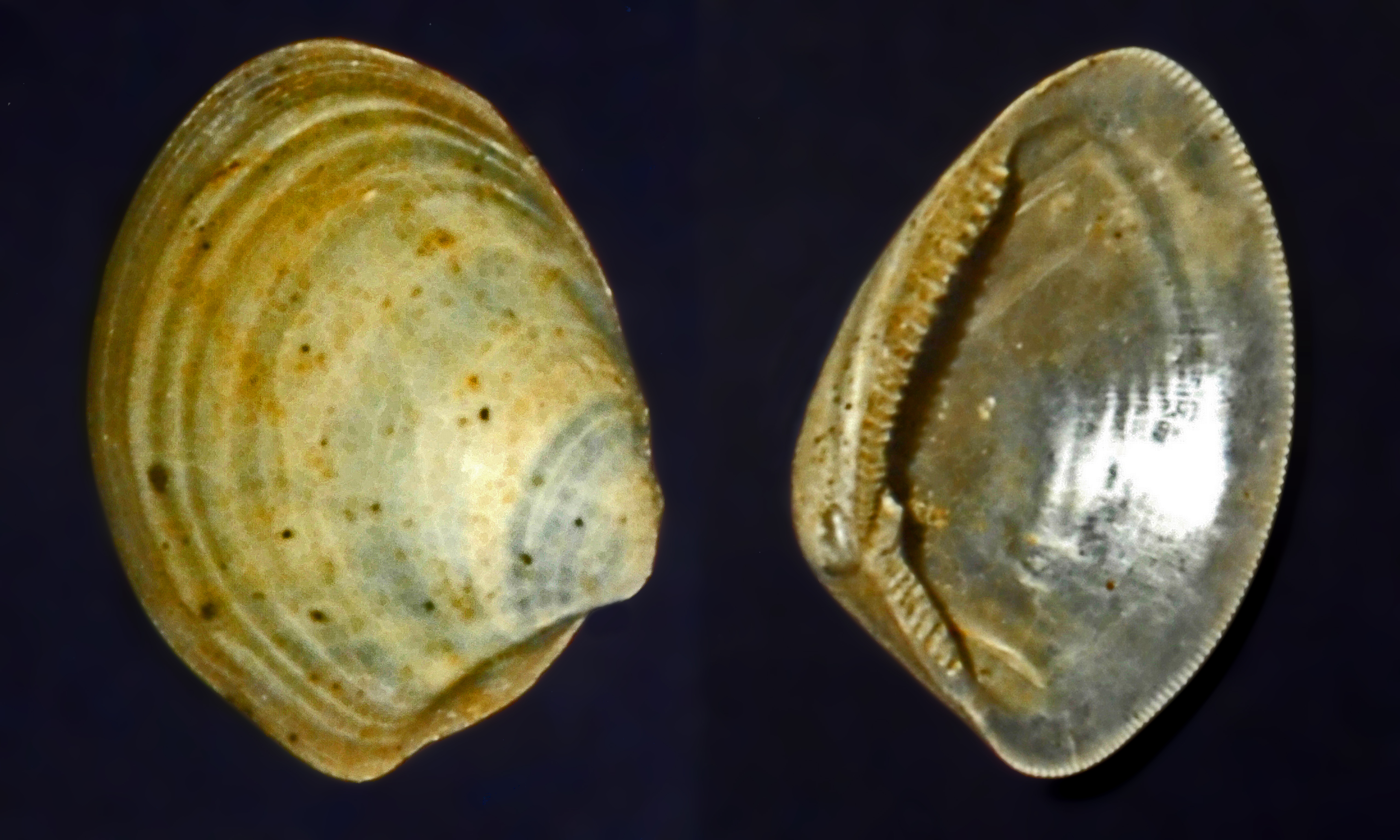
- Interior of a fossilized shell of the Early Ordovician-modern marine bivalve Nucula
  Nucula
  - †Nucula cancellata
  - †Nucula nacatochana
  - †Nucula planimarginata
- Nuculana
  - †Nuculana bisulcata
  - †Nuculana corsicana
  - †Nuculana equilateralis – tentative report
  - †Nuculana evansi
  - †Nuculana pittensis
- †Nymphaeites
  - †Nymphaeites dawsoni

== O ==
- †Obamadon
  - †Obamadon gracilis
- †Obnixia – type locality for genus
  - †Obnixia thaynesiana
- †Odaxosaurus – type locality for genus
  - †Odaxosaurus piger – type locality for species
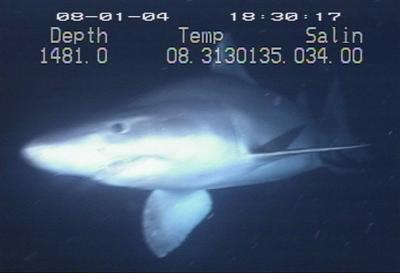
- A living Odontaspis sand shark
  Odontaspis
  - †Odontaspis cheathami – type locality for species
  - †Odontaspis steineri – type locality for species
- †Oklatheridium
  - †Oklatheridium wiblei
- †Oligoptycha
  - †Oligoptycha concinna
- †Omasaria
- †Onoclea
  - †Onoclea minima
- †Opertochasma
- †Ophiopsis
- †Ophthalmosaurus
  - †Ophthalmosaurus natans
- †Opisthias
  - †Opisthias rarus – type locality for species
- †Opisthotriton
  - †Opisthotriton kayi
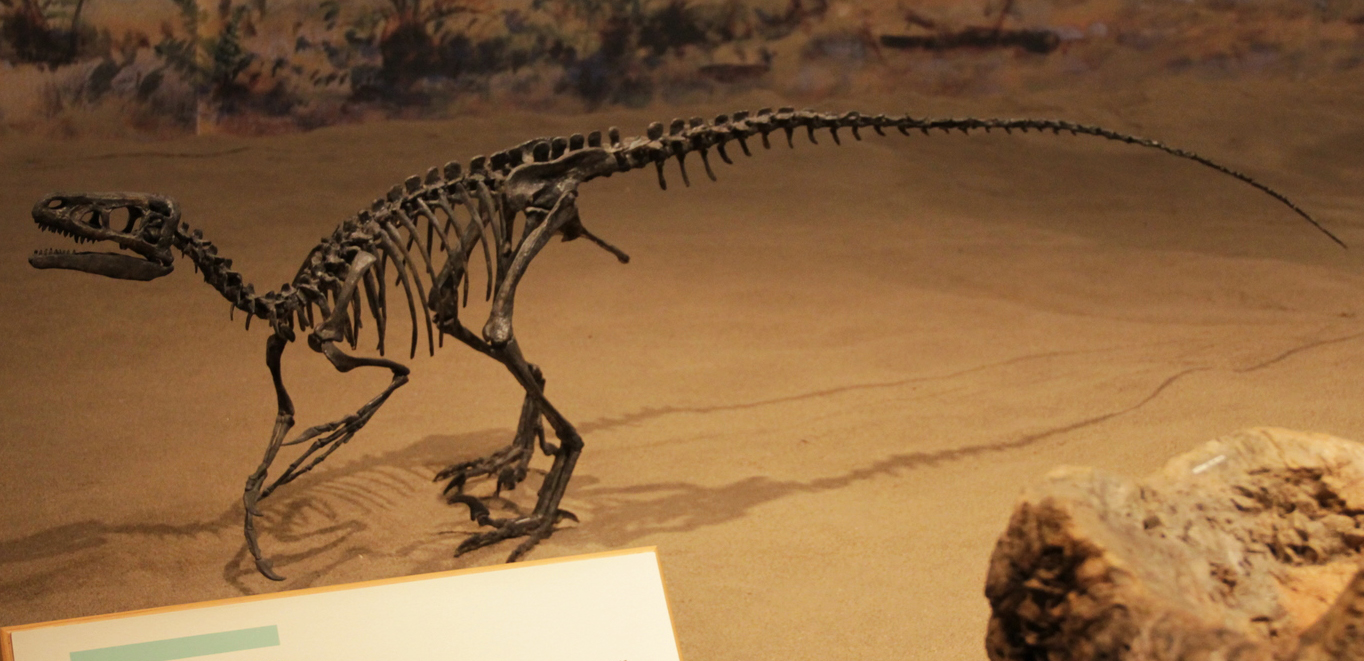
- Mounted fossilized skeleton of the Late Jurassic theropod dinosaur Ornitholestes
  †Ornitholestes – type locality for genus
  - †Ornitholestes hermanni – type locality for species
- †Ornithomimus
  - †Ornithomimus minutus
  - †Ornithomimus sedens – type locality for species
  - †Ornithomimus velox – or unidentified comparable form
- †Orthotrigonia
  - †Orthotrigonia sohli – tentative report
- †Osmakasaurus – tentative report
  - †Osmakasaurus depressus
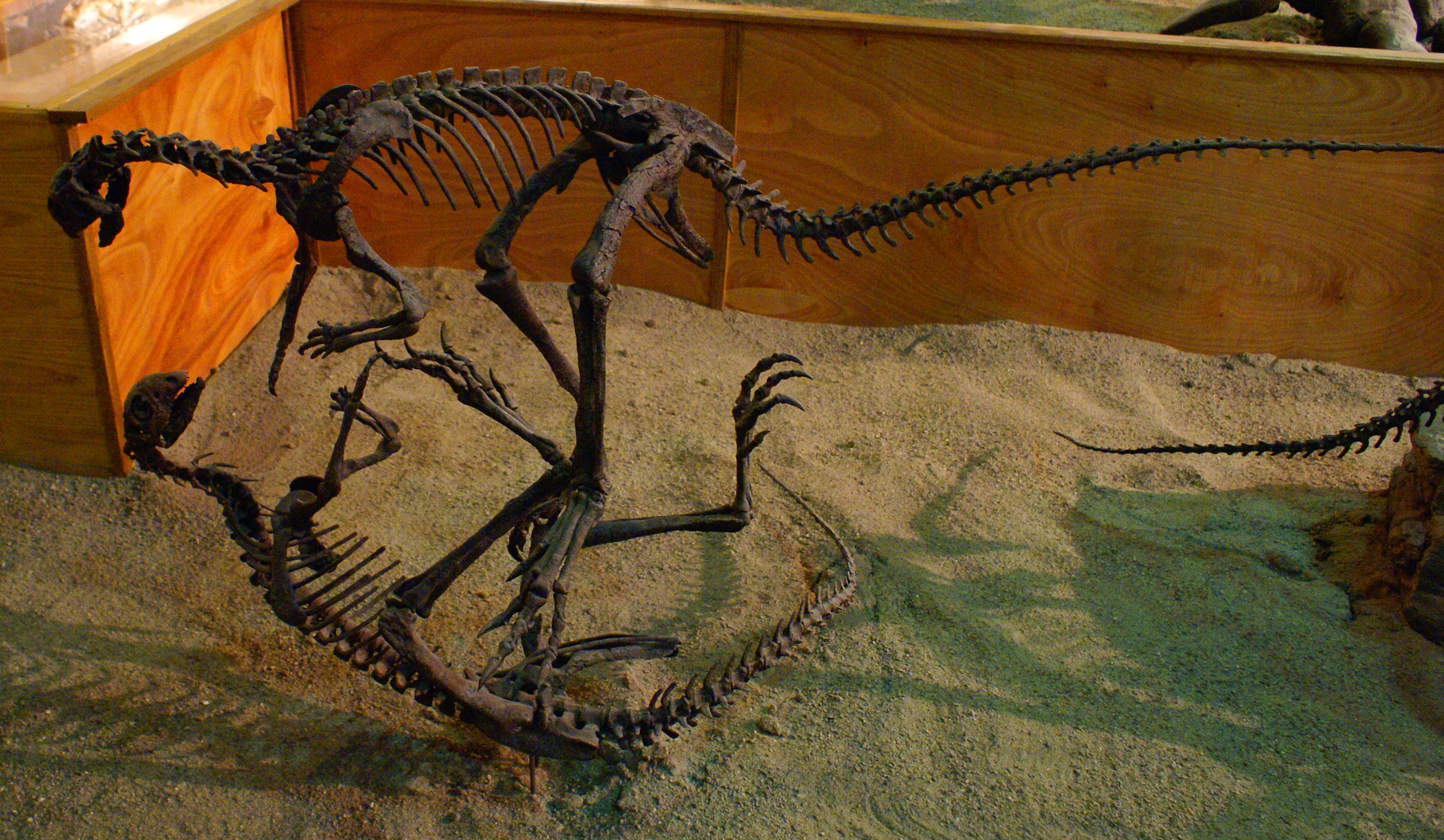
- Mounted fossilized skeleton of the Late Jurassic herbivorous dinosaur Othnielosaurus
  Ostrea
  - †Ostrea inornata
- †Othnielia
- †Othnielosaurus
  - †Othnielosaurus consors – type locality for species
- †Oxybeloceras
  - †Oxybeloceras crassum
- †Oxytoma
  - †Oxytoma nebrascana

== P ==
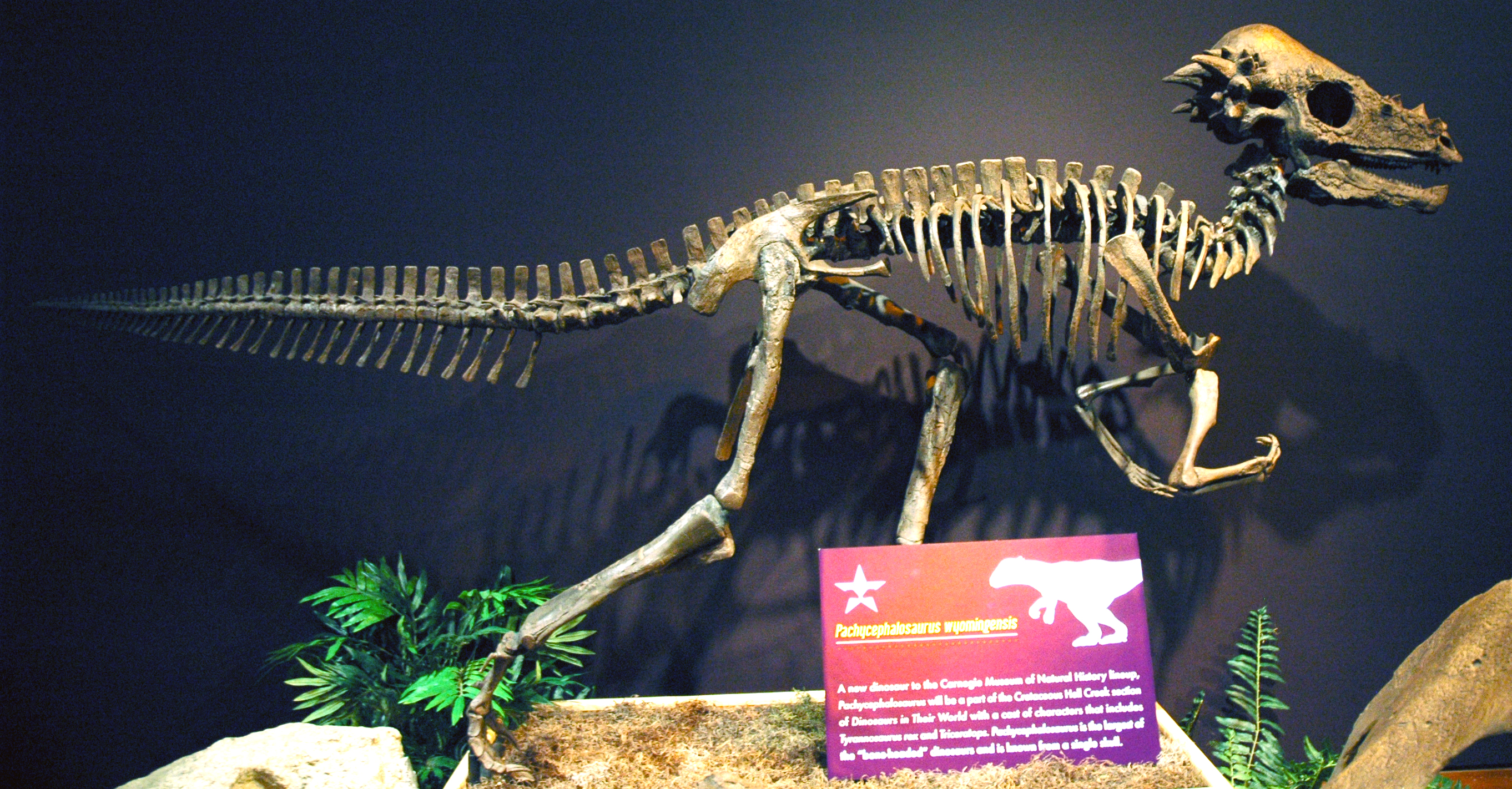
- Fossilized skeleton of the Late Cretaceous dome-headed dinosaur Pachycephalosaurus
  †Pachycephalosaurus
  - †Pachycephalosaurus wyomingensis – type locality for species
- †Pachyrhizodus
- †Pachyteuthis
  - †Pachyteuthis densus
- †Palaeoaster
  - †Palaeoaster inquirenda
- †Palaeobatrachus
  - †Palaeobatrachus occidentalis – type locality for species
- †Palaeocypraea
  - †Palaeocypraea squyeri – type locality for species
- †Palaeosaniwa – type locality for genus
  - †Palaeosaniwa canadensis – type locality for species
- †Paleoaster
  - †Paleoaster inquirenda
- †Paleopsephurus
  - †Paleopsephurus wilsoni
- †Paleorhinus
  - †Paleorhinus parvus – type locality for species
- †Paliurus
  - †Paliurus minimus
  - †Paliurus zizyphoides – tentative report
- †Pantosaurus – type locality for genus
  - †Pantosaurus striatus – type locality for species
- †Parachondroceras
  - †Parachondroceras andrewsi
  - †Parachondroceras filicostatum
- †Paracimexomys
  - †Paracimexomys priscus
- †Paracredneria
  - †Paracredneria cretacea – type locality for species
- †Paraderma – type locality for genus
  - †Paraderma bogerti – type locality for species
- †Paradiscoglossus – type locality for genus
  - †Paradiscoglossus americanus – type locality for species
- †Paralbula
  - †Paralbula casei
- †Paramacellodus
  - †Paramacellodus keebleri
- †Paranymphaea
  - †Paranymphaea hastata
- †Parasaniwa – type locality for genus
  - †Parasaniwa wyomingensis – type locality for species
- †Parastomechinus
  - †Parastomechinus brightoni
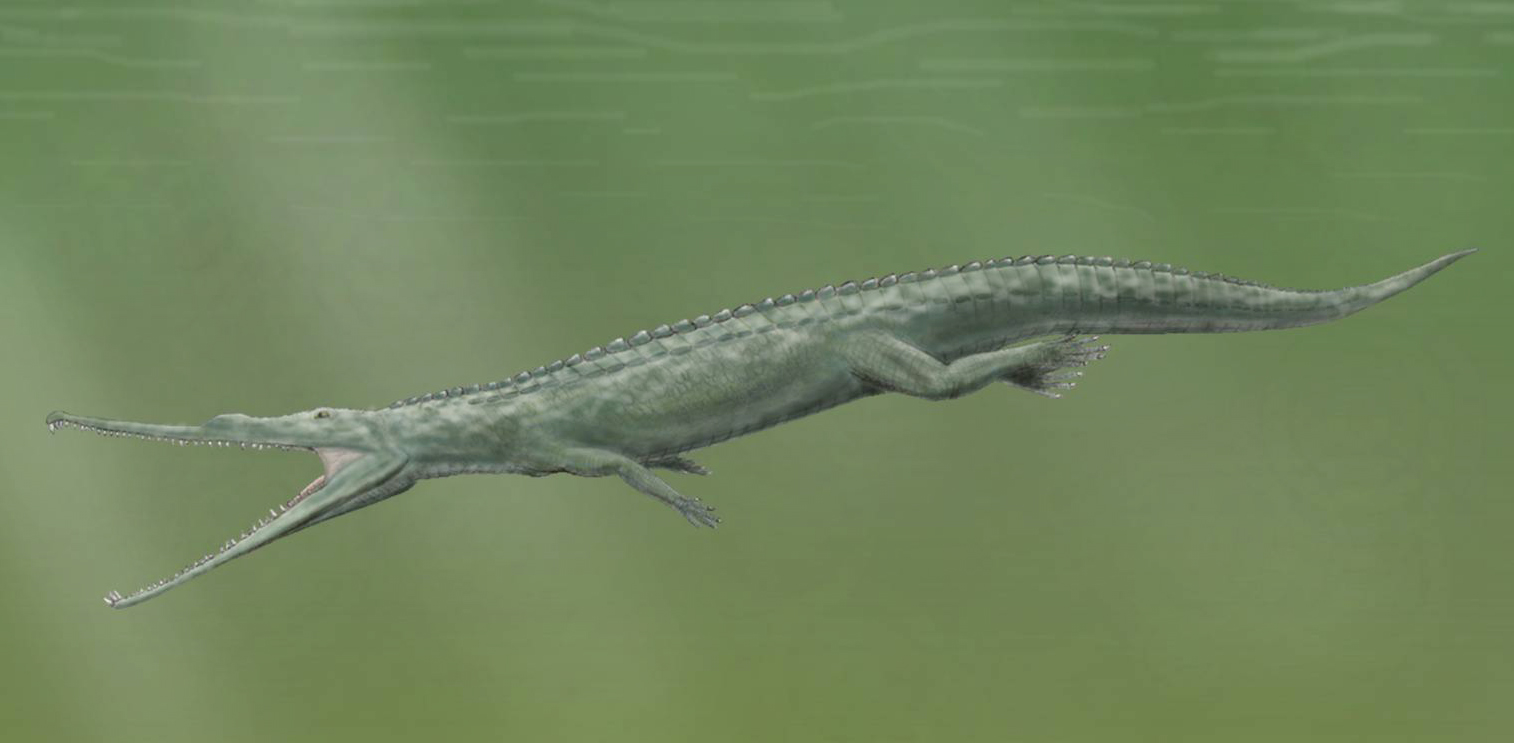
- Life restoration of the Late Triassic phytosaur Parasuchus
  †Parasuchus
  - †Parasuchus bransoni – type locality for species
- †Paressonodon
  - †Paressonodon nelsoni
- †Pariguana – type locality for genus
  - †Pariguana lancensis – type locality for species
- †Parikimys
  - †Parikimys carpenteri
- †Parmicorbula
  - †Parmicorbula bisulcata
- †Paronychodon
  - †Paronychodon lacustris – type locality for species
- †Parvodus
- †Paurodon – type locality for genus
  - †Paurodon valens – type locality for species
- †Pecopteris
  - †Pecopteris borealis
  - †Pecopteris Geyleriana
- Pecten
  - †Pecten nebrascensis
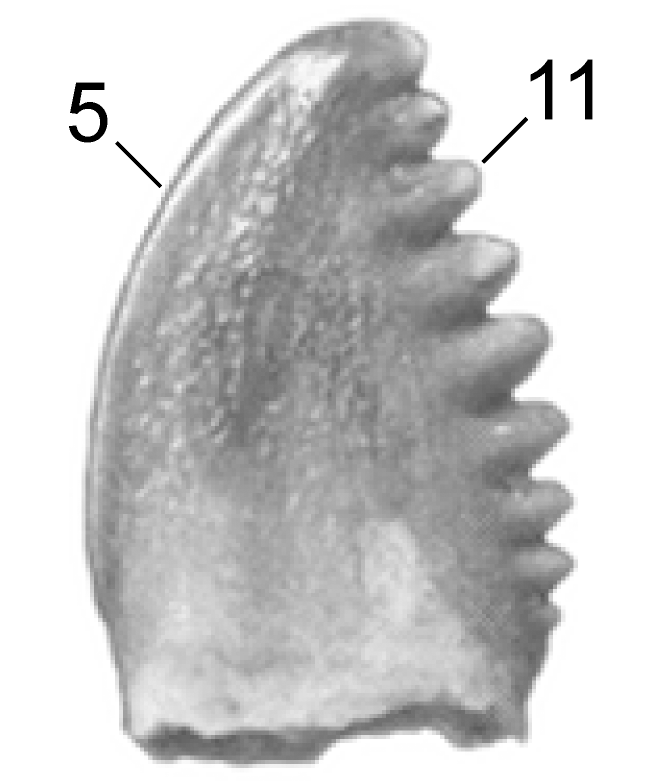
- Micrograph of a fossilized tooth of the Late Cretaceous troodontid Pectinodon
  †Pectinodon – type locality for genus
  - †Pectinodon bakkeri – type locality for species
- †Pediomys
  - †Pediomys elegans – type locality for species
- †Pentacrinus
- †Permophorus
  - †Permophorus triassicus – type locality for species
- Persea – report made of unidentified related form or using admittedly obsolete nomenclature
  - †Persea hayana
- †Petalolepis – tentative report
  - †Petalolepis fibrillatus
- †Phlycticrioceras
  - †Phlycticrioceras trinodosus
- †Phoenicites – or unidentified comparable form
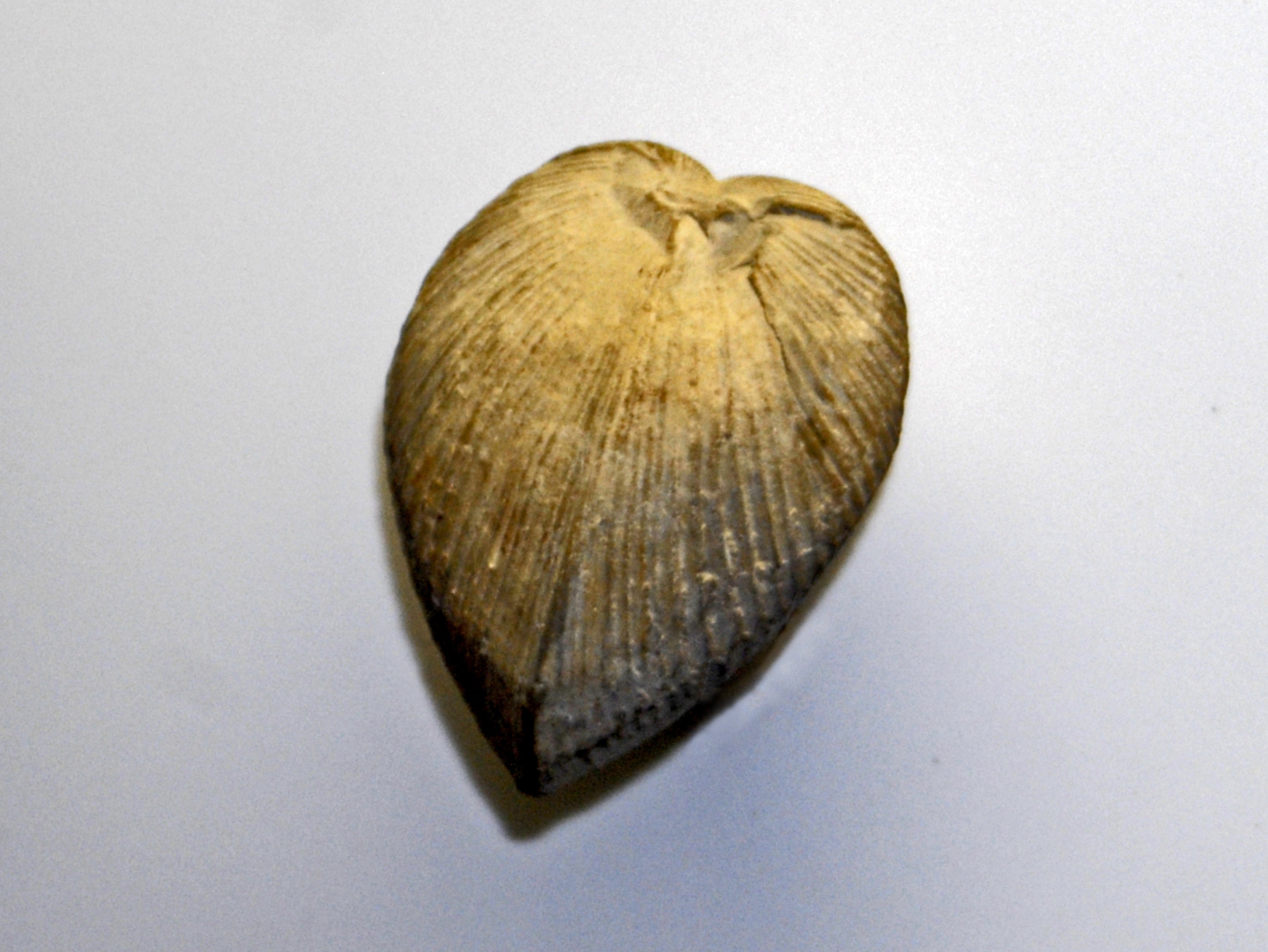
- Fossilized shell of the Early Triassic-Pliocene marine bivalve Pholadomya
  Pholadomya
  - †Pholadomya inaequiplicata
  - †Pholadomya kingi
- †Phragmites
  - †Phragmites falcata
- †Phyllites
  - †Phyllites crassipes
  - †Phyllites cretaceous
  - †Phyllites dentata
  - †Phyllites ficifolius
  - †Phyllites grandifolius-cretaceous
- Phyllodus
  - †Phyllodus toliapicus
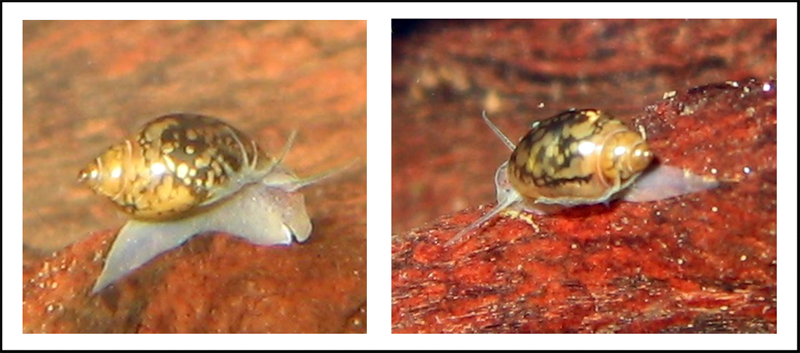
- A live individual of Physa marmorata
  Physa – or unidentified comparable form
- †Piceoerpeton
  - †Piceoerpeton naylori
- Pinna
  - †Pinna kingi
- Pinus
  - †Pinus susquaensis
- Pistacia
  - †Pistacia eriensis
- †Pistia
  - †Pistia corrugata
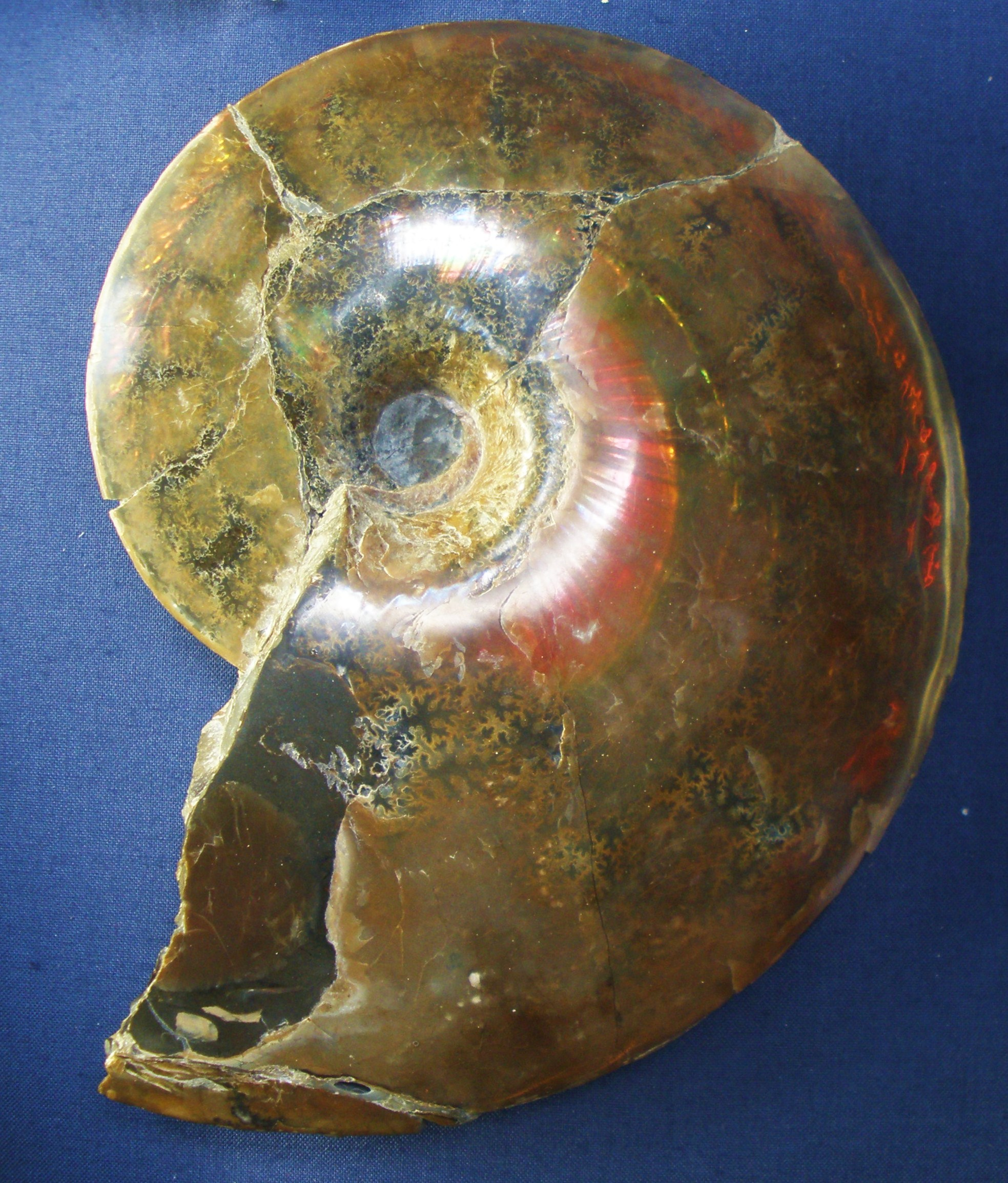
- Fossilized shell of the Late Cretaceous ammonoid cephalopod Placenticeras
  †Placenticeras
  - †Placenticeras intercalare
  - †Placenticeras meeki
  - †Placenticeras pseudoplacenta
- †Plagiostoma
  - †Plagiostoma occidentalis
- Planorbis
- †Plastomenus
- †Platacodon – type locality for genus
  - †Platacodon nanus – type locality for species
- †Platanites
  - †Platanites marginata
- †Platanophyllum
  - †Platanophyllum montanum
  - †Platanophyllum platanoides
- Platanus
  - †Platanus primaeva
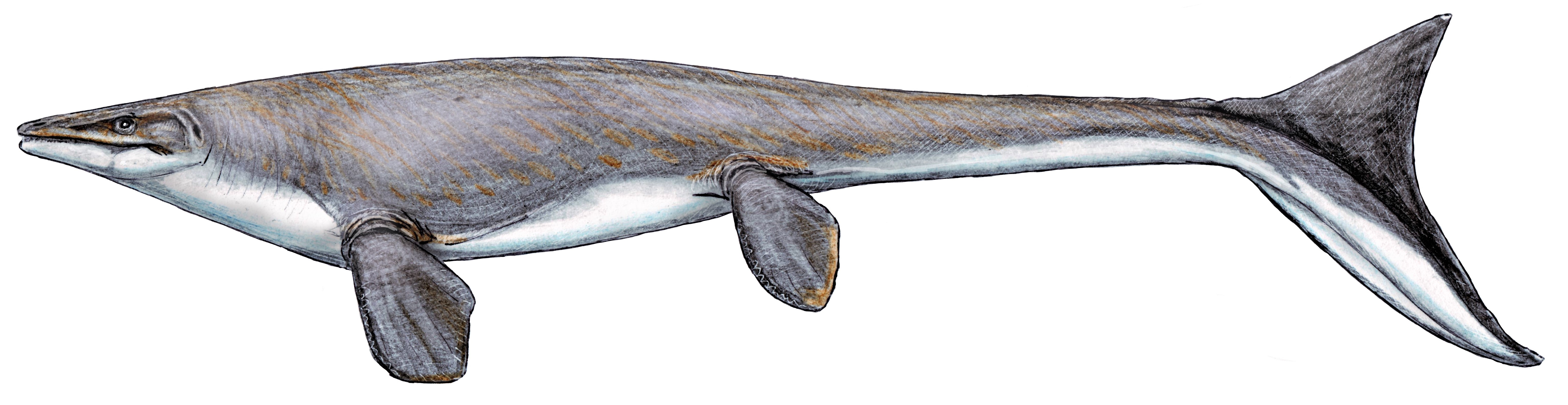
- Life restoration of the Late Cretaceous mosasaur Platecarpus
  †Platecarpus
  - †Platecarpus brachycephalus
  - †Platecarpus tympaniticus
- †Platymya
  - †Platymya rockymontana
- †Platypterygius
  - †Platypterygius americanus – type locality for species
- †Plesiacanthoceras
  - †Plesiacanthoceras bellsanum – or unidentified comparable form
  - †Plesiacanthoceras wyomingense
- †Plesiobaena
  - †Plesiobaena antiqua
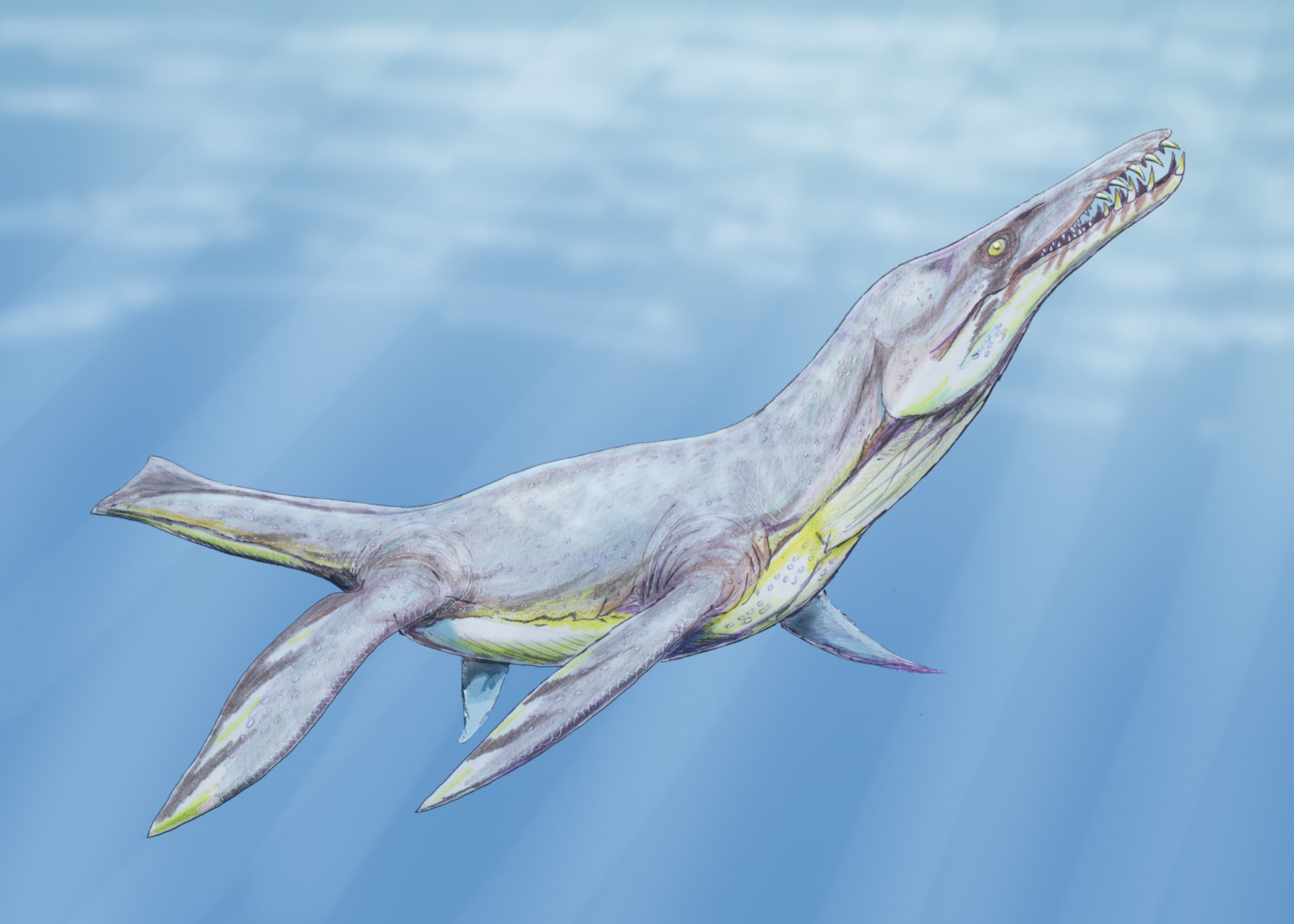
- Life restoration of the Late Cretaceous plesiosaur Plesiopleurodon
  †Plesiopleurodon – type locality for genus
  - †Plesiopleurodon wellesi – type locality for species
- †Plesiosaurus
  - †Plesiosaurus shirleyensis – type locality for species
- †Pleuromya
  - †Pleuromya haydeniana – type locality for species
  - †Pleuromya subcompressa
- †Plicatolamna
  - †Plicatolamna arcuata
- Plicatula
- Polinices
  - †Polinices concinna – or unidentified related form
- †Polyacrodus
  - †Polyacrodus parvidens – or unidentified comparable form
- †Polycotylus
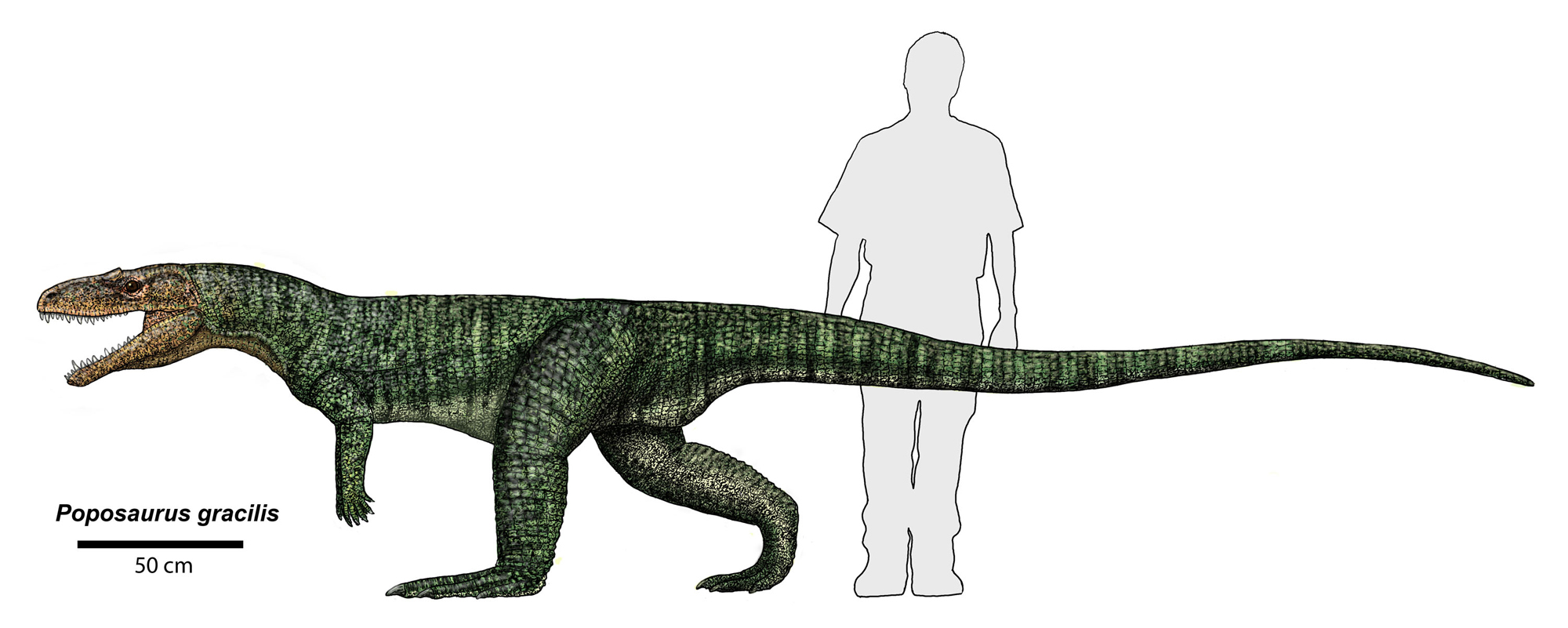
- Restoration of the Late Triassic crocodile relative Poposaurus with an anachronistic human to scale
  †Poposaurus – type locality for genus
  - †Poposaurus gracilis – type locality for species
- Populus
  - †Populus aspens
  - †Populus aspensis – type locality for species
- †Porosoma
  - †Porosoma reesidei – type locality for species
- †Portheus
- †Postligata
  - †Postligata crenata
- †Potamoceratodus
- †Potamornis – type locality for genus
  - †Potamornis skutchi – type locality for species
- †Powellia – type locality for genus
  - †Powellia oblongata – type locality for species
- †Priacodon
  - †Priacodon ferox – type locality for species
  - †Priacodon grandaevus – type locality for species
  - †Priacodon lulli – type locality for species
  - †Priacodon robustus – type locality for species
- †Prionocyclus
  - †Prionocyclus germari
  - †Prionocyclus hyatti
  - †Prionocyclus novimexicanus
- †Prodesmodon – type locality for genus
  - †Prodesmodon copei – type locality for species
- †Prodiplocynodon – type locality for genus
  - †Prodiplocynodon langi – type locality for species
- †Promyalina
  - †Promyalina putiatinensis
  - †Promyalina spathi
- †Pronoella
  - †Pronoella cinnabarensis
  - †Pronoella iddingsi – or unidentified comparable form
  - †Pronoella uintahensis
- †Prorokia
  - †Prorokia fontenellensis
- †Protalphadon
  - †Protalphadon lulli – type locality for species
- †Protexanites
  - †Protexanites bourgeoisianus
- †Protocardia
  - †Protocardia rara
  - †Protocardia schucherti – or unidentified comparable form
- †Protolambda
  - †Protolambda florencae – type locality for species
  - †Protolambda hatcheri
- †Protophyllocladus
  - †Protophyllocladus subintegrifolius
- †Protophyllum
- †Protoplatyrhina
  - †Protoplatyrhina renae
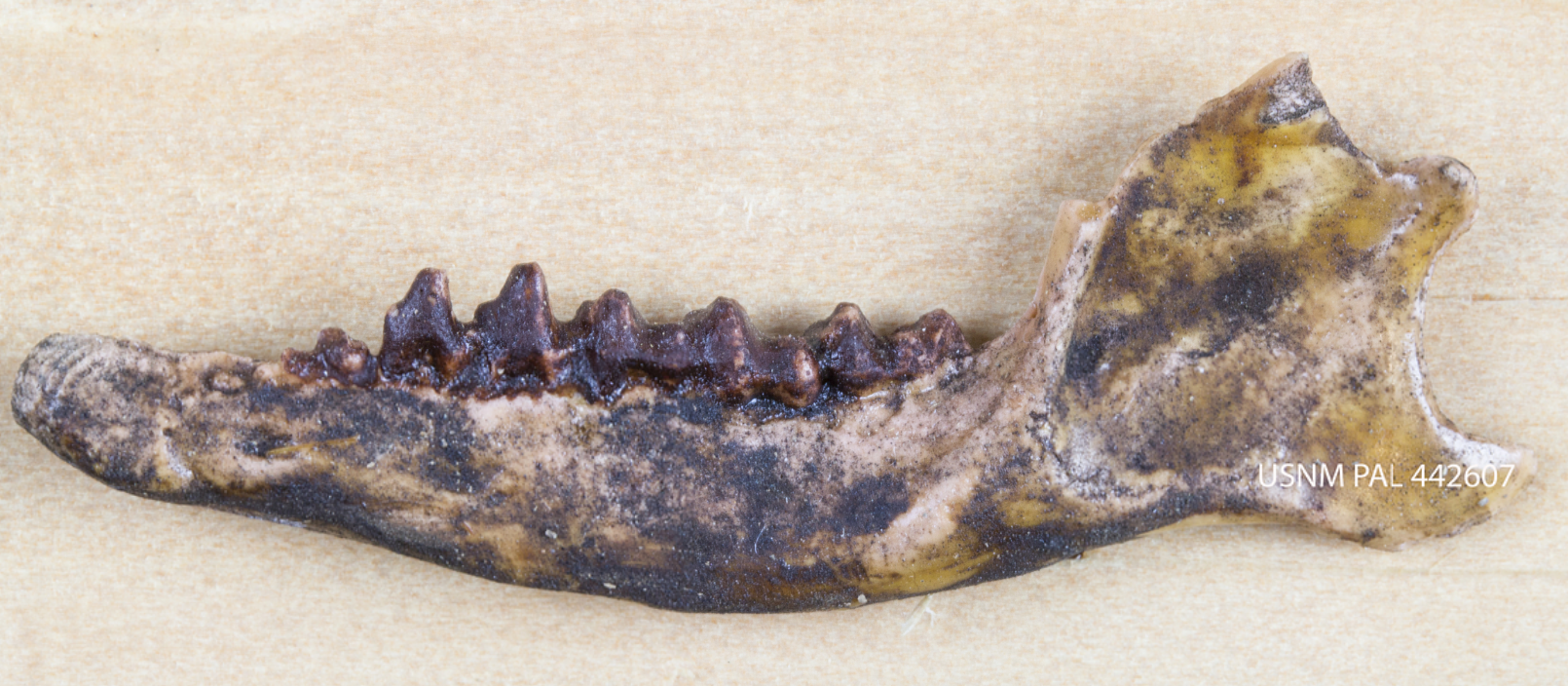
- Fossilized mandible of the Late Cretaceous-Paleocene mammal Protungulatum
  †Protungulatum – tentative report
- Prunus
  - †Prunus aspensis – type locality for species
- †Psalodon
  - †Psalodon fortis – type locality for species
  - †Psalodon marshi – type locality for species
  - †Psalodon potens – type locality for species
- †Pseudoctenis
  - †Pseudoctenis AF013 – informal
- †Pseudodontaspis – type locality for genus
  - †Pseudodontaspis herbsti – type locality for species
- †Pseudoperna
  - †Pseudoperna congesta
- †Pteraichnus
  - †Pteraichnus stokesi – type locality for species
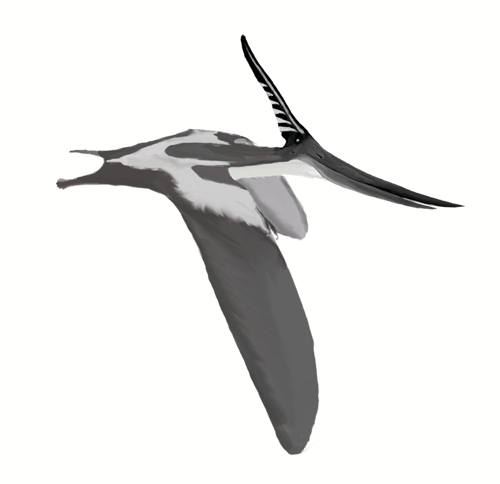
- Life restoration of the Late Cretaceous pterosaur Pteranodon
  †Pteranodon
  - †Pteranodon longiceps
- †Pteria
  - †Pteria gastrodes
  - †Pteria linguaeformis
  - †Pteria linguiformis
  - †Pteria lingulaeformis
  - †Pteria ussurica – or unidentified comparable form
- †Pterodactylus
  - †Pterodactylus montanus – type locality for species
- †Ptilotodon
  - †Ptilotodon wilsoni
- †Ptychodous
- †Ptychotrygon
  - †Ptychotrygon boothi – type locality for species
  - †Ptychotrygon ellae – type locality for species
  - †Ptychotrygon greybullensis – type locality for species

== Q ==
- †Quenstedtia
  - †Quenstedtia sublevis
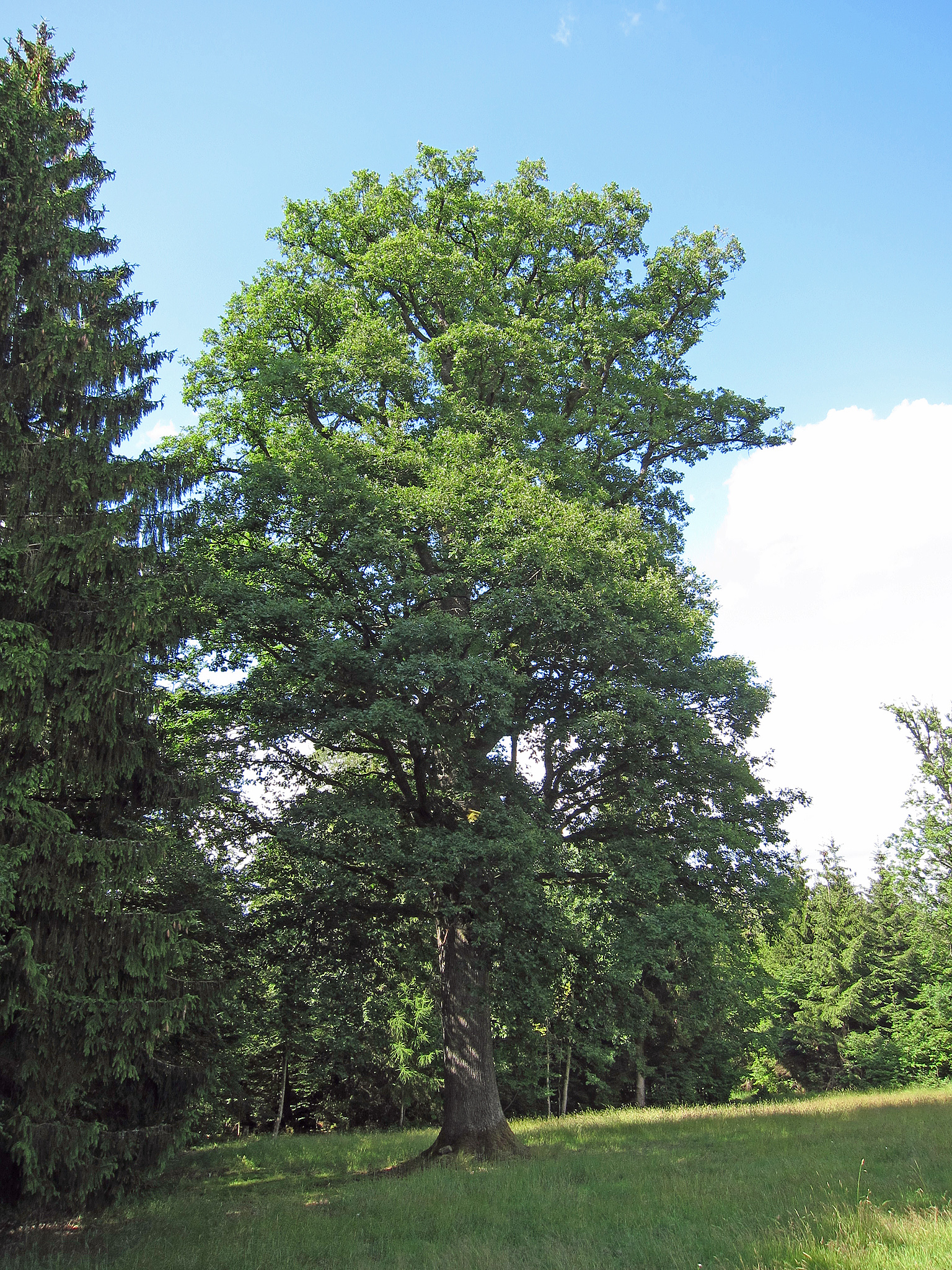
  - A living Quercus, or oak tree
    †Quenstedtia sublewis
- †Quercophyllum
  - †Quercophyllum gardneri
  - †Quercophyllum wyomingense – type locality for species
- Quercus
  - †Quercus ellisiana
  - †Quercus stantoni
  - †Quercus stantonii
  - †Quercus viburnifolia
- †Quereuxia
  - †Quereuxia angulata

== R ==
- †Raninella
- †Reesidella
- †Retinovena – type locality for genus
  - †Retinovena fluvialis – type locality for species
- †Retispira
  - †Retispira bittneri
- Rhabdocolpus – tentative report
- †Rhaeboceras
  - †Rhaeboceras halli
  - †Rhaeboceras subglobosum
- †Rhamnus
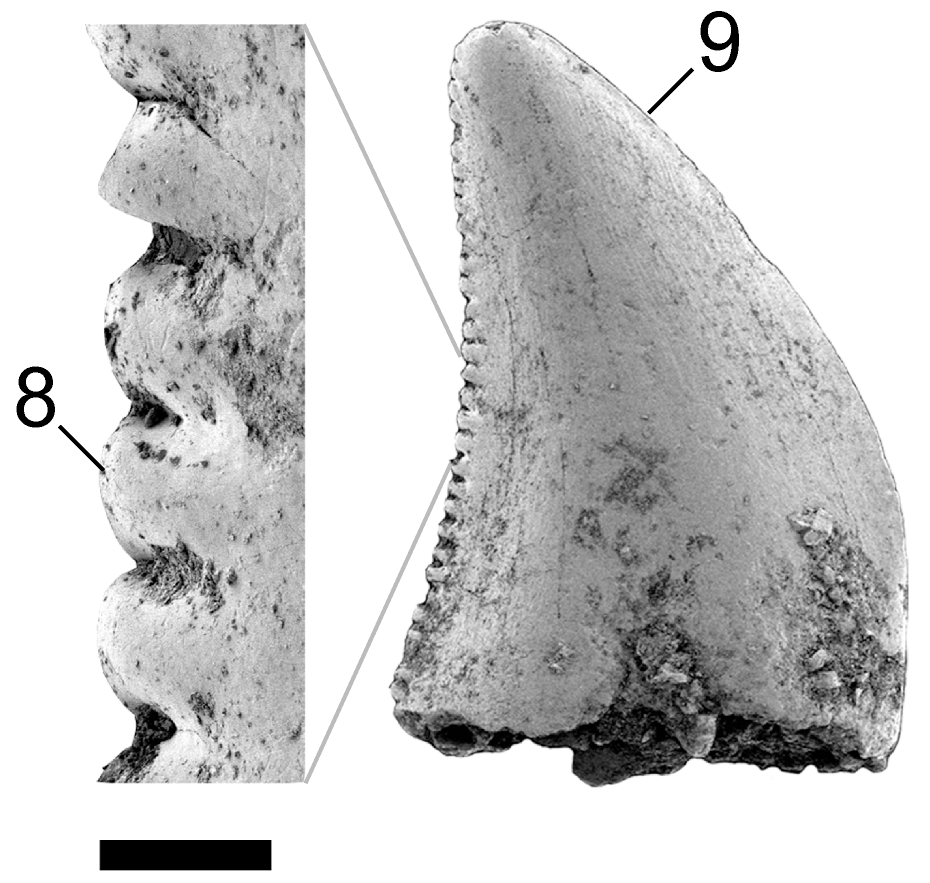
  - Micrograph with magnified inset of a fossilized tooth of the Late Cretaceous theropod dinosaur Richardoestesia
    †Rhamnus hirsuta
  - †Rhamnus minutus
- Rhinobatos
  - †Rhinobatos casieri
- †Rhizocorallium
- †Rhynchosauroides – type locality for genus
  - †Rhynchosauroides palmatus – type locality for species
- †Richardoestesia
  - †Richardoestesia isosceles
- †Ropalonaria
  - †Ropalonaria arachne
- Rostellaria – tentative report
- †Rotodactylus – or unidentified comparable form

== S ==
- †Sabalites
  - †Sabalites eocenica
  - †Sabalites montana
- †Saccoloma – report made of unidentified related form or using admittedly obsolete nomenclature
  - †Saccoloma gardneri
- †Saliciphyllum
  - †Saliciphyllum wyomingensis
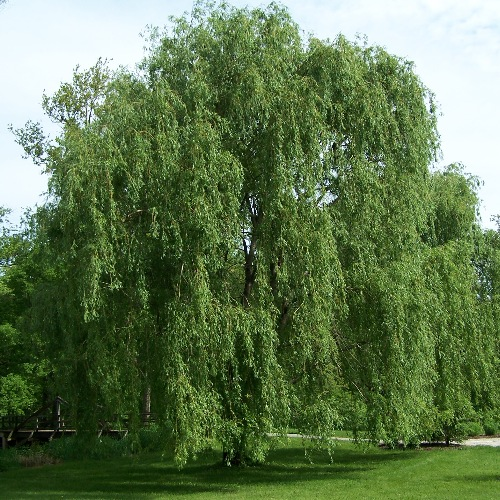
- A living Salix, or willow
  Salix
  - †Salix cumberlandensis
  - †Salix frontierensis
  - †Salix lancensis
- †Salpichlaena
  - †Salpichlaena AF003 – informal
- †Sapindopsis
  - †Sapindopsis belviderensis
  - †Sapindopsis magnifolia
  - †Sapindopsis schultzi – type locality for species
  - †Sapindopsis schultzii
  - †Sapindopsis variabilis
- †Sarjeantopodus – type locality for genus
  - †Sarjeantopodus semipalmatus – type locality for species
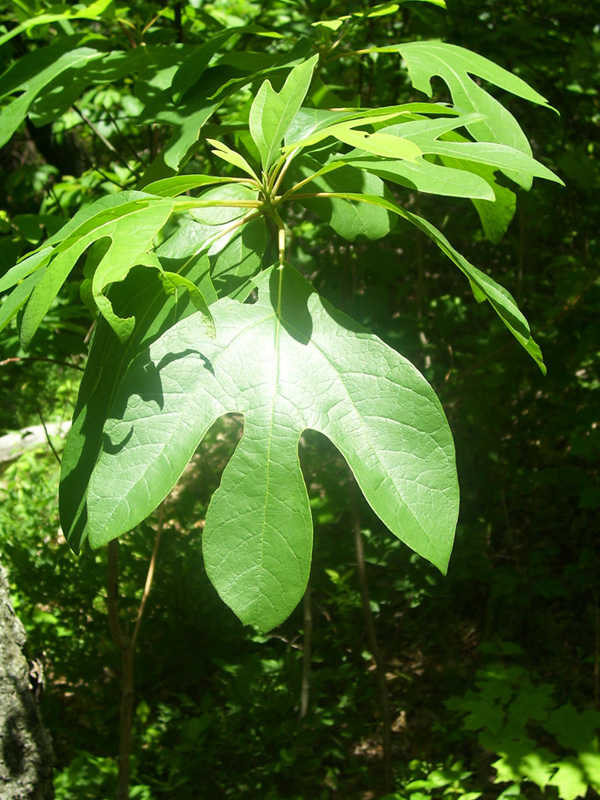
- Foliage of a living Sassafras tree
  Sassafras
  - †Sassafras bradleyi – type locality for species
  - †Sassafras bradleyii
  - †Sassafras thermale
- †Saurexallopus – type locality for genus
  - †Saurexallopus lovei – type locality for species
  - †Saurexallopus zerbsti – type locality for species
- †Saurocephalus
- †Saurolophus
- †Sauropelta
  - †Sauropelta edwardsorum
- Diagram illustrating the Early Cretaceous long-necked dinosaur Sauroposeidon with anachronistic humans to scale
  †Sauroposeidon
  - †Sauroposeidon proteles
- †Saurornithoides – or unidentified comparable form
- †Saurornitholestes
- †Sauvagesia
  - †Sauvagesia austinensis – or unidentified comparable form
- †Scapanorhynchus
  - †Scapanorhynchus texanus
- †Scapherpeton
  - †Scapherpeton tectum
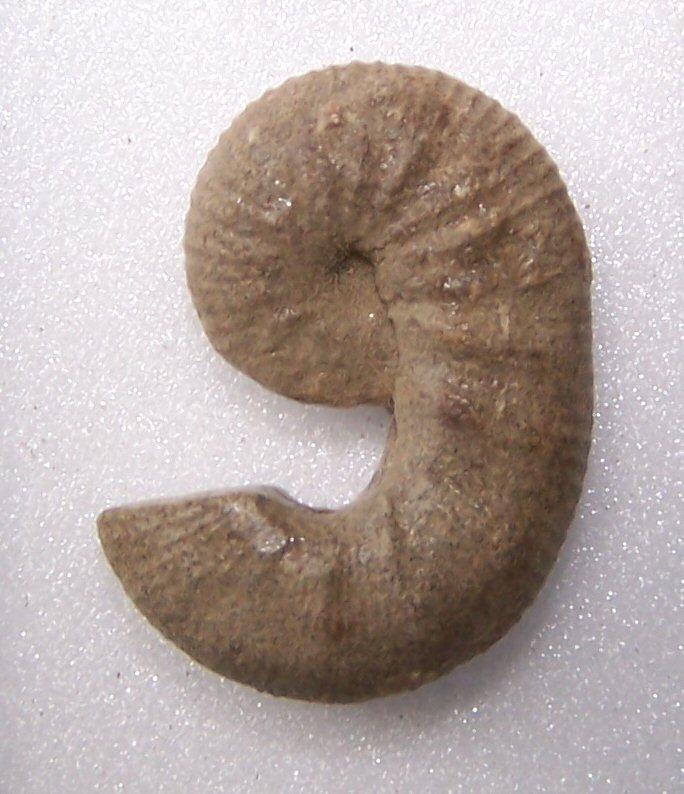
- Fossilized shell of the Late Cretaceous ammonoid cephalopod Scaphites
  †Scaphites
  - †Scaphites aquilaensis
  - †Scaphites binneyi
  - †Scaphites hippocrepis
  - †Scaphites stantoni
  - †Scaphites ventricosus
  - †Scaphites whitfieldi
- †Scleropteris
  - †Scleropteris distantifolia – type locality for species
  - †Scleropteris rotundifolia – type locality for species
- †Scotiophryne
  - †Scotiophryne pustulosa
- Scyliorhinus
  - †Scyliorhinus tensleepensis – type locality for species
- †Selaginella
  - †Selaginella falcata – tentative report
- †Semiungula – type locality for genus
  - †Semiungula assymetrica – type locality for species
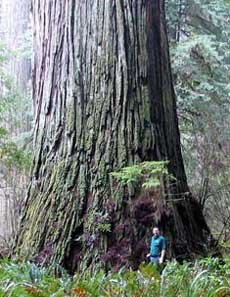
- Base of the trunk of a living Sequoia tree with a human to scale
  Sequoia
  - †Sequoia cuneata
  - †Sequoia dakotensis
  - †Sequoia gracilia
  - †Sequoia gracilis
  - †Sequoia langsdorfii
  - †Sequoia reichenbachi
  - †Sequoia Reichenbachi
- †Serrifusus
  - †Serrifusus dakotensis
- †Skolithos
- †Smilax
  - †Smilax coloradensis – tentative report
- †Socognathus
  - †Socognathus brachyodon – type locality for species
- †Sohlites
  - †Sohlites spinosus
- †Sokophyllum – type locality for genus
  - †Sokophyllum dentatum – type locality for species
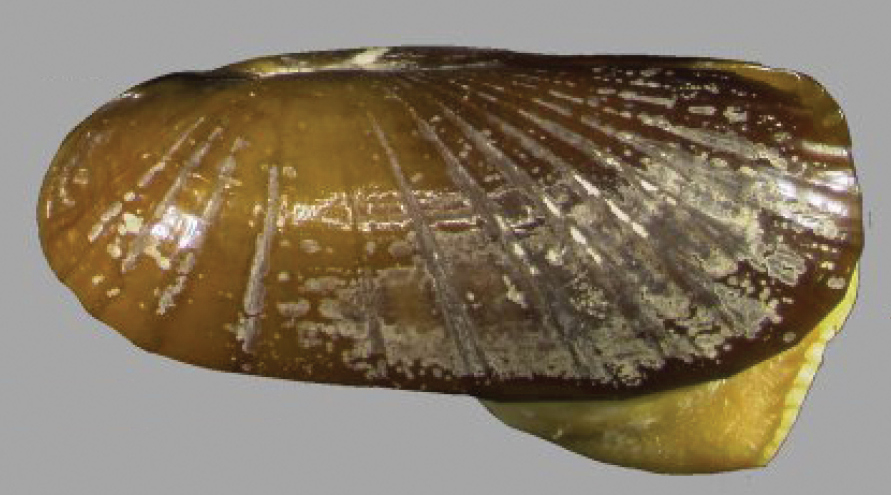
- Modern specimen of the marine bivalve Solemya
  Solemya
  - †Solemya bilix
  - †Solemya obscura
- †Solenoceras
- †Solyma
- †Sparganium
  - †Sparganium aspens
  - †Sparganium aspensis – type locality for species
- Sphaerium – or unidentified comparable form
- †Sphenodiscus
  - †Sphenodiscus lobatus – or unidentified comparable form
  - †Sphenodiscus pleurisepta
- †Sphenolepidium
  - †Sphenolepidium Kurrianum
  - †Sphenolepidium parceramosum
- †Sphenopteris
  - †Sphenopteris plurinervia
- †Spiroceras
  - †Spiroceras orbignyi – or unidentified comparable form
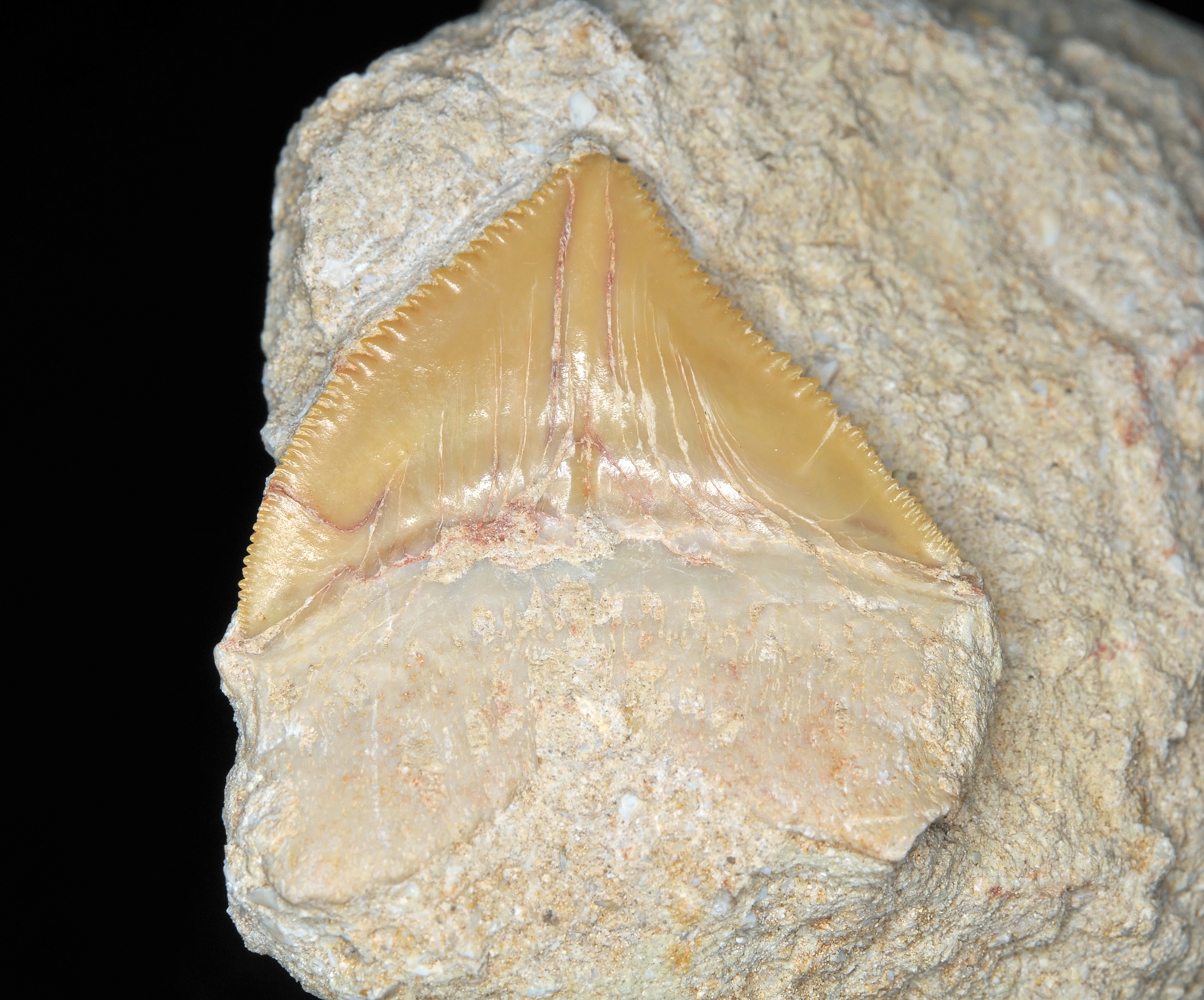
- Fossilized tooth of the Late Cretaceous shark Squalicorax
  Squalicorax
  - †Squalicorax kaupi
  - †Squalicorax pristodontus
- †Squatirhina
  - †Squatirhina americana – type locality for species
  - †Squatirhina roessingi – type locality for species
- †Staphylea
  - †Staphylea fremonti
  - †Staphylea fremontii
- †Stegopelta – type locality for genus
  - †Stegopelta landerensis – type locality for species
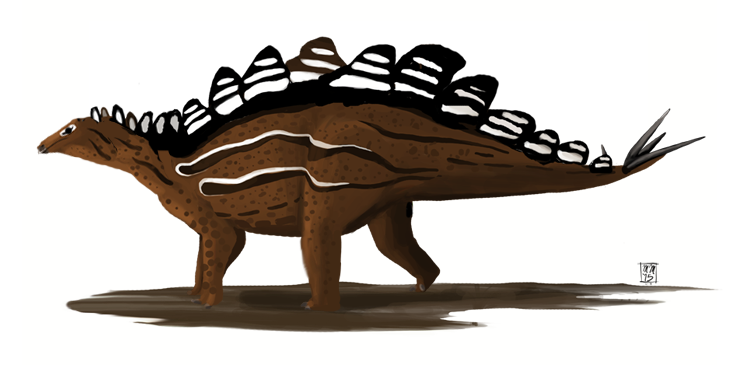
- Restoration of the Late Jurassic stegosaur Stegosaurus
  †Stegosaurus – type locality for genus
  - †Stegosaurus affinis – type locality for species
  - †Stegosaurus armatus – type locality for species
  - †Stegosaurus longispinus – type locality for species
  - †Stegosaurus stenops
  - †Stegosaurus sulcatus – type locality for species
  - †Stegosaurus ungulatus – type locality for species
- †Steinichnus
- †Stemmatoceras
  - †Stemmatoceras albertense – or unidentified related form
- Sterculia
  - †Sterculia mucronata
  - †Sterculia towneri
- †Stokesosaurus – tentative report
  - †Stokesosaurus clevelandi
- †Struthiomimus – or unidentified comparable form
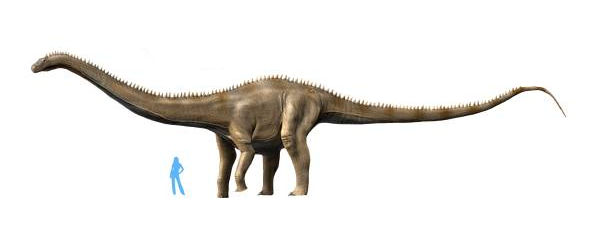
- Restoration in multiple views of the Late Jurassic sauropod dinosaur Supersaurus with an anachronistic human to scale
  †Stygiochelys
- †Styxosaurus
  - †Styxosaurus browni – type locality for species
- †Supersaurus
  - †Supersaurus vivianae
- †Syncyclonema
  - †Syncyclonema rigida
- †Synechodus
  - †Synechodus turneri – type locality for species

== T ==
- †Tancredia
  - †Tancredia transversa
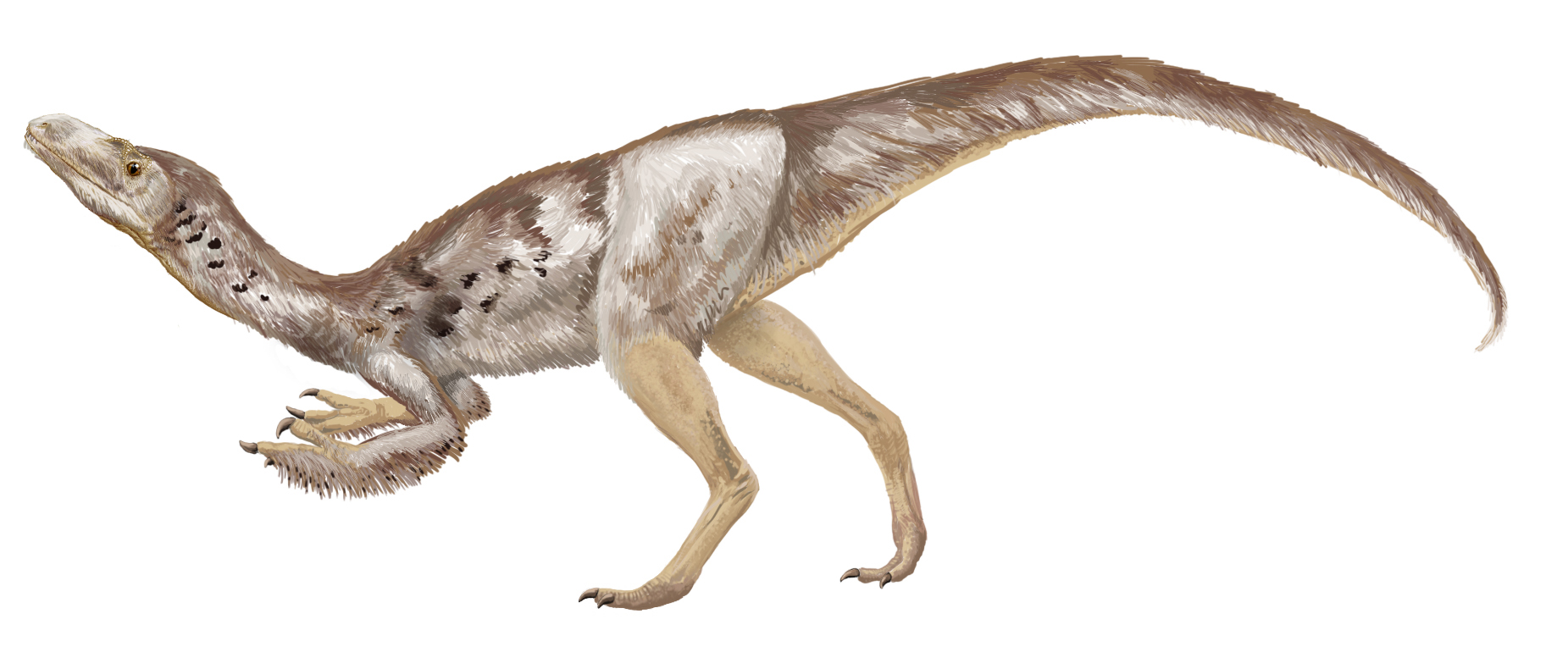
- Life restoration of the Late Jurassic theropod dinosaur Tanycolagreus
  †Tanycolagreus – type locality for genus
  - †Tanycolagreus topwilsoni – type locality for species
- Tapeinidium
  - Tapeinidium undulatum – tentative report
- †Tarrantoceras
  - †Tarrantoceras exile – type locality for species
  - †Tarrantoceras flexicostatum – type locality for species
  - †Tarrantoceras sellardsi
- †Tatenectes
  - †Tatenectes laramiensis – type locality for species
- †Tathiodon – type locality for genus
  - †Tathiodon agilis – type locality for species
- †Telacodon
  - †Telacodon laevis – type locality for species
- †Tenea
  - †Tenea circularis
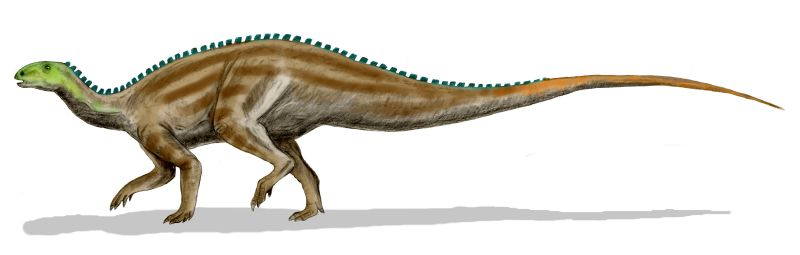
- Life restoration of the Early Cretaceous Iguanodon relative Tenontosaurus
  †Tenontosaurus
  - †Tenontosaurus tilletti
- Teredo
- †Thalassinoides
- †Theatonius – type locality for genus
  - †Theatonius lancensis – type locality for species
- †Theretairus – type locality for genus
  - †Theretairus antiquus – type locality for species
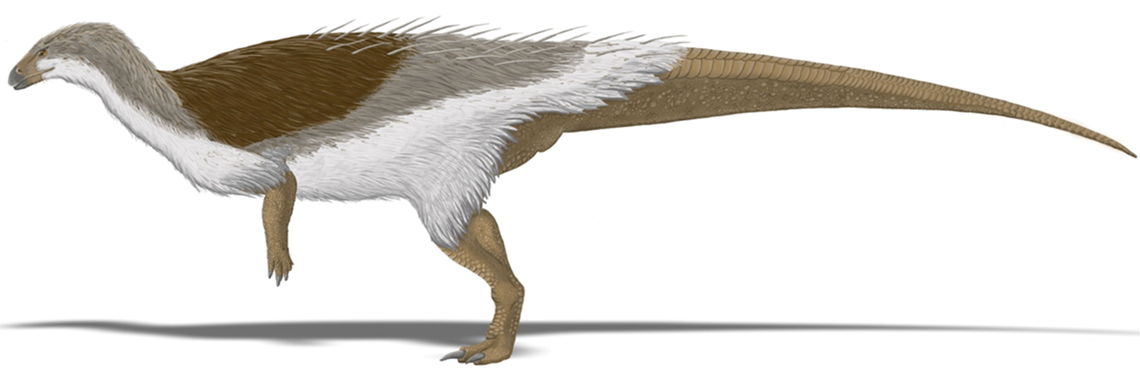
- Life restoration of the Late Cretaceous herbivorous dinosaur Thescelosaurus
  †Thescelosaurus – type locality for genus
  - †Thescelosaurus neglectus – type locality for species
- †Thescelus
  - †Thescelus insiliens – type locality for species
- †Thoracosaurus – or unidentified comparable form
- Thracia
  - †Thracia weedi
- Thyasira
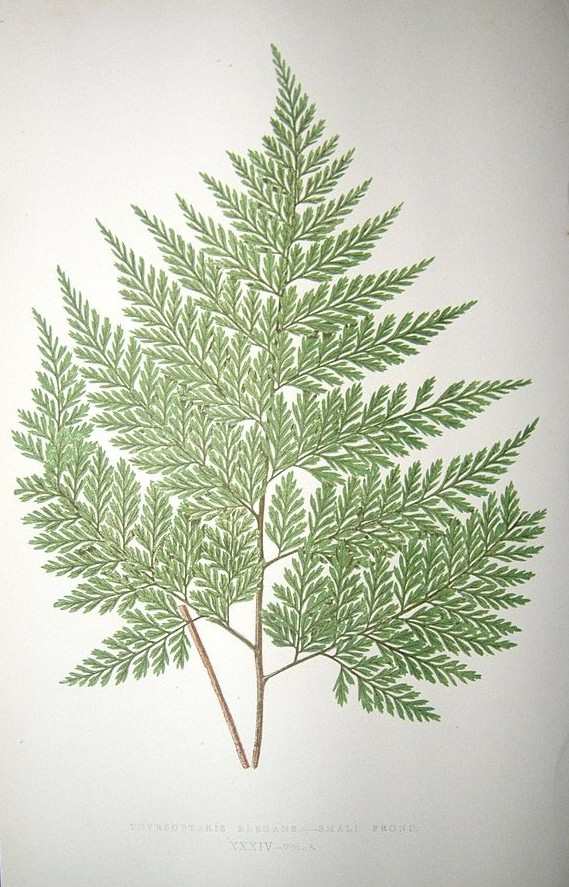
- Illustration of a living Thyrsopteris tree fern
  †Thyrsopteris
  - †Thyrsopteris brevifolia
  - †Thyrsopteris brevipennis
  - †Thyrsopteris crassinervis
  - †Thyrsopteris dentifolia – type locality for species
  - †Thyrsopteris elliptica
  - †Thyrsopteris pecopteroides
  - †Thyrsopteris pinnatifida
- †Tinodon – type locality for genus
  - †Tinodon bellus – type locality for species
- †Torosaurus – type locality for genus
  - †Torosaurus latus – type locality for species
- †Torotix – type locality for genus
  - †Torotix clemensi – type locality for species
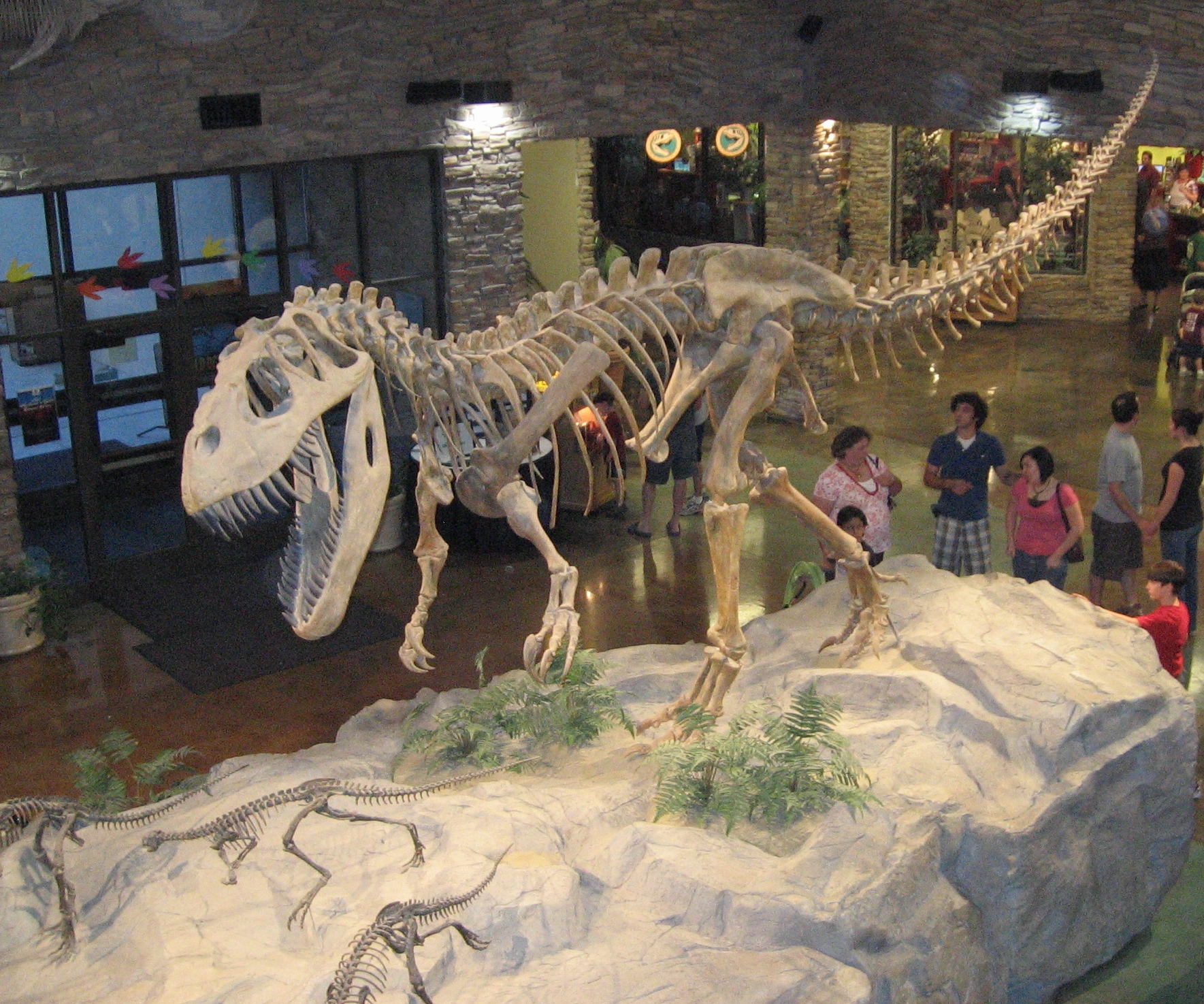
- Mounted fossilized skeleton of the Late Jurassic megalosaur Torvosaurus
  †Torvosaurus – type locality for genus
  - †Torvosaurus tanneri – type locality for species
- †Trachodon
- †Trachyscaphites
  - †Trachyscaphites redbirdensis
- †Trachytriton
  - †Trachytriton vinculum
- †Tragodesmoceras
  - †Tragodesmoceras carlilense
- †Trapa
  - †Trapa microphylla
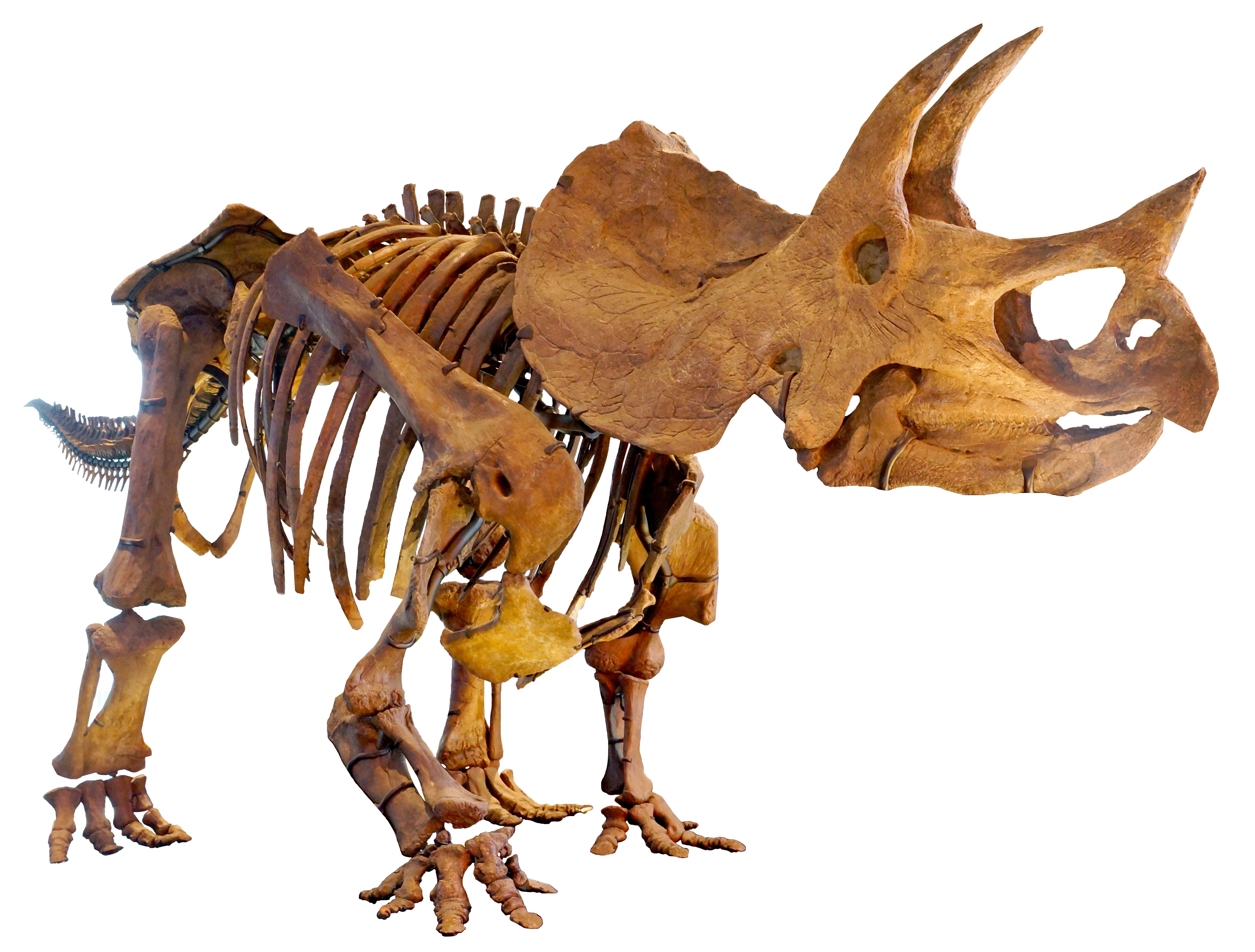
- Mounted fossilized skeleton of the Late Cretaceous horned dinosaur Triceratops
  †Triceratops – type locality for genus
  - †Triceratops horridus – type locality for species
  - †Triceratops ingens – type locality for species
  - †Triceratops prorsus – type locality for species
  - †Triceratops sulcatus – type locality for species
- †Trigonia
  - †Trigonia americana
  - †Trigonia elegantissima
  - †Trigonia montanaensis
  - †Trigonia quadrangularis
- †Trioracodon
  - †Trioracodon bisulcus – type locality for species
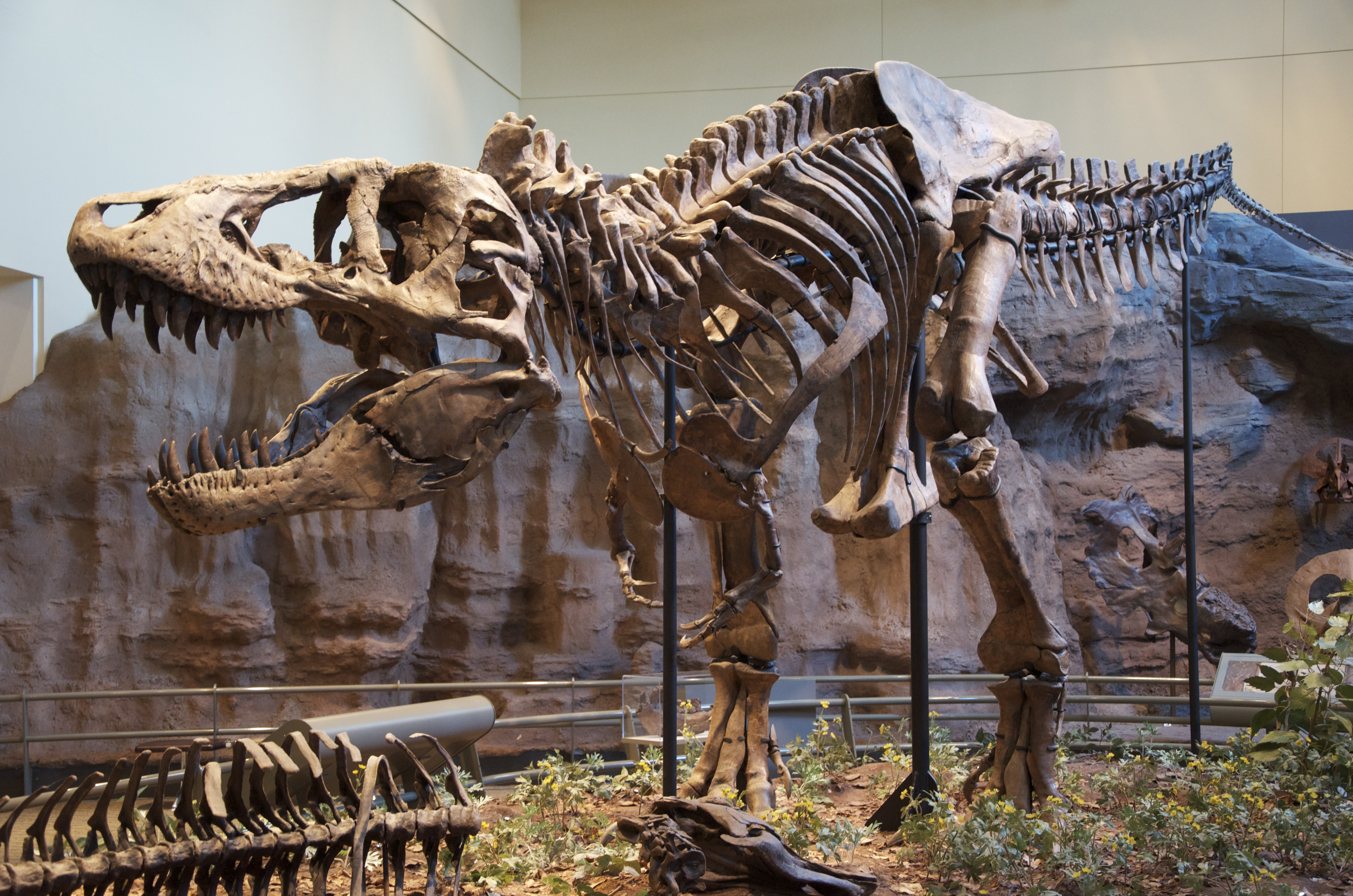
- Fossilized skeleton of the Late Cretaceous tyrannosaur Tyrannosaurus
  Trochocyathus – tentative report
- †Trochodendroides
- †Troodon
  - †Troodon formosus
- †Turgidodon
  - †Turgidodon rhaister – type locality for species
  - †Turgidodon russelli
- Typha
- †Tyrannosaurus – type locality for genus
  - †Tyrannosaurus rex – type locality for species

== U ==
- †Ulmiphyllum
  - †Ulmiphyllum densinerve – type locality for species
- †Uluops – type locality for genus
  - †Uluops uluops – type locality for species
- Unio
- †Unionites
  - †Unionites fassaensis

== V ==
- Vanikoro
  - †Vanikoro ambigua
- †Vanikoropsis
  - †Vanikoropsis nebrascensis
- †Vaugonia
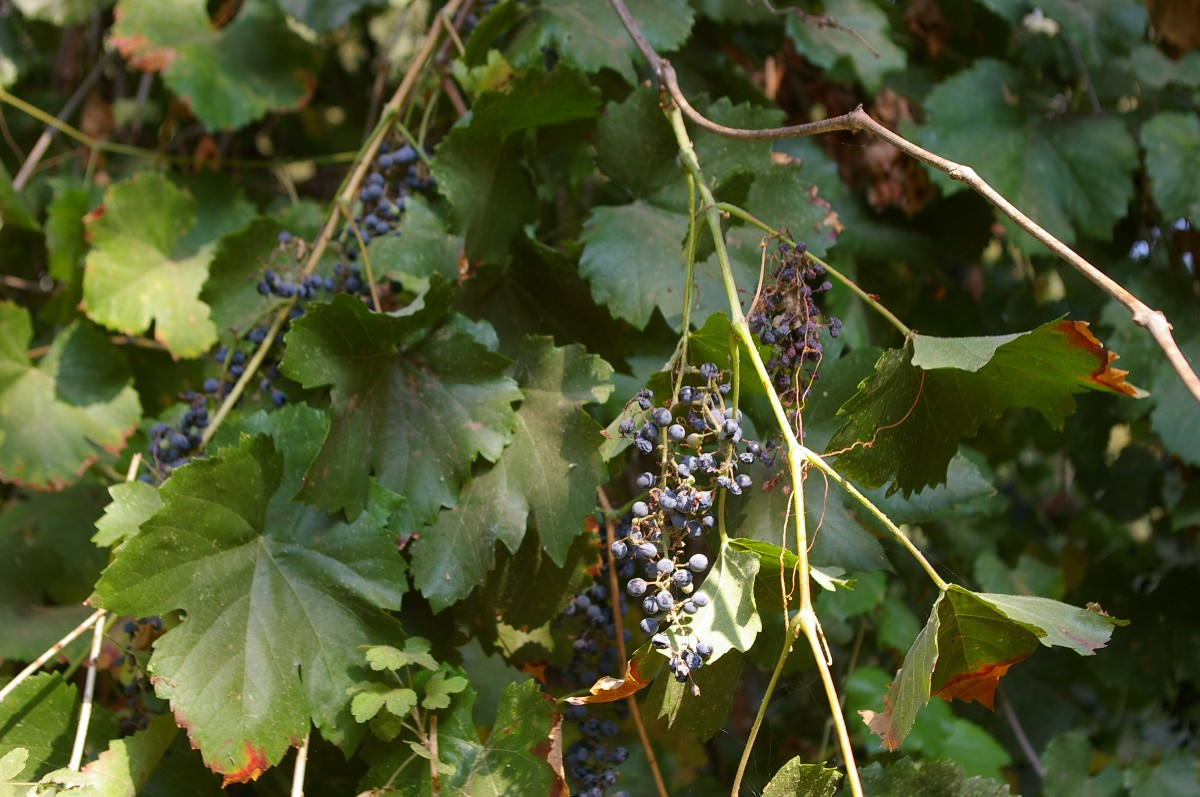
  - Leaves and fruit of a living Vitis, or grapevine
    †Vaugonia conradi
- †Veniella
  - †Veniella mortoni
- †Viburnum
  - †Viburnum marginatum
  - †Viburnum montanum
  - †Viburnum rotundifolium
- Vitis
  - †"Vitis" stantoni
- Viviparus – or unidentified comparable form
- †Volutoderma

== W ==
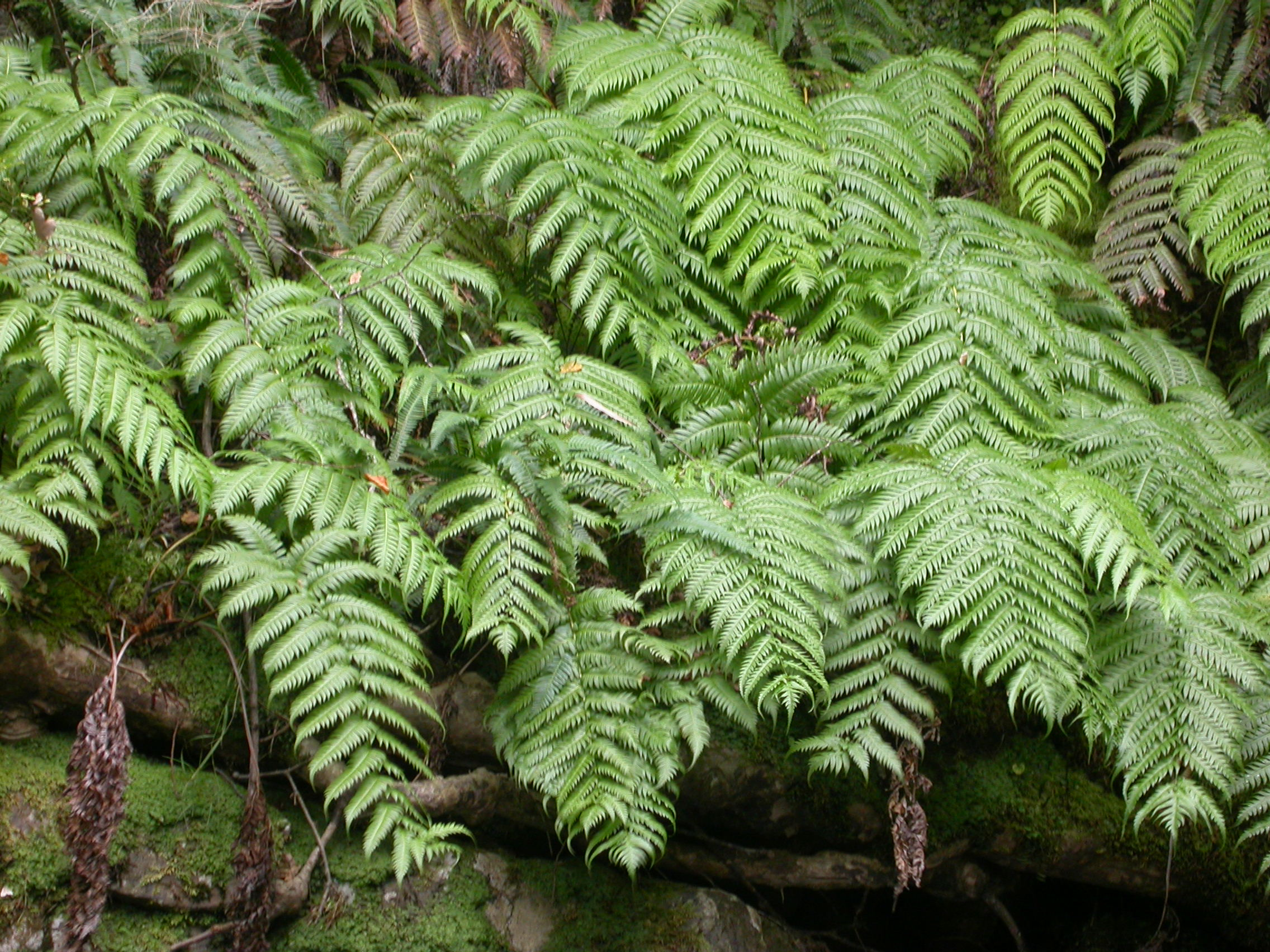
Living Woodwardia ferns

- †Weediaphyllum – type locality for genus
  - †Weediaphyllum parkensis – type locality for species
- †Weichselia
  - †Weichselia reticulata
- †Williamsonia – tentative report
  - †Williamsonia phoenicopsoides – type locality for species
- †Woodwardia
  - †Woodwardia crenata

== X ==
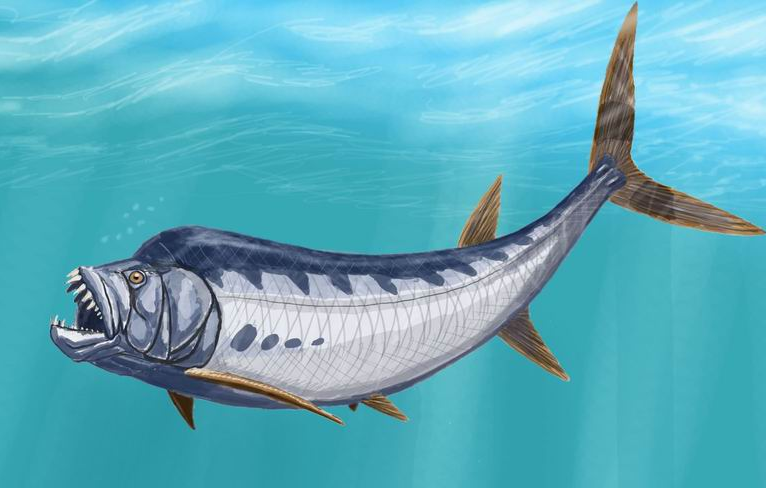
Life restoration of the Cretaceous bony fish Xiphactinus

- †Xenocephalites
- †Xenoxylon
- †Xiphactinus
  - †Xiphactinus vetus

== Y ==
- Yoldia
  - †Yoldia scitula – or unidentified related form
  - †Yoldia ventricosa

== Z ==
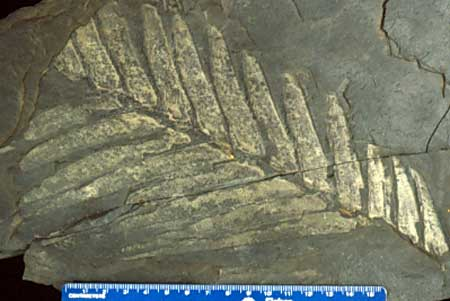
Fossil of the Early Triassic-Eocene cycad-like frond Zamites

- †Zamites
  - †Zamites arcticus
  - †Zamites borealis
  - †Zamites brevipennis
- †Zapsalis – or unidentified comparable form
- †Zephyrosaurus – or unidentified comparable form
- †Zofiabaatar – type locality for genus
  - †Zofiabaatar pulcher – type locality for species
