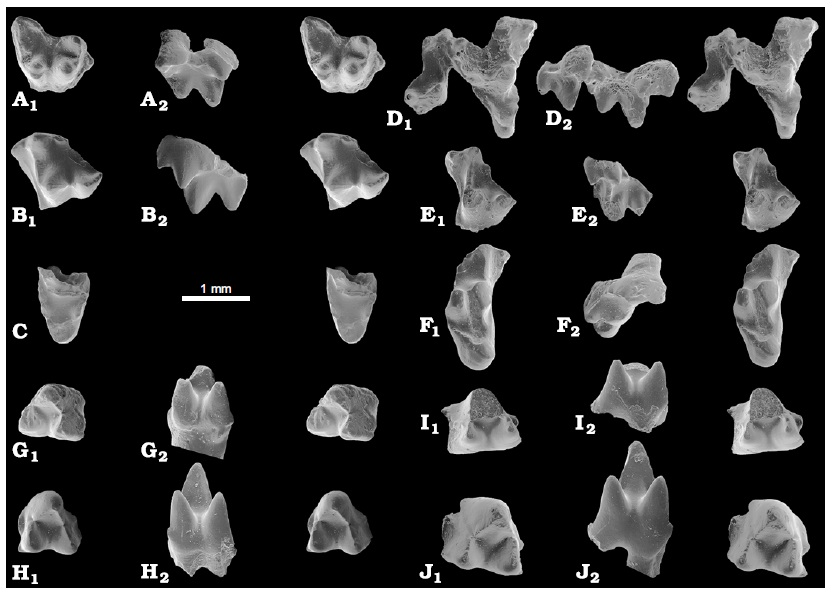

Scientific classification
- Kingdom: Animalia
- Phylum: Chordata
- Class: Mammalia
- Family: †Pappotheriidae; Slaughter, 1965
- Genus: †Pappotherium; Slaughter, 1965

Species
- P. pattersoni Slaughter, 1965

Synonyms
- Slaughteria Butler, 1978

= Pappotherium =

Pappotherium Temporal range: 112.6–109 Ma

Extinct family of mammals

Pappotherium is an extinct genus of mammals from the Albian (early Cretaceous) of Texas, US, known from a fossilized maxilla fragment bearing two tribosphenic molars, discovered within the Glen Rose Formation near Decatur, Wise County, Texas.

The fossil was discovered by Bob H. Slaughter within some deposits dating back to 112.6 – 109 million years ago. On the basis of the morphology of the molars' cusps, in 1965 Slaughter established the new genus Pappotherium and the new species P. pattersoni; he also created an apposite family, Pappotheriidae. Both this family and the genus are nowadays still monotypic.

Slaughter argued that Pappotherium should have been a basal form close to the metatherian-eutherian divergence point; this mammal likely was an arboreal insectivore.

Etymologically speaking, the name Pappotherium is a compound of the Latin words pappus (from ancient Greek πάππος, páppos, "grandfather") and therium (from ancient Greek θηρίον, thēríon, "beast", a common suffix among extinct mammals), with the full meaning of "mammal-grandfather".

The second part of the unique species' name, pattersoni, was instead chosen in honor of the American paleontologist Bryan Patterson.

More recently, it has been recovered as a possible deltatheroidean. The most recent phylogeny including Pappotherium is reproduced below.

- Metatheria
  - Holoclemensia
  - - - Pappotherium
      - - Sulestes
        - Oklatheridium
        - - Tsagandelta
          - - Lotheridium
            - - Deltatheroides
              - Deltatheridium
              - - Nanocuris
                - Atokatheridium
    - Marsupialiformes

== Bibliography ==
- Slaughter, B. H. 1965, "A therian from the lower Cretaceous (Albian) of Texas", Postilla 93, Peabody Museum of Natural History, Yale University, pp. 1–18.
- Davis, B. M. & Cifelli, R. L. 2011, "Reappraisal of the tribosphenidan mammals from the Trinity Group (Aptian–Albian) of Texas and Oklahoma", Acta Palaeontologica Polonica 56 (3), pp. 441–62.
