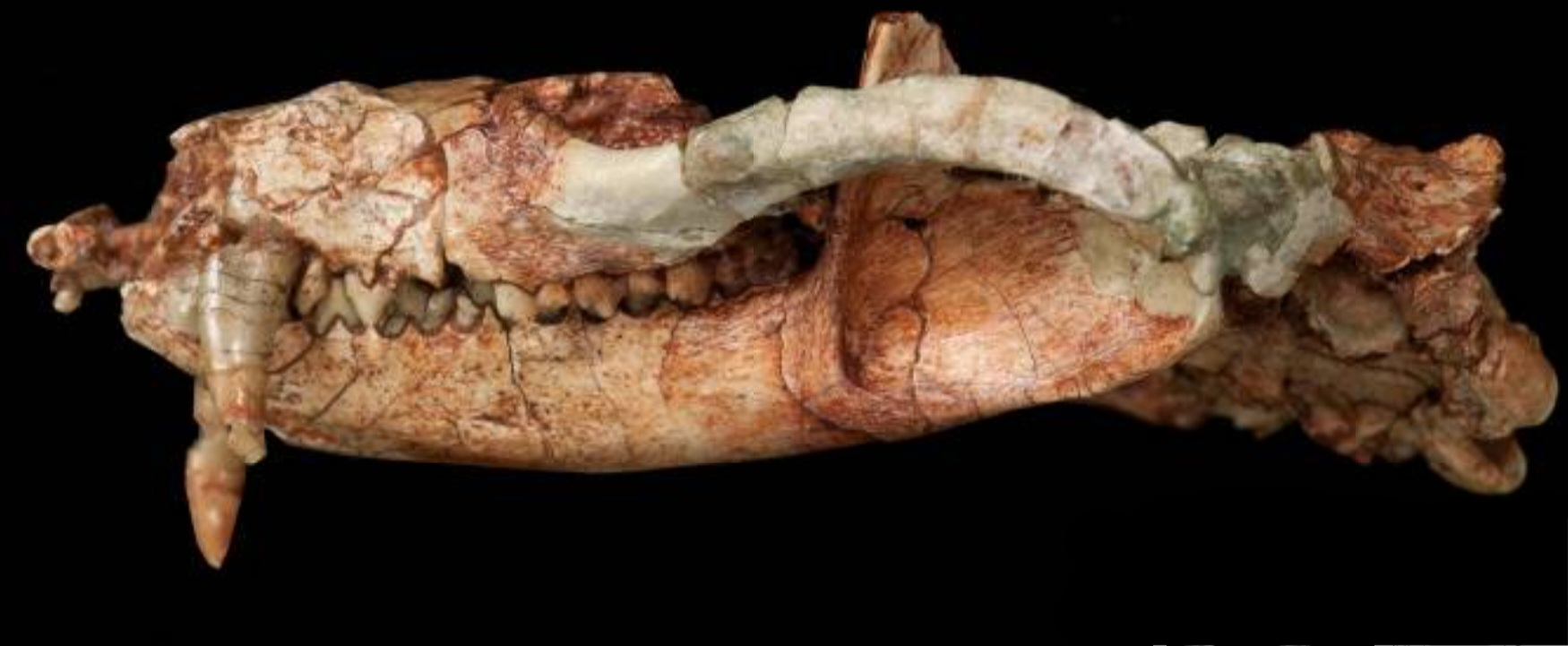
- Holotype skull (ZMNH M9032)

Scientific classification
- Kingdom: Animalia
- Phylum: Chordata
- Class: Mammalia
- Order: †Deltatheroida
- Family: †Deltatheridiidae
- Genus: †Lotheridium; Bi et al. 2015
- Species: †L. mengi

Binomial name
- †Lotheridium mengi Bi et al. 2015

= Lotheridium =

Lotheridium Temporal range: Late Cretaceous (Maastrichtian), ~72–66 Ma

Extinct genus of mammals

Lotheridium is an extinct genus of deltatheroidan mammals that lived in what is now Asia during the Late Cretaceous, about 72–66 million years ago. The genus contains a single species, Lotheridium mengi, named in 2015 after paleontologist Jin Meng. It is known from a single fossil specimen—a skull with associated lower jaws—found in the Qiupa Formation of Henan Province, China and housed in the collections of the Zhejiang Museum of Natural History. The skull measures 67.3 mm (2.65 in) in length, suggesting Lotheridium was large compared to most other deltatheroidans. Though the preserved skull is almost complete, it has been flattened and the skull roof was crushed during fossilization.

Lotheridium is believed to be a carnivore. It had a short snout and 46 teeth, among which the upper canines are the largest and most elongated. Though its lower canines are far smaller than the upper pair, they are still large enough that there are small gaps in the upper jaw to hold them when the mouth is closed. Its molars are adapted for shearing flesh. They bear unique cusps which can be used to differentiate it from its relatives. As with all deltatheroidans, its closest living relatives are the marsupials.

As the first deltatheroidan found in central China, Lotheridium showed that the group was more widespread across Asia than previously known. Deltatheroidans are otherwise known from North American and elsewhere in Asia, and debate exists over which continent the group first evolved in before spreading the other. Dating to the Maastrichtian age, the Qiupa Formation represents a tropical to subtropical depositional environment with a shallow lake and braided river delta. Lotheridium lived alongside a many different species such as dinosaurs, lizards, turtles, and other mammals.

== Discovery and naming ==
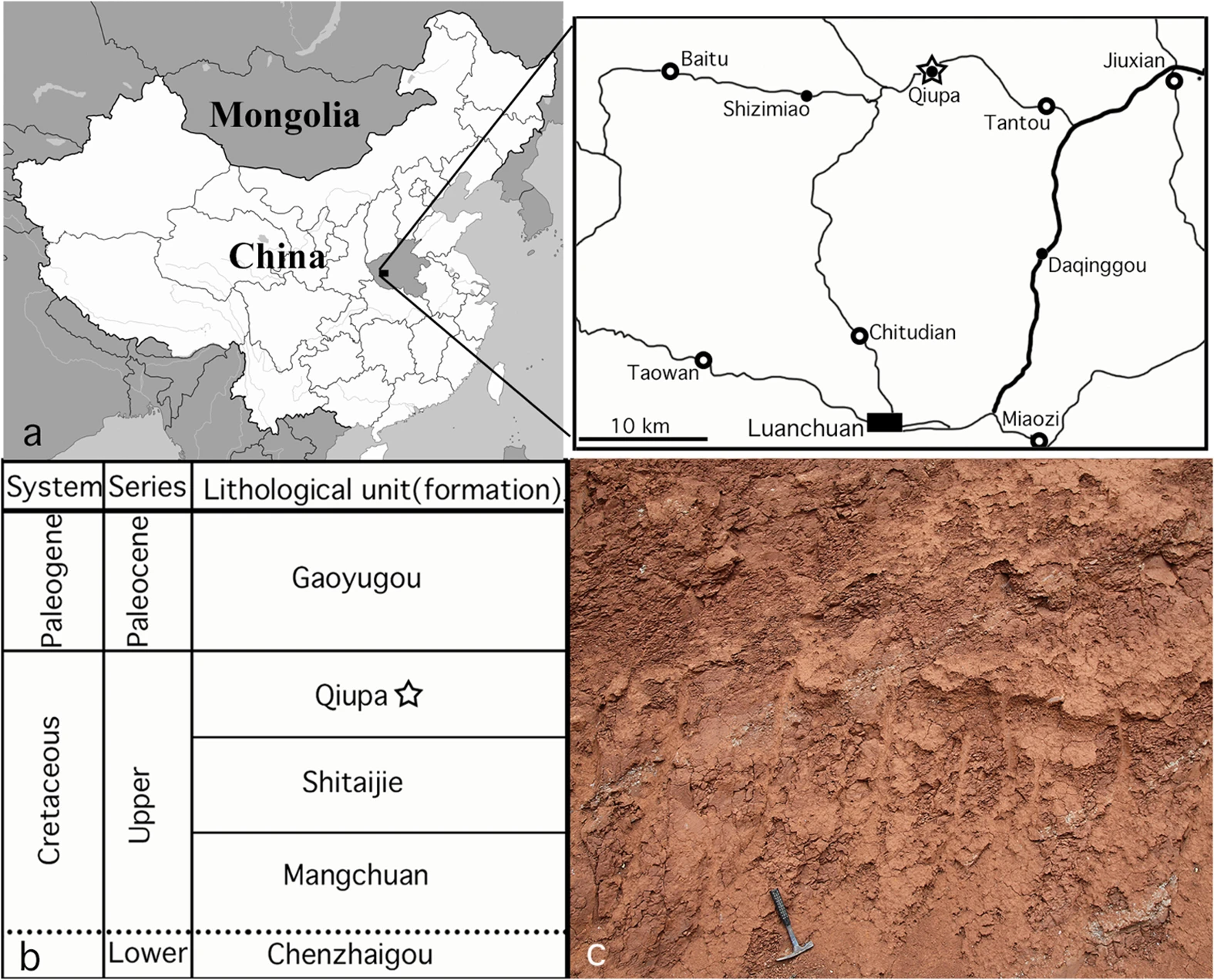
Map showing the location of the Qiupa Formation with a corresponding stratigraphic chart

In 2015, a team of four Chinese paleontologists reported the discovery of an almost complete fossilized skull in Henan Province, China. The skull was excavated from Late Cretaceous-aged rock deposits of the Qiupa Formation in Haoping Village, Luanchuan County, and was deposited at the Zhejiang Museum of Natural History under the specimen number ZMNH M9032. After studying this fossil, the team concluded that it represented a previously unknown genus and species of prehistoric mammal which they named Lotheridium mengi. They designated the skull as the holotype (name-bearing) specimen. The generic name combines the name of Luoyang (the prefecture Luanchuan County is part of) with the Ancient Greek word theridion (meaning "small beast"). The specific name honors Jin Meng (a paleontologist who studies Mesozoic mammals).

== Description ==
Lotheridium is currently known from only one specimen: the holotype skull with associated lower jaws. The specimen is nearly complete, but has been flattened during the process of fossilization such that the skull roof has been crushed. This skull has a total length of 67.3 mm (2.65 in), suggesting that Lotheridium was much larger than most other deltatheroidans with the exception of Deltatheroides. As all the teeth are erupted and worn, this skull likely belongs to a full-grown adult.

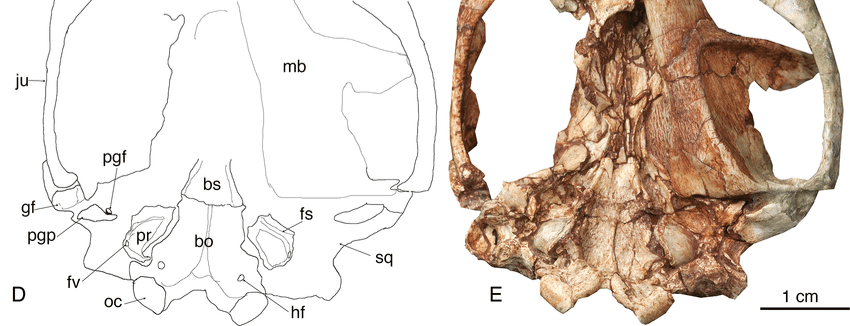
Underside of the back of the skull (E) with an explanatory line drawing (D) labeling the main structures

The snout of Lotheridium is short and makes up under a third of the skull's length. The short premaxilla bone forms the tip of the upper jaw and bears all the upper incisor teeth, in addition to forming the front margin of the socket for the upper canine tooth. This bone has a large indentation between where the canine and hindmost incisor are positioned, which the tip of the lower canine fits into when the mouth is shut. Most of the incisive foramen (an opening on the hard palate) is also present on the premaxilla. The hind margin of this foramen is on the maxilla bone, as is most of the upper canine socket. This bone has a large opening called the infraorbital foramen, in front of which the maxilla depresses inward, possibly to serve as an attachment point for facial muscles. Behind the maxilla is the lacrimal bone, located behind the eye socket and expanding greatly onto the face. The middle of the skull roof is made up of the frontal bones, and the hind part of the roof is formed by the larger parietal bones. Each frontal bears a bony projection called a postorbital process and a ridge behind it called the temporal line. These ridges converge towards the back of the bone and join each other at the border of the frontal and parietal bones, forming a sagittal crest. The cheek bones are strongly arched, forming a structure known as the zygomatic arch on each side of the skull. The arch is mostly made up of a bone called the jugal (though the lacrimal and squamosal bones also contribute to it), which has a projection halfway down its length marking the back of the eye socket. At the hind part of each zygomatic arch is a depression called the mandibular fossa (where the lower jaw articulates), and behind this depression is a bony projection called the postglenoid process.

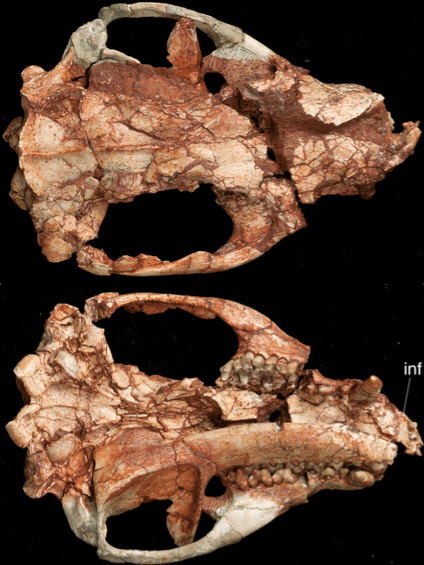
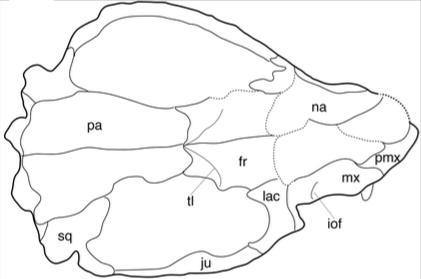
Skull (left) as seen from above (top) and below (bottom), and a labeled line drawing of the same skull seen from above (right)

Forming the middle of the underside of the skull is a wide, flat bone called the basisphenoid, with raised ridges on either side of it. Behind it is the basioccipital bone, which makes up the base of the skull and has a V-shaped indentation at its hind part. On either side of the notch is a large, rounded protrusion called an occipital condyle. Part of the middle ear is housed by a hollow, bulging protrusion of the petrosal bone called a promontorium, which bears a groove for a facial nerve and an oval window that opens to the side. Like that of the related Deltatheridium, the promontorium of Lotheridium has no grooves for blood vessels. The supraoccipital bone at the back of the skull has a prominent, backward-pointing structure called a lambdoidal crest.

The robust mandible (lower jaw) is deepest at the point where the third molar is attached, and its underside is slightly curved. Two small openings called mental foramina can be seen from the side of the jaw, located below the first molar and second premolar teeth respectively. The coronoid process of the mandible (a projection behind the teeth) is prominent, its front margin forming a 135° angle with the corresponding tooth row. A depression where the masseter muscle would attach (known as the masseteric fossa) is visible below it. The point where the jaw articulates with the rest of the skull, called the mandibular condyle, is low and almost level with the teeth. On the lingual side of the mandible (the surfaces facing the tongue), the mandibular symphysis (where the two halves of the lower jaw join together) is unfused and an inward-facing bony projection is present at each angle.

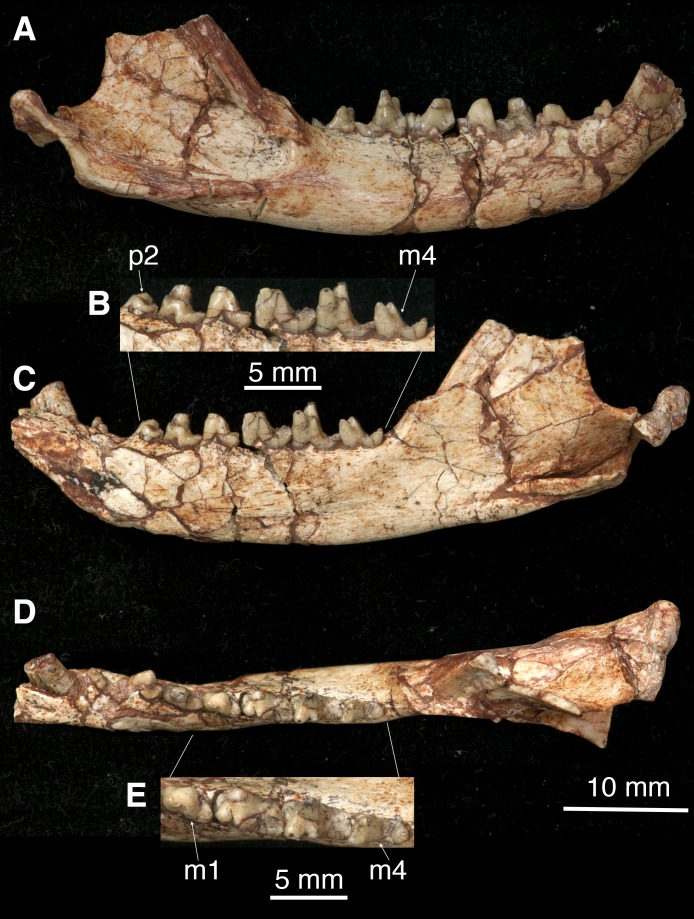
Right lower jaw as seen from multiple perspectives, with closeups of the teeth (B and E)

Like other derived metatherian mammals, Lotheridium has a dental formula of 4.1.3.43.1.3.4 for a total of 46 teeth. That is, each half of the upper jaw bears four incisors, one canine, three premolars and four molars, whereas each half of the lower jaw has three incisors, one canine, three premolars and four molars. The upper canines are very elongated, measuring 11.9 mm (0.47 in) and pointing downwards almost perpendicular to the jaw. Though not nearly as large as the upper canines, the lower canines are still tall compared to the rest of the teeth, and a small gap is present between the incisors and canines in each half of the upper jaw to accommodate the corresponding lower canine. Each of the upper premolars is separated from the one next to it by a small gap, as are the first and second lower premolars.

The first upper premolar of Lotheridium differs from those of some other extinct metatherians (namely the stagodontids Didelphodon, Eobrasilia and Eodelphis) in lacking a developed pair of accessory cusps. Furthermore, this tooth is proportionately larger in Lotheridium than it is in the aforementioned stagodontids, Malleodectes, Gaylordia, or Didelphopsis. Because the amount of wear on each molar decreases towards the back of the mouth in both the upper and lower jaws, it has been determined that the molars erupt in order from front to back. Unlike in all other deltatheroidans, the protocones (one of the cusps) on the upper molars of Lotheridium stretch further sideways and the lower molars bear small cusps with a shelf-like structure (named "cuspule f"), so these features are used as the diagnostic traits to distinguish Lotheridium from its relatives.

== Classification ==
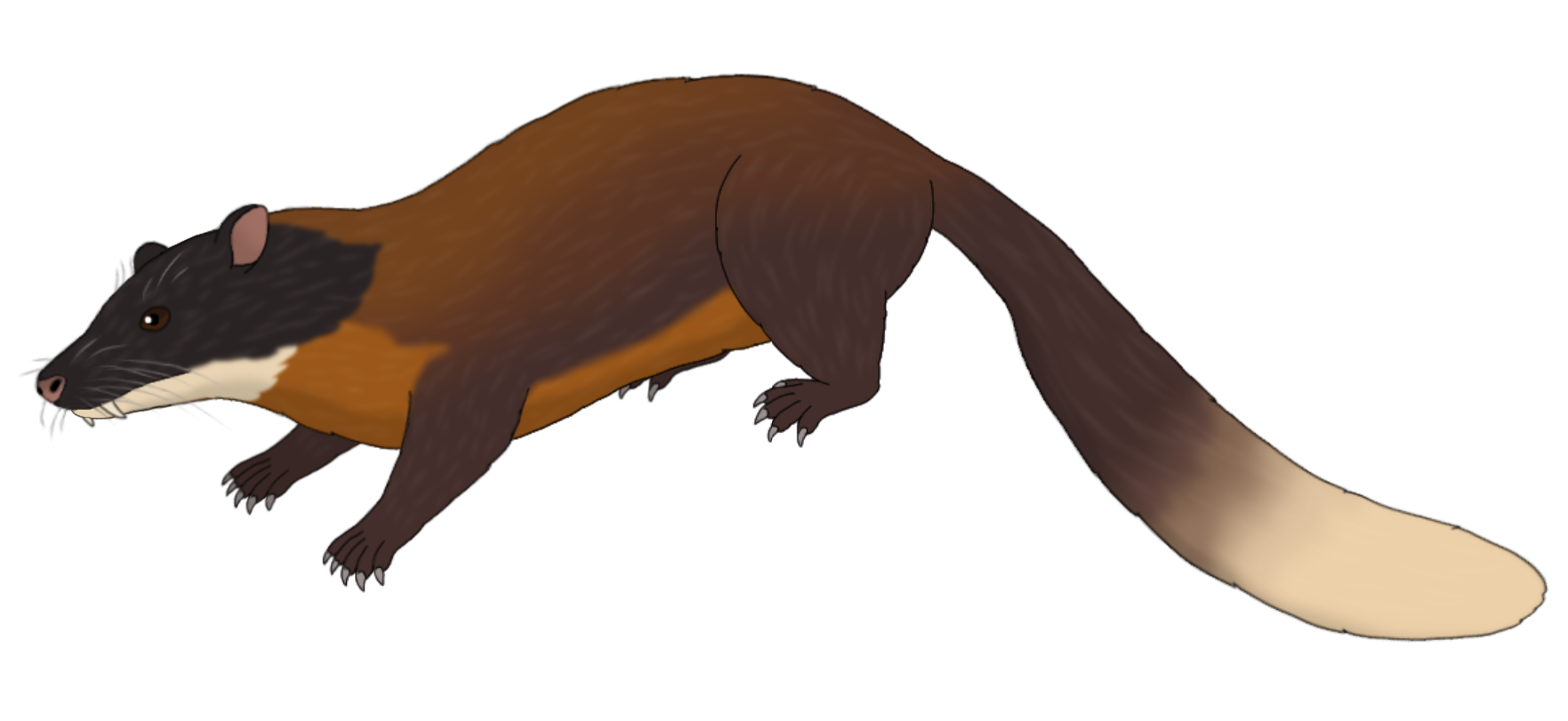
Speculative life restoration of Lotheridium

Lotheridium belongs to the family Deltatheridiidae within an extinct order of mammals known as the Deltatheroida. The deltatheroidans are part of the larger clade Metatheria, whose only extant members are the marsupials, meaning that marsupials are the closest living relatives of Lotheridium. In the 2015 study first describing this genus, a phylogenetic analysis was carried out, recovering Lotheridium in a sister group position to a clade including Atokatheridium, Nanocuris, Deltatheridium and Deltatheroides. The following year, a different study also reached a similar conclusion, adding a fifth genus, Gurbanodelta, to this sister group. The following cladogram shows the position of Lotheridium within Deltatheroida according to the latter study:

- Deltatheroida
  - Pappotherium
  - - Oklatheridium
    - Sulestes
    - - Tsagandelta
      - - Lotheridium
        - - - Deltatheridium
            - Deltatheroides
          - - Atokatheridium
            - - Nanocuris
              - Gurbanodelta

The pattern of deltatheroidan dispersal has been debated among experts. Historically, the group was believed to have first evolved in Asia and later spread into North America. This was because the former continent has yielded most of their known specimens, including some of the oldest known at the time (Coniacian-aged fossils of Sulestes from Uzbekistan). However, North American fossils of Atokatheridium and Oklatheridium which predate any known Asian deltatheroidans were later reported in the 2000s, leading some authors to believe that the group originated here. Even so, others continued to believe in an Asian origin for deltatheroidans, citing how Asian genera tend to be recovered in more basal (earlier-diverging) positions in phylogenetic analyses. Being one of the geologically youngest deltatheroidans, Lotheridium does not provide new information on the origins of the group, but its discovery in central China (where deltatheroidans had not been found previously) does show that the group was more widespread in Asia than formerly known.

== Paleobiology ==
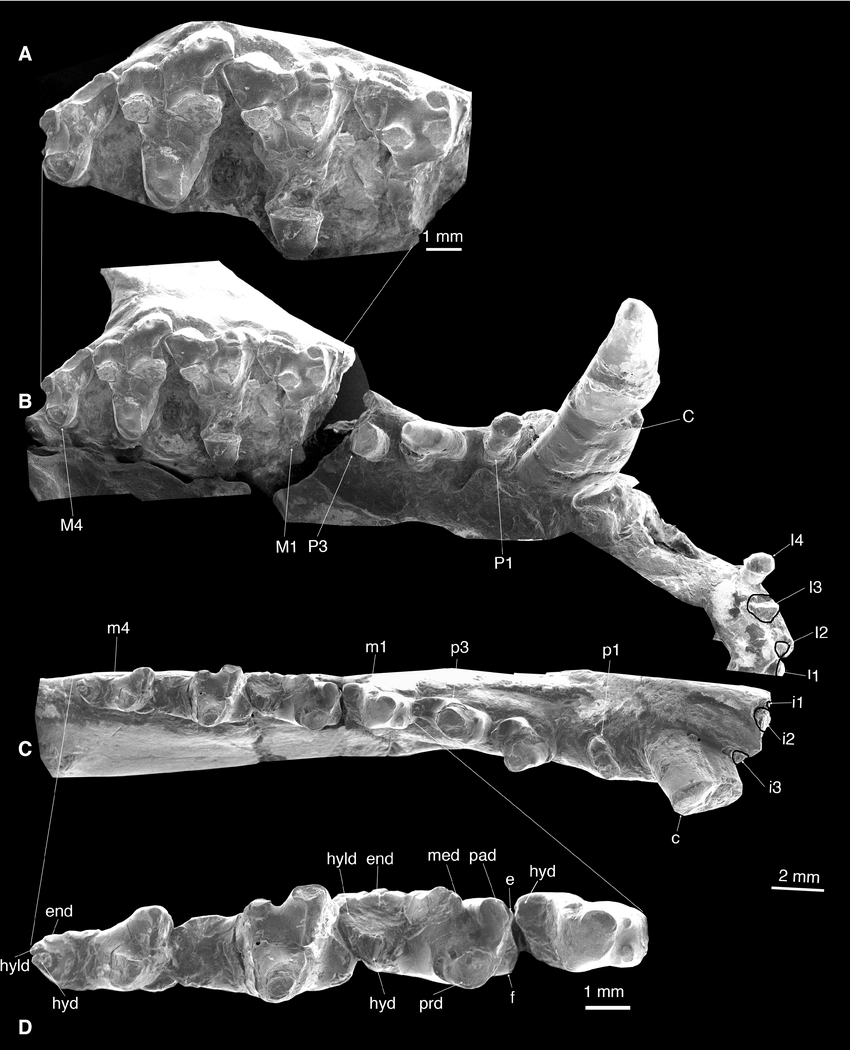
Dentition of the upper (B) and lower (C) jaws, with closeups of the upper (A) and lower (D) molars

Deltatheroidans such as Lotheridium are believed to have been carnivorous animals. This is supported by the fact that two of the ridges—the postmetacrista and preprotocrista—of their upper molars form a prominent mechanism for shearing flesh. Similar shearing mechanisms formed by the postmetacrista have convergently evolved in other carnivorous mammals such as carnivorans, dasyurids, borhyaenids and stagodontids, though the preprotocrista is not involved in the shearing mechanism of marsupials and eutherian mammals. In addition, a study on jaw shapes to predict the feeding ecology of Mesozoic mammals further supports that the related Deltatheridium was a carnivore. Potential prey of deltatheroidans may have included animals up to the size of small dinosaurs, as the skull of a juvenile Archaeornithoides (a theropod dinosaur) has been found with bite marks matching a mammal of this group.

Based on the amount of wear, the third premolar of both the upper and lower jaws in the only known Lotheridium specimen likely erupted far later than the first and second premolars. In extant marsupials (the closest living relatives of deltatheroidans), only the third deciduous premolar is replaced by a permanent tooth, whereas the first two are kept throughout the animal's life without replacement. The wear patterns indicate that Lotheridium had the same tooth replacement pattern as marsupials, and that this pattern had already evolved in the common ancestor of marsupials and deltatheroidans. This further suggests that the two groups may have similar feeding systems and reproductive patterns.

== Paleoenvironment ==
The only known specimen of Lotheridium was collected from an exposure of the Qiupa Formation. Although this formation was originally thought to have formed during the Paleocene epoch, the discovery of tyrannosaurid dinosaur teeth from its deposits in 1974 has proven that it dates further back to the Late Cretaceous. The Qiupa Formation has been divided into three sections, and the exposure at Haoping is considered part of Section B. The fossil-bearing beds of the formation are located 30–50 m (98–164 ft) below the K-T boundary (which marks the end of the Mesozoic era), and are therefore believed to have formed during the Maastrichtian age of the Cretaceous period (between 72 and 66 million years ago). At this time, the area had a shallow lake and a braided river delta. This can be determined from how the fossil-bearing beds are made up of mudstones and siltstones with interbedded fine conglomerates, which form in such environments. Geochemical and pollen analyses indicates that the area was humid to semihumid and possessed a tropical to subtropical climate during the Late Cretaceous.

The deposits of the Qiupa Formation have yielded fossilized remains of a wide variety of animals which likely lived alongside Lotheridium. Remains of one other mammal species, the large multituberculate Yubaatar zhongyuanensis, have been discovered at this site. Dinosaurs are the most diverse animal group represented in the fossil assemblage of the formation, with the first to be discovered being teeth of a tyrannosaurid originally named as Tyrannosaurus luanchuanensis (sometimes considered a junior synonym of Tarbosaurus bataar). Smaller theropod dinosaurs have also been named from the Qiupa Formation, including the dromaeosaurid Luanchuanraptor, the oviraptorid Yulong, the ornithomimid Qiupalong, the alvarezsaurid Qiupanykus, and the enantiornithine bird Yuornis. Partial remains of sauropods, ankylosaurs and possibly protoceratopsids are also known, but have not been attributed to any named genera or species. Aside from dinosaurs, reptiles known from the Qiupa Formation fossil assemblage include the lizards Funiusaurus, Tianyusaurus, and Zhongyuanxi, as well as unnamed turtles.
