= Arcantiodelphys =

Arcantiodelphys Temporal range: Upper Cretaceous

Scientific classification
- Kingdom: Animalia
- Phylum: Chordata
- Class: Mammalia
- (unranked): Marsupialiformes
- Genus: Arcantiodelphys Vullo et al., 2009

Species
- A. marchandi Vullo et al., 2009 (type)

Extinct genus of mammals

Arcantiodelphys is an extinct genus of basal Metatheria which existed in France during the Cenomanian age. It was first named by Romain Vullo, Emmanuel Gheerbrant, Christian de Muizon and Didier Néraudeau in 2009 and the type species is Arcantiodelphys marchandi.

== Phylogeny ==
Cladogram after Vullo et al. (2009).

- - Peramus
  - Boreosphenida
    - Kielantherium
    - - Holoclemensia
      - Eutheria
        - Maelestes
        - Prokennalestes
      - Metatheria
        - Sinodelphys
        - - Deltatheridium
          - Marsupialiformes
            - Arcantiodelphys
            - Dakotadens
            - - Kokopellia
              - - Asiatherium
                - - Marsupialia
                  - - Adelodelphys
                    - Iugomortiferum
                    - Pariadens
                    - Sinbadelphys
