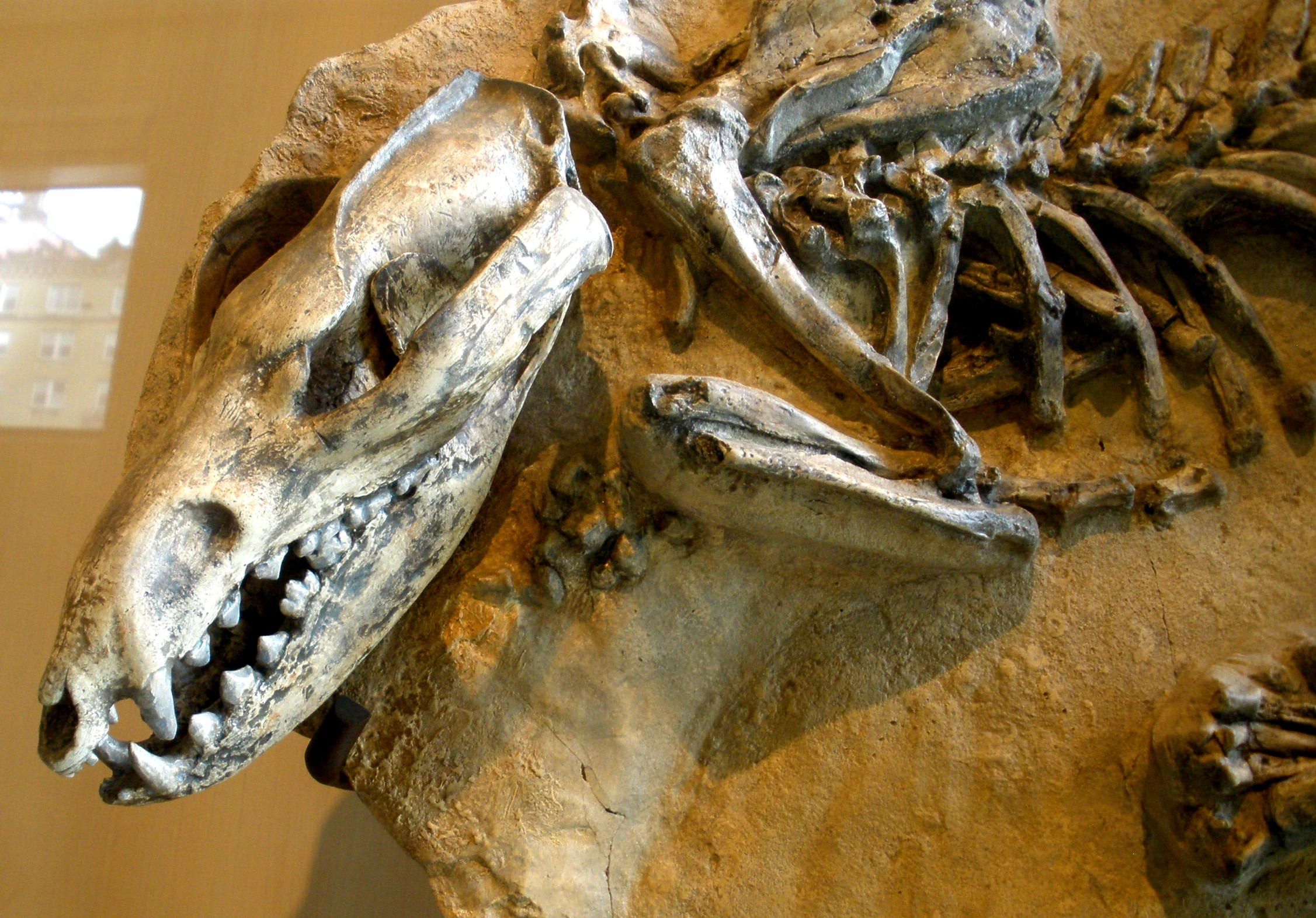
- Lycopsis longirostris, an extinct sparassodont, a relative of the marsupials
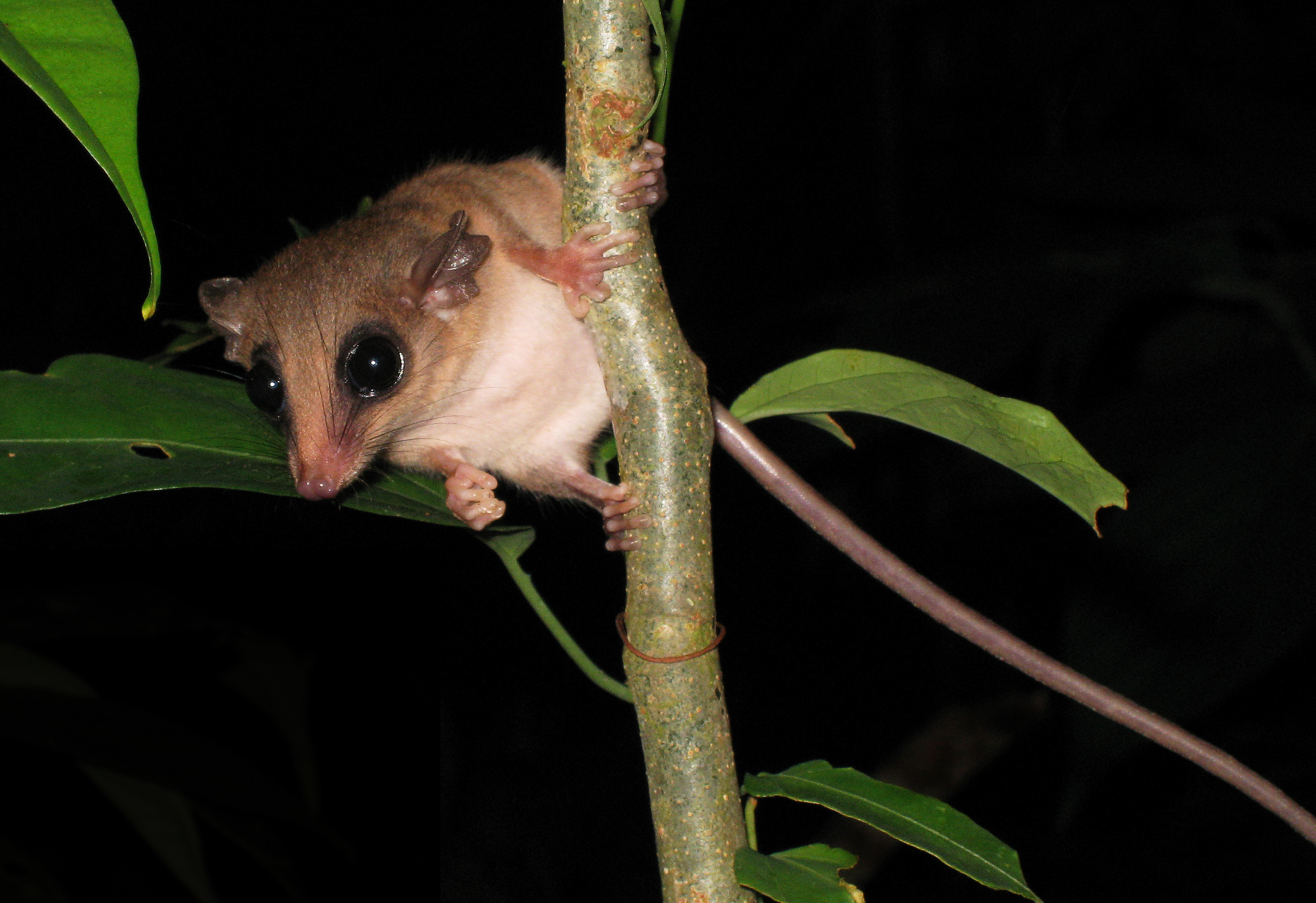
- A mouse opossum (Marmosa)

Scientific classification
- Kingdom: Animalia
- Phylum: Chordata
- Class: Mammalia
- Subclass: Theria
- Clade: Metatheria; Huxley, 1880

Subgroups
- †?Sinodelphys; †Holoclemensia; †Adinodon; †Deltatheroida; Marsupialiformes; †Adelodelphys; †Alphadontidae; †Asiadelphia; †Sinbadelphys; †Camptomus?; †Archimetatheria; †Stagodontidae; †Iqualadelphis; †Sparassodonta; †Pucadelphyidae; †Herpetotheriidae; †Anatoliadelphyidae; †Polydolopimorphia; †Peradectidae; †Pediomyidae; Marsupialia

= Metatheria =

Metatheria Temporal range: Early Cretaceous–recent

Clade of marsupials and close relatives

Metatheria is a mammalian clade that includes all mammals more closely related to marsupials than to placentals. First proposed by Thomas Henry Huxley in 1880, it is a more inclusive group than the marsupials; it contains all marsupials as well as many extinct non-marsupial relatives. It is one of two groups placed in the clade Theria alongside Eutheria, which contains the placentals. Remains of metatherians have been found on all of Earth's continents.

== Description ==
Distinctive characteristics (synapomorphies) of Metatheria include a prehensile tail, the development of a capitular tail on the humerus, the loss of tooth replacement on the second and fifth premolars, lower canines that outwardly diverge from each other, an angular process on the dentary bone—which additionally bears a posterior shelf in its masseteric fossa in Metatheria—that is equal to or greater than the length of the ramus, and the lower fifth premolar (alternatively identified as a first molar) with a "very trenchant" cristid obliqua/ectolophid. It has been disputed as to the identity of the supposed, retained deciduous molar-like fifth premolars. Under one hypothesis, the third premolar found in basal therians was lost, leaving four premolars in the halves of each jaw. A 2025 study alternately suggested that the ancestral therian had a cheek tooth dentition comprising 5 premolars and 4 molars in each half of the lower jaw, and that in metatherians the front two premolar teeth were lost (in contrast eutherians are suggested to have lost the posterior-most molar, and later the middle premolar in placentals), leaving an inventory of 3 premolars and 4 molars, and that that thus sometimes assumed "fifth premolar" of metatherians is in fact a true first molar.

== Evolutionary history ==
Most morphological evidence comparing traits, such as the number and arrangement of teeth and the structure of the reproductive and waste elimination systems, favors a closer evolutionary relationship between marsupials and placental mammals than either has with the monotremes, as does most genetic and molecular evidence. Metatherians diverged from the ancestors of eutherians by at least 125 million years ago during the Early Cretaceous, and possibly as early as 160 million years ago during the Jurassic period if the reportedly Late Jurassic Juramaia is a eutherian and correctly dated. The divergence between eutherians and metatherians is suggested to have taken place in Asia.

One of the earliest possible known metatherians is Sinodelphys szalayi, which lived in China during the Early Cretaceous around 125-120 million years ago (mya). This makes it a contemporary to some early eutherian species that have been found in the same area. However, Bi et al. (2018) reinterpreted Sinodelphys as an early member of Eutheria. The oldest uncontested widely accepted metatherians are now 110 million year old fossils from western North America. In 2026, Archetheridium was described from the same Early Cretaceous Chinese deposits that contain Sinodelphys. The descibers argued that Archetheridium was a true metatherian belonging to the early branching Deltatheroida, and thus the currently oldest known unambiguous metatherian. Metatherians were widespread in Asia and North America during the Late Cretaceous, including both Deltatheroida and Marsupialiformes, with fossils also known from Europe during this time. During the Late Cretaceous, metatherians were more diverse than eutherians in North America. Metatherians underwent a severe decline during the Cretaceous–Paleogene extinction event, more severe than that suffered by contemporary eutherians and multituberculates, and were slower to recover diversity.

Morphological and species diversity of metatherians in Laurasia remained low in comparison to eutherians throughout the Cenozoic. The two major groups of Cenozoic Laurasian metatherians, the opossum-like herpetotheriids and peradectids persisted into the Oligocene and Miocene before becoming extinct, with the North American herpetotheriid Herpetotherium, the European herpetotheriid Amphiperatherium, and the north American peradectid Nanodelphys being the youngest Laurasian non-marsupial metatherians (with marsupials invading North America during the Pliocene-Pleistocene as part of the Great American interchange). The placement of putative Asian Miocene peradectids Siamoperadectes and Sinoperadectes as metatherians been questioned and they may be eutherians instead. Metatherians first arrived in Afro-Arabia during the Paleogene, probably from Europe, including the possible peradectoid Kasserinotherium from the Early Eocene of Tunisia and the herpetotheriid Peratherium africanum from the Early Oligocene of Egypt and Oman. The youngest African metatherian is the possible herpetotheriid Morotodon from the late Early Miocene of Uganda.

Metatherians arrived in South America from North America during the latest Cretaceous or Paleocene and underwent a major diversificiation, with South American metatherians including both the ancestors of extant marsupials as well as the extinct Sparassodonta, which were major predators in South American ecosystems during most of the Cenozoic, up until their extinction in the Pliocene-earliest Pleistocene, as well as the Polydolopimorphia, which likely had a wide range of diets. Metatherians then declined in diversity in South America during the Late Eocene as well as the later Oligocene epoch. The oldest known Australian marsupials are from the early Eocene, and are thought to have arrived in the region after having dispersed via Antarctica from South America. During the Oligocene epoch, Australian metatherians radiated rapidly, which contributed most to the global peak in metatherian diversity during the Early Miocene. The only known Antarctic metatherians are from the Early Eocene La Meseta Formation of the Antarctic Peninsula, where they are the most diverse group of mammals, and include marsupials as well as polydolopimorphians.

== Classification ==
Below is a metatherian cladogram from Wilson et al. (2016):

- Metatheria
  - †Holoclemensia
  - - †Deltatheroida
      - †Pappotheriidae
        †Pappotherium
      - †Deltatheridiidae
        - †Sulestes
        - †Oklatheridium
        - - †Tsagandelta
          - - †Lotheridium
            - - †Deltatheroides
              - †Deltatheridium
              - - †Nanocuris
                - †Atokatheridium
    - Marsupialiformes
      - - †Gurlin Tsav skull
        - - †Borhyaenidae
          - - †Mayulestes
            - - †Jaskhadelphys
              - - †Andinodelphys
                - †Pucadelphys
      - - †Asiatherium
        - - - †Iugomortiferum
            - †Kokopellia
          - †Aenigmadelphys
          - †Anchistodelphys
          - - †Glasbiidae
              †Glasbius
            - †Pediomyidae
              †Pediomys
          - †Stagodontidae
            - †Pariadens
            - - †Eodelphis
              - †Didelphodon
          - †Turgidodon
          - †Alphadon
          - †Albertatherium
          - Marsupialia

Cladogram according to Ladevèze et al. 2020:

- Metatheria
  - †Deltatheriidae
  - - †Kokopellia
    - - †Asiatherium
      - - †Peradectidae
        - - †Stagodontidae
          - - - †Pucadelphyidae
              - †Sparassodonta
            - - - †Amphiperatherium
                - †Peratherium
              - - †Herpetotherium
                - Marsupialia

Cladogram after Gernelle et al. 2026:

- Metatheria
  - †Deltatheridiidae
  - Marsupaliformes
    - †Kokopellia
    - - †Aenigmadelphys
      - - †Alphadontidae
        - - - †Stagodontidae (Didelphodon)
            - - †Pediomyididae (Pediomys)
              - †Glasbiidae (Glasbius)
          - Notometatheria
            - - †Polydolopimorphia
              - - †Sparassodonta
                - †Pucadelphyoidea (Pucadelphys+Incadelphys)
            - - †Thylacodon
              - - - †Swaindelphys
                  - - †Peratherium
                    - - †Anatoliadelphyidae
                      - - †"Herpetotherium" edwardi
                        - †Herpetotherium fugax
                        - - †Derorhynchus
                          - Marsupialia
                - †Peradectidae

Below is a listing of metatherians that do not fall readily into well-defined groups.

Basal Metatheria

- †Archaeonothos henkgodthelpi Beck 2015
- †Esteslestes ensis Novacek et al. 1991
- †Ghamidtherium dimaiensis Sánches-Villagra et al. 2007
- †Kasserinotherium tunisiense Crochet 1989
- †Palangania brandmayri Goin et al. 1998
- †Perrodelphys coquinense Goin et al. 1999

Ameridelphia incertae sedis:

- †Apistodon exiguus (Fox 1971) Davis 2007
- †Cocatherium lefipanum Goin et al. 2006
- †Dakotadens morrowi Eaton 1993
- †Iugomortiferum thoringtoni Cifelli 1990b
- †Marambiotherium glacialis Goin et al. 1999
- †Marmosopsis juradoi Paula Couto 1962 [Marmosopsini Kirsch & Palma 1995]
- †Pascualdelphys fierroensis
- †Progarzonia notostylopense Ameghino 1904
- †Protalphadon Cifelli 1990
  - †P. lulli (Clemens 1966) Cifelli 1990a
  - †P. foxi Johnson 1996

Marsupialia incertae sedis:

- †Itaboraidelphys camposi Marshall & de Muizon 1984
- †Mizquedelphys pilpinensis Marshall & de Muizon 1988
- †Numbigilga ernielundeliusi Beck et al. 2008 {Numbigilgidae Beck et al. 2008}
