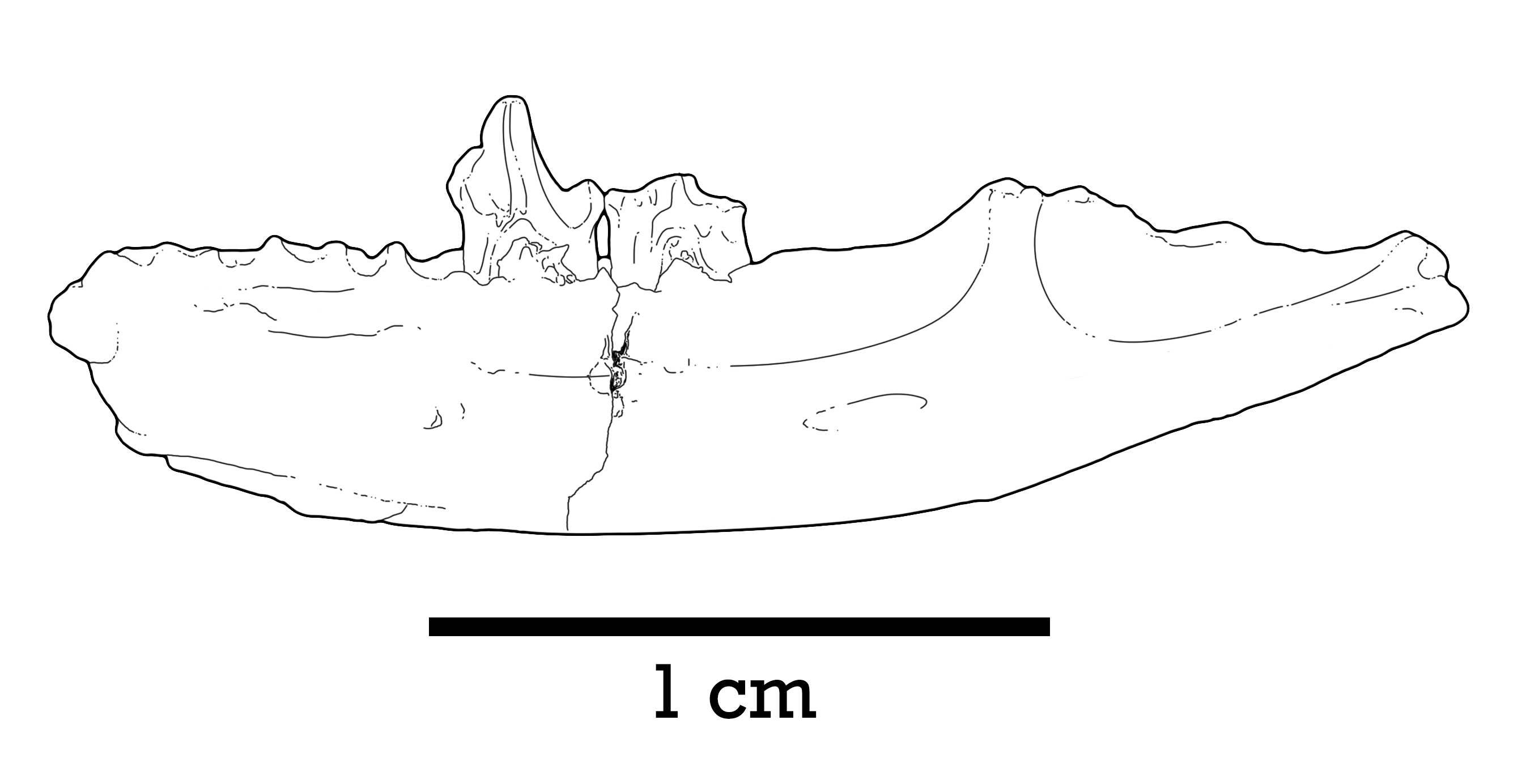
- Preserved left dentary in lateral view, holotype PSS-MAE 629

Scientific classification
- Kingdom: Animalia
- Phylum: Chordata
- Class: Mammalia
- Order: †Deltatheroida
- Family: †Deltatheridiidae
- Genus: †Tsagandelta; Rougier et al. 2015
- Species: †T. dashzevegi

Binomial name
- †Tsagandelta dashzevegi Rougier et al. 2015

= Tsagandelta =

Tsagandelta Temporal range: Late Cretaceous, 102–86 Ma

Extinct family of mammals

Tsagandelta (meaning "white crest") is a genus of deltatheroidean therian mammal that lived in Asia during the Late Cretaceous. Distantly related to modern marsupials, it is part of Deltatheroida, a lineage of carnivorous metatherians common in the Cretaceous of Asia and among the most successful non-theropod carnivores of the region. It represents the first known mammal from the Bayan Shireh Formation.

== Discovery and naming ==
The holotype was first discovered and collected in 2002 during the field expedition conducted by the Mongolian Academy of Sciences and the American Museum of Natural History, the specimen only preserved a partial left dentary. It was discovered on the outcrops at the Tsagan Tsonj locality in the Bayan Shireh Formation, the age is estimated to be around 102 million to 86 million years ago, between the Cenomanian and Santonian stages of the Late Cretaceous epoch. The generic name, Tsagandelta, is derived from the Mongolian цагаан (tsagaan, meaning white) and the Greek δέλτᾰ (delta, meaning crest or point-shaped) in reference to the withish sediments at the Tsagan Tsonj locality and the prominent dentition of the Deltatheroida. The specific name, dashzevegi, is in honor to the Mongolian paleontologist Demberlyin Dashzeveg who did notable research on early mammals.

== Description ==
Tsagandelta is currently known from one specimen, the holotype PSS-MAE 629. This specimen is composed of a left dentary fragment containing an almost intact second molar, the base of the third molar and the roots of the first premolar; various other tooth sockets are empty, and the dental formula is probably similar to that of Deltatheridium. Based on comparisons with the related Lotheridium, the preserved dentary indicates that Tsagandelta was slightly smaller than the former; Lotheridium is about the size of a modern marten.

== Classification ==
Tsagandelta was classified within the Deltatheridiidae, being more derived than Sulestes and Oklatheridium but less so than the rest of the family. This phylogenetic position has been argued to suggest an Asian origin for Deltatheroida.

== Paleobiology ==
Like most deltatheroideans, Tsagandelta was a carnivore, its molar anatomy similar to the carnassials of other carnivorous therians. Tsagandelta and its relatives (as well as the unrelated eutriconodonts) are among the Mesozoic mammals most clearly specialised to meat-eating.

== Paleoecology ==
Tsagandelta hails from the Bayan Shireh Formation, dating from the Cenomanian to the Santonian. It is adjacent to the Iren Dabasu Formation, these formations bear a very similar fauna. A great diversity of reptiles are known from the Bayan Shireh Formation, mainly compromising dinosaur and non-dinosaur taxa that likely preyed on Tsagandelta, mammals however, are pooly known from this formation.
