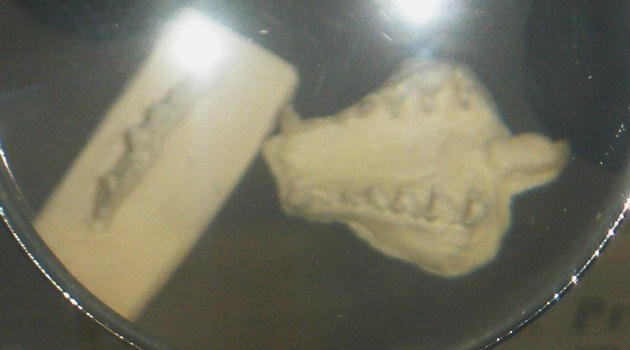
- Deltatheridium praetrituberculare
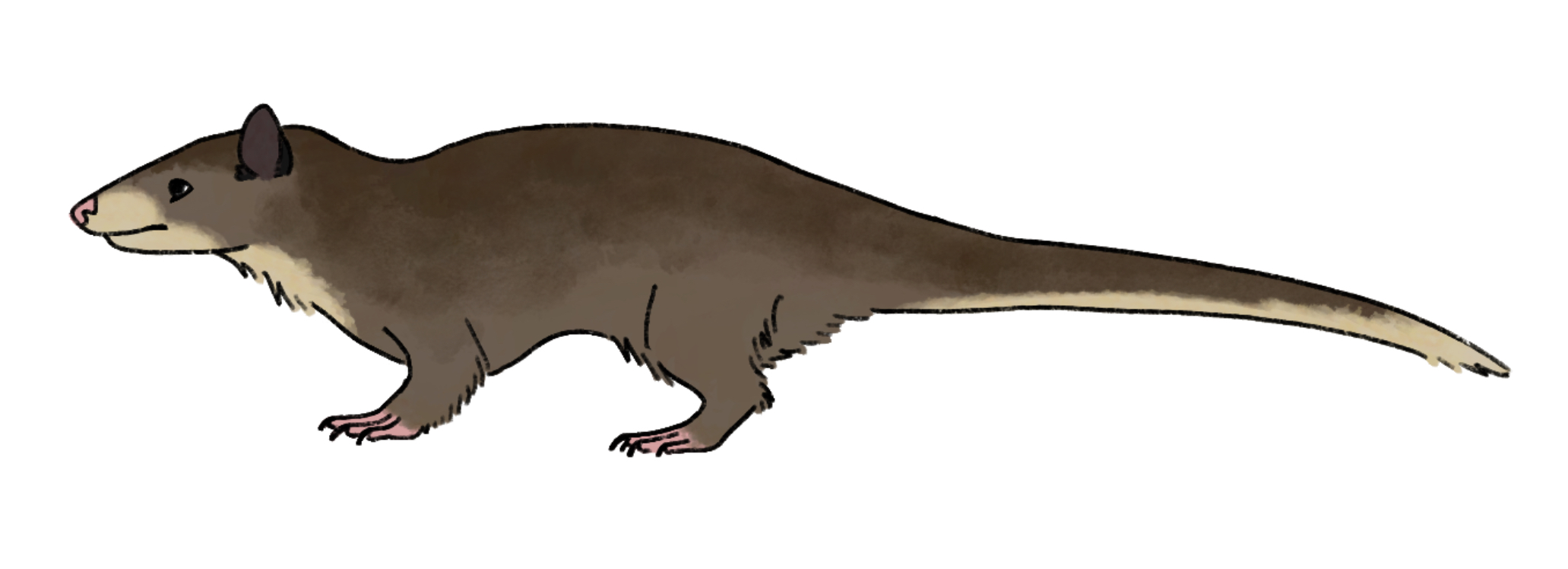
- A hypothetical life restoration of Sulestes karakshi

Scientific classification
- Kingdom: Animalia
- Phylum: Chordata
- Class: Mammalia
- Infraclass: Marsupialia (?)
- Order: †Deltatheroida
- Family: †Deltatheridiidae; Gregory & Simpson, 1926

Type genus
- Deltatheridium Gregory & Simpson, 1926

Genera
- See text

Synonyms
- Deltatheroididae Kielan-Jaworowska & Nessov, 1990; Nanocuridae Fox, Scott & Bryant, 2007

= Deltatheridiidae =

Deltatheridiidae Temporal range: Barremian – Paleocene Early Cretaceous-Paleocene

Extinct family of mammals

Deltatheridiidae is an extinct family of basal carnivorous metatherians that lived during the Cretaceous and Paleogene. They were closely related to marsupials. Their fossils are restricted to Central Asia (Mongolia and Uzbekistan) and North America (United States - Oklahoma, Texas, Utah, Wyoming). They mostly disappeared in the KT event, but a ghost lineage, currently represented by Gurbanodelta, survived until the late Paleocene by decreasing in size and becoming insectivorous.

The family consist in six genera:

- Atokatheridium Kielan-Jaworowska & Cifelli, 2001
- Deltatheridium Gregory & Simpson, 1926
- Deltatheroides Gregory & Simpson, 1926
- Gurbanodelta X. Ni et al. 2016
- Lotheridium S. Bi et al. 2015
- Oklatheridium Davis, Cifelli & Kielan-Jaworowska, 2008
- Nanocuris Fox, Scott & Bryant, 2007
- Sulestes Nessov, 1985
- Tsagandelta G. W. Rougier et al. 2015
