= Aitym Formation =

Geological formation in Uzbekistan

- Stratigraphic range: ?Santonian; ~86–83 Ma
- Type: Geological formation
- Overlies: Bissekty Formation
- Area: Kyzylkum Desert
- Thickness: up to

Location
- Aitym Formation (Uzbekistan)

The Aitym Formation is a geological formation in Uzbekistan which possibly dates to the Santonian stage of the Late Cretaceous period.

The formation has not been precisely dated. However, certain fossils suggest the formation was deposited during the Santonian stage of the Late Cretaceous period.

== Fossil content ==
A diverse fauna has been unearthed from the Aitym Formation including oysters, ammonites and many marine vertebrates, including an abundant assemblage of chondrichthyans (cartilaginous fish), a rarer assemblage of osteichthyans (bony fish), and rather infrequent finds of plesiosaurs, and sea turtles. Terrestrial vertebrate remains are extremely rare in the formation. A few bones of salamanders, lizards, crocodiles, possibly terrestrial turtle remains, dinosaurs (including birds), and mammals have been found in the formation.

| Color key: Taxon / Reclassified taxon / Taxon falsely reported as present / Dubious taxon or junior synonym / Ichnotaxon / Ootaxon / Morphotaxon | Notes; Uncertain or tentative taxa are in small text; ~~crossed out~~ taxa are discredited. |

=== Mammals ===
Mammals of the Aitym Formation
| Genus | Species | Location | Notes | Images |
|---|---|---|---|---|
| Uzbekbaatar | U. wardi | | A cimolodontan multituberculate | |
| Shalbaatar | cf. S. sp. | | A spalacotheriid symmetrodont | |
| Deltatherus | cf. D. sp. | | A deltatheroidan; reclassified later as Sulestes, as the two genera have been synonymized | |
| Daulestes | aff. D. sp | | A asioryctithere | |
| Kulbeckia | Kulbeckia sp. cf. K. kulbecke | | A possible zalambdalestid | |
| Kulbeckia | aff. Kulbeckia sp. | | A possible zalambdalestid | |
| Paranyctoides | Paranyctoides sp. cf. P. aralensis | | A possible lipotyphlan | |
| Paranyctoides | Paranyctoides sp. | | A possible lipotyphlan | |
| Eoungulatum | E. sp. cf. E. kudukensis | | Zhelestid ungulatomorphs | |
| Parazhelestes | P. sp. cf. P. robustus | | Zhelestid ungulatomorphs | |
| Parazhelestes | P. sp. aff. P. minor | | Zhelestid ungulatomorphs | |
| Aspanlestes | cf. A. sp. | | Zhelestid ungulatomorphs | |

=== Molluscs ===
Molluscs of the Aitym Formation
| Genus | Species | Location | Notes | Images |
|---|---|---|---|---|
| Placenticeras | P. kyzylkumense | | A placenticeratid ammonite | |

=== Amphibians ===
Amphibians of the Aitym Formation
| Genus | Species | Location | Notes | Images |
|---|---|---|---|---|
| Eoscapherpeton | E. asiaticum | | A giant salamander | |
