= Protalphadon =

Protalphadon Temporal range: Cenomanian-Maastrichtian 99.6–66 Ma

Scientific classification
- Domain: Eukaryota
- Kingdom: Animalia
- Phylum: Chordata
- Class: Mammalia
- Clade: Metatheria
- Genus: †Protalphadon; Cifelli, 1990

Type species
- Alphadon lulli Clemens, 1966

Species
- P. foxi Johanson, 1996; P. lulli Clemens, 1966

Synonyms
- Alphadon lulli Clemens, 1966

Extinct genus of mammals

Protalphadon is a genus of small mammal from the Late Cretaceous. Its fossils are found in Utah, Montana, New Jersey, South Dakota, Wyoming and Colorado. Originally the genus was assigned to Alphadon.

== Description ==
Protalphadon is known from a few fossils but mainly teeth. It was likely omnivorous.
