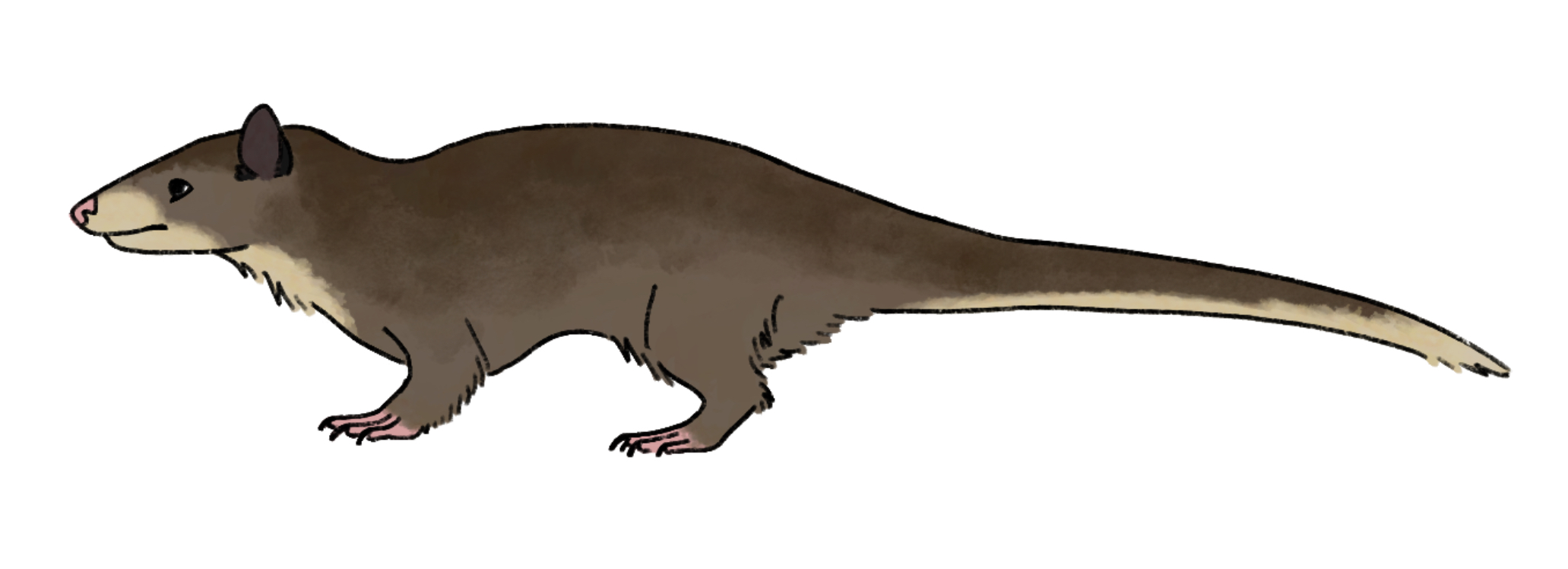
- Sulestes reconstruction

Scientific classification
- Kingdom: Animalia
- Phylum: Chordata
- Class: Mammalia
- Infraclass: Marsupialia (?)
- Order: †Deltatheroida; Gregory and Simpson, 1926

Families and genera
- Pappotheriidae; Pappotherium; Deltatheridiidae; Atokatheridium; Deltatheridium; Deltatheroides; Gurbanodelta; Lotheridium; Nanocuris; Oklatheridium; Sulestes; Tsagandelta

= Deltatheroida =

Deltatheroida Temporal range: Aptian–Paleocene Early Cretaceous-Paleocene

Extinct order of mammals

Deltatheroida is an extinct group of basal metatherians that were either distant relatives of modern marsupials or true marsupials themselves. The majority of known members of the group lived in the Cretaceous; one species, Gurbanodelta kara, is known from the late Paleocene (Gashatan) of China. Their fossils are restricted to Central Asia and North America. This order can be defined as all metatherians closer to Deltatheridium than to Marsupialia. However, a 2022 study strongly suggest that Deltatheridium, a member of the Deltatheroida, was the earliest known crown group Marsupialia, possibly making the order a crown group marsupial as well.

When they were first identified in the 1920s, they were believed to be placentals and possible ancestors of the "creodonts" (a polyphyletic group of extinct carnivorous mammals from the Paleogene and Miocene), but this was later disproven. Nonetheless, deltatheroideans do converge on hyaenodontids, oxyaenids, carnivorans, dasyuromorphs, thylacoleonids and sparassodonts in many details of their dental anatomy, suggesting a carnivorous lifestyle.

== Taxonomy ==
The following is a species list of Deltatheroida.

†Deltatheroida Kielan-Jaworowska 1982 [Deltatheralia Marshall & Kielan-Jaworowska 1992; Holarctidelphia Szalay 1993]

- †Archetheridium Wang & Wang, 2026
- †Pappotheriidae
  - †Pappotherium
- †Deltatheridiidae Gregory & Simpson 1926 [Deltatheridia Van Valen 1965; Nanocuridae Fox, Scott & Bryant 2007; Sulestinae Nessov 1985; Deltatheroididae Kielan-Jaworowska & Nesov 1990]
  - †Hyotheridium dobsoni Gregory & Simpson 1926
  - †Lotheridium mengi Bi et al. 2015
  - †Nanocuris improvida Fox, Scott & Bryant 2007
  - †Prodeltitheridium kalandadze Trofimov 1984
  - †Oklatheridium Davis, Cifelli & Kielan-Jaworowska 2008
    - †O. szalayi Davis, Cifelli & Kielan-Jaworowska 2008
    - †O. minax Davis & Cifelli 2011
    - †O. wiblei Cifelli & Davis 2015
  - †Atokatheridium boreni Kielan-Jaworowska & Cifelli 2001
  - †Deltatheridium Gregory & Simpson 1926
    - †D. pretrituberculare Gregory & Simpson 1926
    - †D. nesovi Averianov 1997
  - †Sulestes karakshi Nesov 1985 [Deltatherus Nesov 1997; Marsasia Nesov 1997; Deltatheroides kizylkumensis Nesov 1993; Deltatherus kizylkumensis (Nesov 1993) Nesov 1997; Marsasia aenigma Nesov 1997]
  - †Tsagandelta dashzevegi Rougier, Davis & Novacek 2015
  - †Deltatheroides cretacicus Gregory & Simpson 1926
  - †Gurbanodelta kara Ni et al. 2016

== Biology ==
Deltatheroideans are thought to be carnivorous mammals, converging on hyaenodontids, oxyaenids, carnivorans, dasyuromorphs and sparassodonts in many details of their dental anatomy, suggesting a carnivorous lifestyle.

Deltatheroideans in this regard appear to have replaced eutriconodont mammals as the dominant carnivorous mammals of the Mesozoic, either directly through competition or occupying vacant ecological niches; in North America, Nanocuris came to succeed the larger gobiconodontids and Jugulator, while in Asia the Early Cretaceous gobiconodontid radiation is replaced in the Late Cretaceous by a deltatheroidean one. Given that all insectivorous and carnivorous mammals groups suffered heavy losses during the mid-Cretaceous, it seems likely these metatherians simply occupied niches left after the extinction of most eutriconodonts.

Evidence of direct predation on dinosaurs may be attested on a skull belonging to Archaeornithoides, which seems to have been punctured by Deltatheridium teeth and later healed.

== See also ==
- Asiadelphia
- Marsupial
