= Gurbanodelta =

Gurbanodelta Temporal range: Late Paleocene ~56 Ma

Scientific classification
- Kingdom: Animalia
- Phylum: Chordata
- Class: Mammalia
- Order: †Deltatheroida
- Family: †Deltatheridiidae
- Genus: †Gurbanodelta; Xinjun Ni et al, 2016

Species
- G. kara

Extinct genus of mammals

Gurbanodelta kara is an extinct genus of metatherian mammal. A deltatheroid, it represents the geologically youngest member of this clade, dating to the late Paleocene of China.

== Description ==
Gurbanodelta kata is known from upper molars. They are the smallest sized among deltatheroideans, suggesting that it was a small, shrew-sized mammal.

== Classification ==
Gurbanodelta kara nests deeply within Deltatheridiidae. Its closest relative is the largest known deltatheroidean, Nanocuris.

== Size reduction ==
Deltatheroideans are relatively large carnivorous mammals. By contrast, Gurbanodelta kara is a small sized species. This indicates a size reduction that potentially allowed it to survive the KT event, likely switching to an insectivorous diet.
