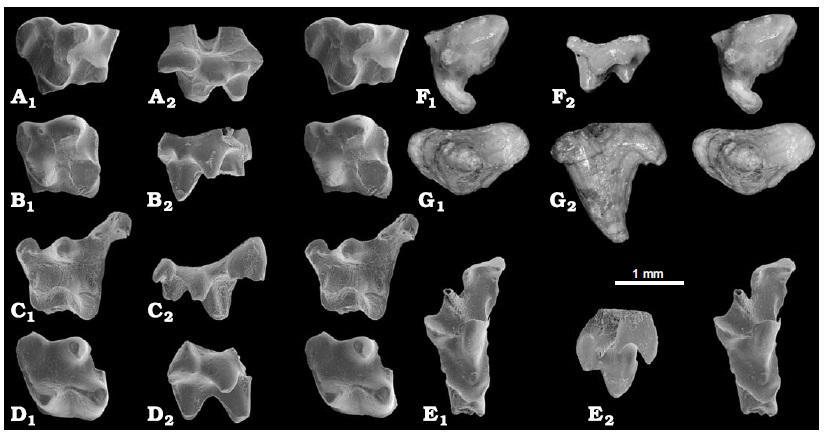
- Teeth of Holoclemensia

Scientific classification
- Domain: Eukaryota
- Kingdom: Animalia
- Phylum: Chordata
- Class: Mammalia
- Clade: Metatheria; Slaughter, 1968
- Genus: †Holoclemensia; Slaughter, 1968

Type species
- †Holoclemensia texana Slaughter, 1968

Synonyms
- Clemensia Slaughter, 1968; Comanchea Jacobs et al 1989

= Holoclemensia =

Holoclemensia Temporal range: Early Cretaceous (Aptian-Albian) 110–100 Ma

Extinct genus of mammals

Holoclemensia is an extinct genus of mammal of uncertain phylogenetic placement. It lived during the Early Cretaceous and its fossil remains were discovered in Texas.

== Description ==
This genus is only known from a few isolated teeth. The upper molars had a paracone larger than the metacone, and a stylar platform with stylar cusps. The lower molars had a high protoconid, a small paraconid, and the hypoconulid and entoconid were close.

== Classification ==
First described in 1968 by Slaughter, Holoclemensia texana is only known from a few teeth found in the Trinity Formation, in Texas. Slaughter initially described the remains under the name Clemensia, but this name was already in use for a genus of moths and the genus was renamed Holoclemensia. It was initially considered to be a basal marsupial, then was approached of the so-called group "Tribotheria", was later reconsidered as a marsupial, and was finally placed as a basal member of Metatheria. Despite its uncertain classification, Holoclemensia was probably close to the point where Metatherians and Eutherians diverged from each other.

== References and Bibliography ==
- Slaughter, B. H. 1968. Earliest known marsupials. Science 162:254-255
- Slaughter, B. H. 1968. Holoclemensia instead of Clemensia. Science 162:1306
- Davis, B.M. and Cifelli, R.L. 2011. Reappraisal of the tribosphenidan mammals from the Trinity Group (Aptian–Albian) of Texas and Oklahoma. Acta Palaeontologica Polonica 56 (3): 441–462.
