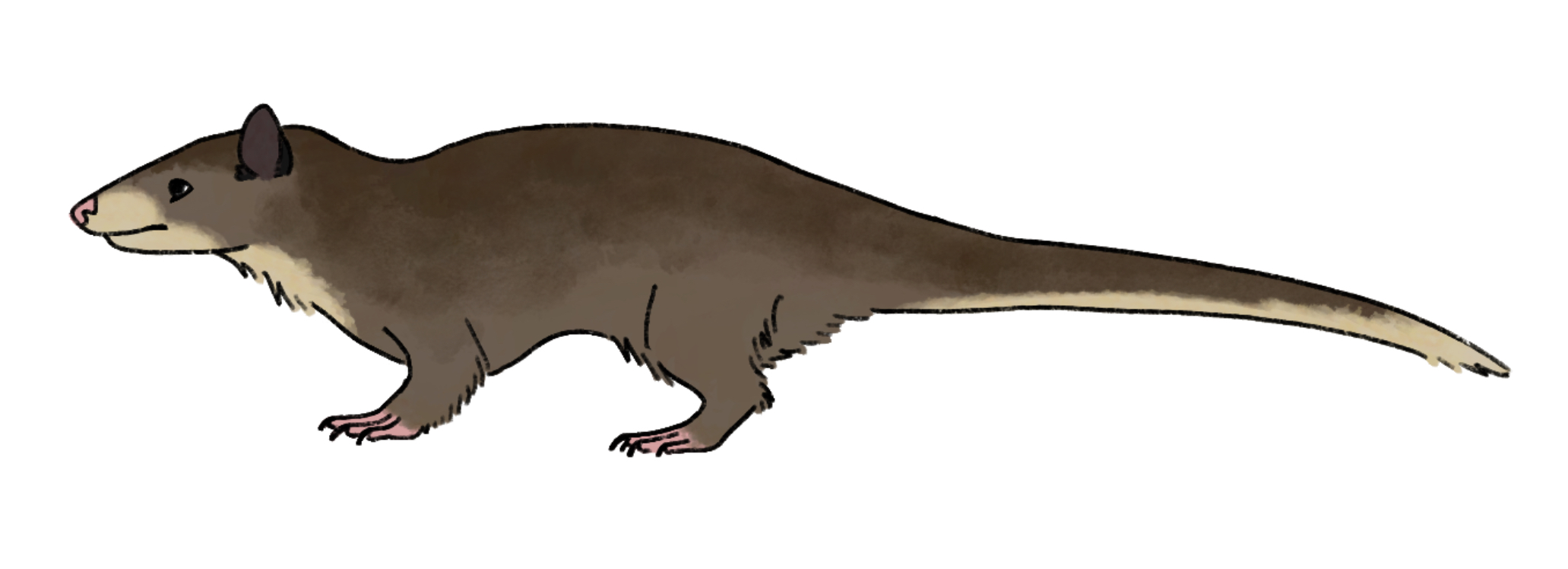
- A hypothetical life restoration of Sulestes karakshi.

Scientific classification
- Domain: Eukaryota
- Kingdom: Animalia
- Phylum: Chordata
- Class: Mammalia
- Order: †Deltatheroida
- Family: †Deltatheridiidae
- Genus: †Sulestes; Nessov, 1985

Species
- Sulestes karakshi Nessov 1985

Synonyms
- Deltatherus Nessov, 1997; Marsasia Nessov, 1997

= Sulestes =

Sulestes Temporal range: Late Cretaceous(Turonian to Santonian) ~92–83 Ma

Extinct genus of mammals

Sulestes is an extinct genus of Deltatheridiidae from Cretaceous period. It has only been recovered from the Bissekty and Aitym Formations in Uzbekistan.

== Description ==
Sulestes is known from several jaw bones and teeth. Its holotype CCMGE 35/12000 consists of a left maxilla fragment with the first two molars. Significantly more material was referred to the genus in 2010 that included a right maxilla and several right and left dentary fragments.

The genus and the Deltatheridiidae family as a whole are thought to be predators.

== Classification ==
The following cladogram is modified from Averianov et al., 2010:

- Deltatheroida
  - Oklatheridium
  - Deltatheridiidae
    - Sulestes
    - Deltatheridium
    - Deltatheroides
