= Nanocuris =

Nanocuris Temporal range: Late Cretaceous (Maastrichtian) 72.1–70.6 Ma

Scientific classification
- Kingdom: Animalia
- Phylum: Chordata
- Class: Mammalia
- Order: †Deltatheroida
- Family: †Deltatheridiidae
- Genus: †Nanocuris; Fox, Scott & Bryant, 2007
- Species: †N. improvida

Binomial name
- †Nanocuris improvida Fox, Scott & Bryant, 2007

Extinct genus of mammals

Nanocuris is an extinct genus of Deltatheridiidae from the Cretaceous of Canada (Saskatchewan) and United States (Wyoming - Lance Formation and Hell Creek Formation). Initially, it was classified in a proper family, Nanocuridae, in the clade Eutheria, but a reanalysis of a new specimen revealed a delthatheroid affinity of the genus.

== Size ==
It was the largest deltatheroidean. Alongside with the similarly sized Altacreodus, it likely replaced earlier Cretaceous eutriconodonts as a large sized predatory mammal.

== Classification ==
Its closest relative is the smallest deltatheroidean, Gurbanodelta.
