= Atokatheridium =

Atokatheridium Temporal range: Aptian–Albian

Scientific classification
- Kingdom: Animalia
- Phylum: Chordata
- Class: Mammalia
- Order: †Deltatheroida
- Family: †Deltatheridiidae
- Genus: †Atokatheridium; Kielan-Jaworowska & Cifelli, 2001
- Species: †A. boreni

Binomial name
- †Atokatheridium boreni Kielan-Jaworowska & Cifelli, 2001

Extinct genus of mammals

Atokatheridium is an extinct genus of Deltatheridiidae from the Cretaceous of United States.
