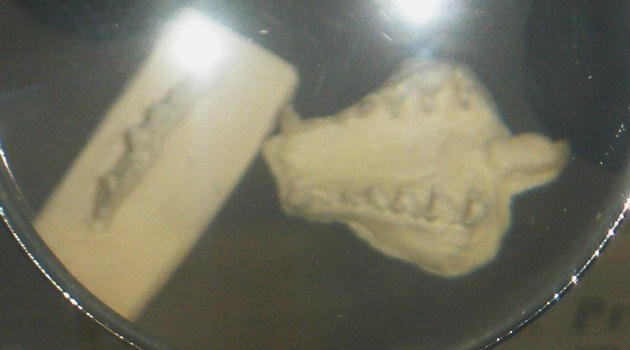
- Deltatheridium pretrituberculare
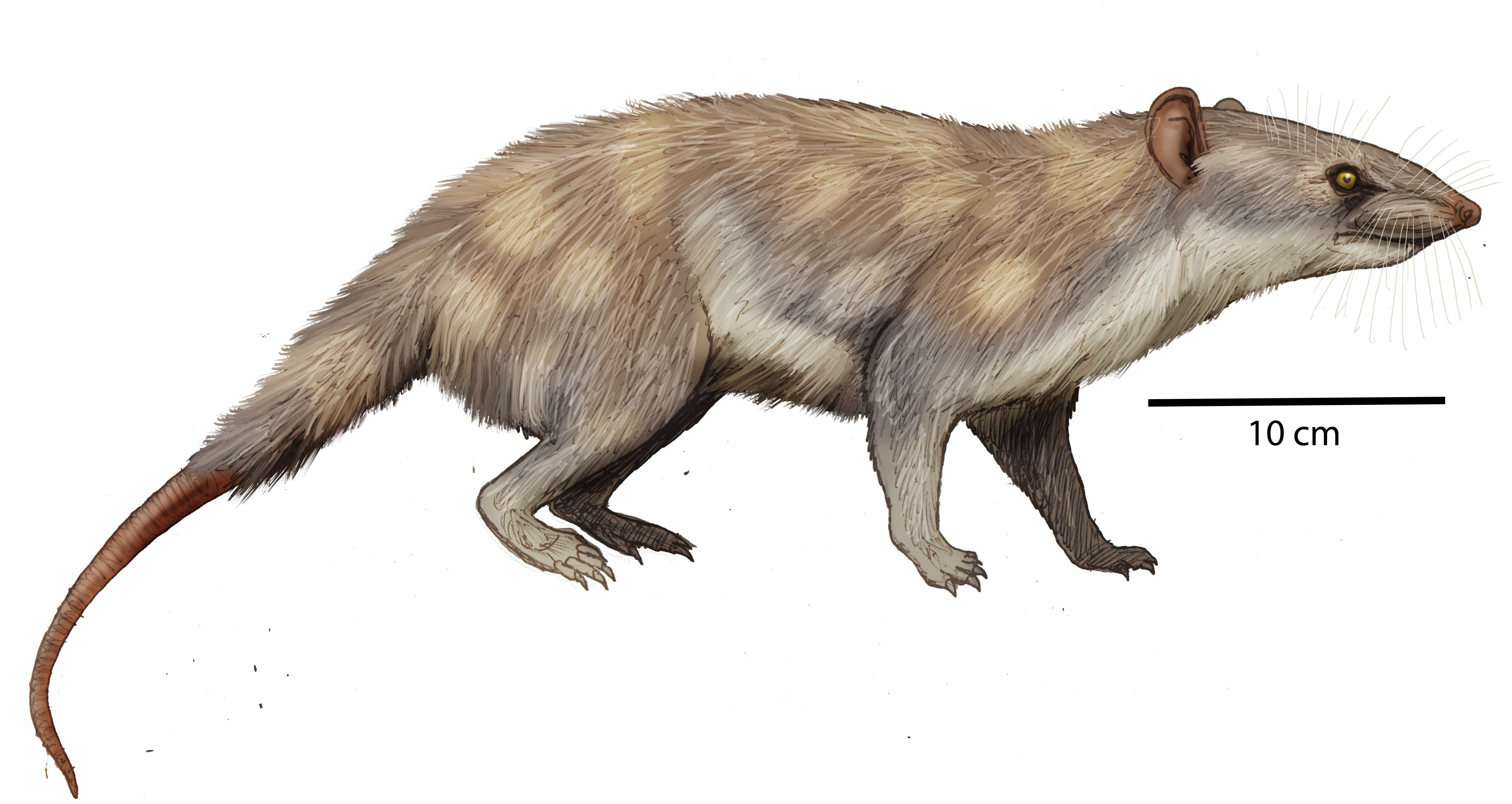
- Life restoration

Scientific classification
- Kingdom: Animalia
- Phylum: Chordata
- Class: Mammalia
- Infraclass: Marsupialia (?)
- Order: †Deltatheroida
- Family: †Deltatheridiidae
- Genus: †Deltatheridium; Gregory & Simpson, 1926

Species
- D. pretrituberculare (type); D. nessovi

= Deltatheridium =

Deltatheridium Temporal range: Santonian-Maastrichtian ~84.9–70.6 Ma

Extinct genus of mammals

Deltatheridium (meaning triangle beast or delta beast) is an extinct species of metatherian. It lived in what is now Mongolia during the Upper Cretaceous, circa 80 million years ago. A study in 2022 strongly suggested that Deltatheridium was a marsupial, making it the earliest known member of this group.

It had a length of about 15 cm (5.9 in). Its teeth indicate it was carnivorous. One specimen of Archaeornithoides might attest to an attack by this mammal, the skull bearing tooth marks that match its teeth.

== Other Mesozoic mammals from Mongolia ==
- Kamptobaatar
- Zalambdalestes
