= Deltatheroides =

Deltatheroides Temporal range: Campanian–Maastrichtian

Scientific classification
- Kingdom: Animalia
- Phylum: Chordata
- Class: Mammalia
- Order: †Deltatheroida
- Family: †Deltatheridiidae
- Genus: †Deltatheroides; Gregory & Simpson, 1926

Species
- Deltatheroides cretacicus Gregory & Simpson, 1926

Extinct genus of mammals

Deltatheroides is an extinct genus of Deltatheridiidae from Cretaceous of Mongolia. Another specimen found in Wyoming is suspected to belong to this genus.
