= Oklatheridium =

Oklatheridium Temporal range: 125–101 Ma

Scientific classification
- Domain: Eukaryota
- Kingdom: Animalia
- Phylum: Chordata
- Class: Mammalia
- Order: †Deltatheroida
- Family: †Deltatheridiidae
- Genus: †Oklatheridium; Davis, Cifelli & Kielan-Jaworowska, 2008

Species
- †O. minax Davis & Cifelli, 2011; †O. szalayi Davis, Cifelli & Kielan-Jaworowska, 2008

Extinct genus of mammals

Oklatheridium is an extinct genus of deltatheroidan from the United States.
