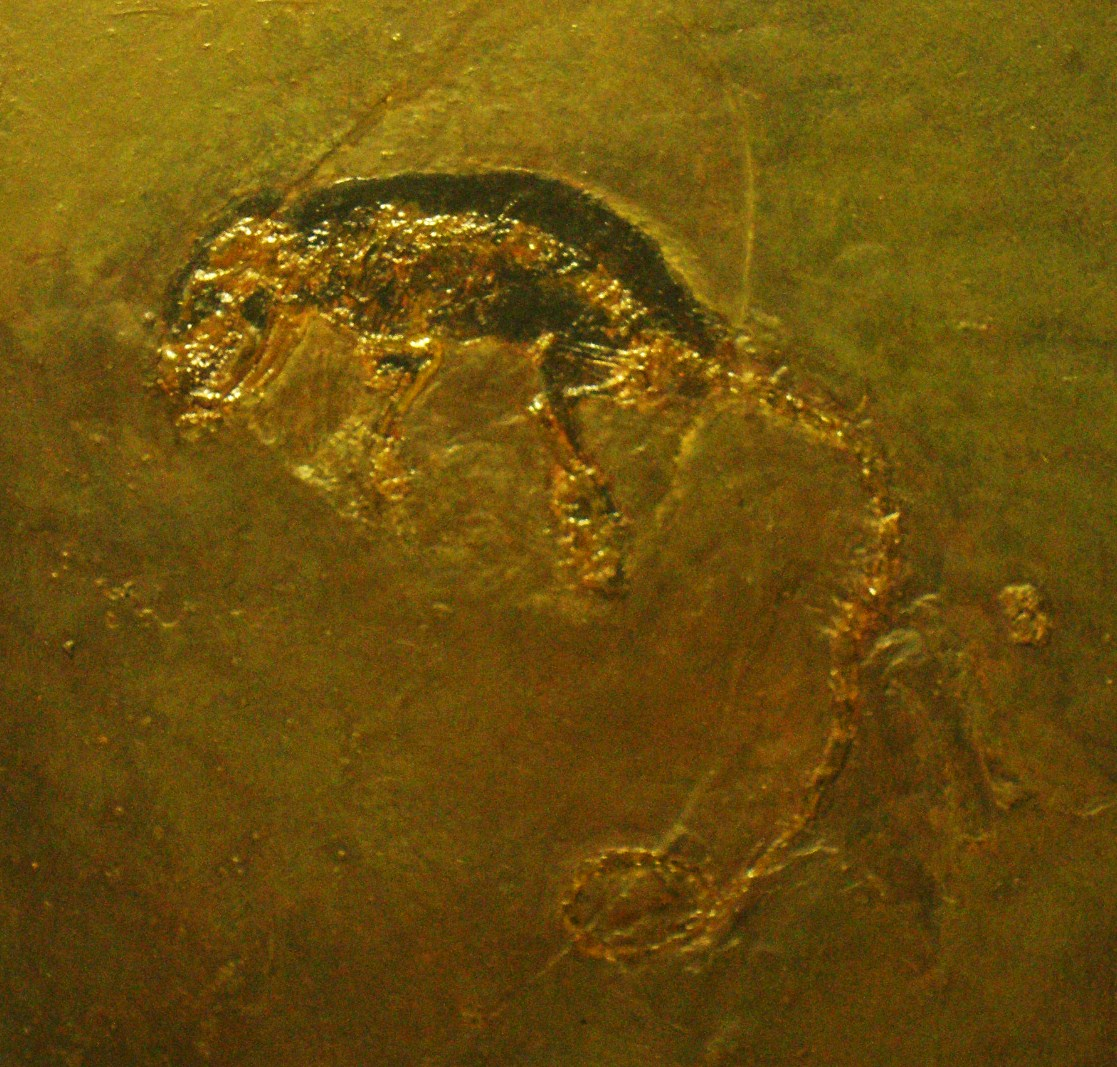
- Fossil of Peradectes
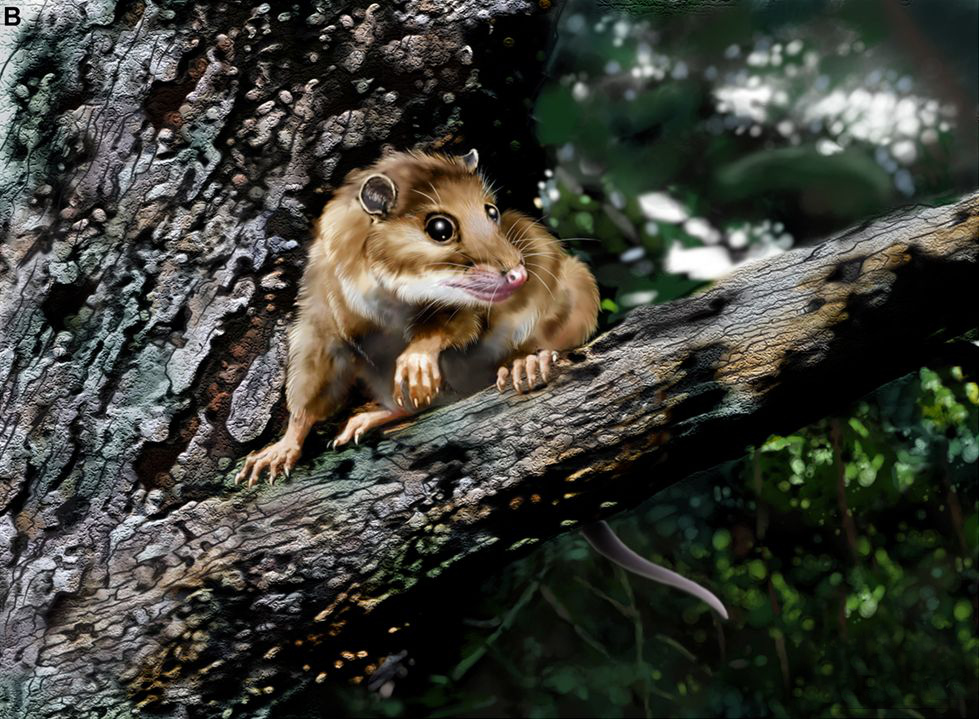
- Life restoration of Mimoperadectes

Scientific classification
- Kingdom: Animalia
- Phylum: Chordata
- Class: Mammalia
- Clade: Metatheria
- Family: †Peradectidae; Crochet, 1979

Genera
- Peradectes; Mimoperadectes; Armintodelphys; Didelphidectes; Europeradectes; Nanodelphys; Siamoperadectes?; Sinoperadectes?; Maastrichtidelphys?; Pucadelphys?; Szalinia?

= Peradectidae =

Peradectidae Temporal range: Paleocene–Early Oligocene

Extinct family of mammals

Peradectidae is a family of small metatherian mammals, spanning from the Paleocene (or possibly Latest Cretaceous) to the Oligocene and possibly the Miocene. Fossils are known from the Northern Hemisphere, including Europe, North America and possibly Asia. The monophyly of the group has been questioned, with some authors suggesting that Peradectes should be the only genus placed in the family, though a 2026 study recovered a core grouping of peradectids as monophyletic, including Peradectes (which is paraphyletic), Golerdelphys, Europeradectes, Mimoperadectes, Armintodelphys, Nanodelphys and Didelphidectes, spanning from the Paleocene to Early Oligocene of North America and early Eocene of Europe. The morphology of peradectids has been considered to be similar to opossums, with at least some exhibiting morphology suggesting a tree dwelling arboreal/scansorial lifestyle. Their diet is suggested to have included insects and fruit. The youngest representatives of the family have been suggested to be Siamoperadectes and Sinoperadectes from the Early Miocene of China and Thailand, but their placement as peradectids and even as metatherians has been questioned, with a 2026 study suggesting that they were eutherians instead.

Phylogenetic analysis suggest that they are less closely related to modern marsupials than herpetotheriids are.

Cladogram after Ladevèze et al 2020:

- Metatheria
  - vDeltatheriidae
  - - †Kokopellia
    - - †Asiatherium
      - - †Peradectidae
        - - †Stagodontidae
          - - - †Pucadelphyidae
              - †Sparassodonta
            - - - †Amphiperatherium
                - †Peratherium
              - - †Herpetotherium
                - Marsupialia

Cladogram after Gernelle et al. 2026:

- Metatheria
  - †Deltatheridiidae
  - Marsupaliformes
    - †Kokopellia
    - - †Aenigmadelphys
      - - ††Alphadontidae
        - - - †Stagodontidae (Didelphodon)
            - - †Pediomyididae (Pediomys)
              - †Glasbiidae (Glasbius)
          - Notometatheria
            - - †Polydolopimorphia
              - - †Sparassodonta
                - †Pucadelphyoidea (Pucadelphys+Incadelphys)
            - - †Thylacodon
              - - - †Swaindelphys
                  - - †Peratherium
                    - - †Anatoliadelphyidae
                      - - †"Herpetotherium" edwardi
                        - †Herpetotherium fugax
                        - - †Derorhynchus
                          - Marsupialia
                - †Peradectidae
                  - †"Peradectes" minor
                  - - †"Peradectes" coprexeches
                    - - †Golerdelphys
                      - - †Peradectes elegans
                        - - †"Peradectes" protinnominatus
                          - - †Europeradectes
                            - - †Mimoperadectes
                              - - †Armintodelphys
                                - - †"Peradectes" chesteri
                                  - - †"Peradectes" gulottai
                                    - †"Peradectes" californicus
                                    - †Didelphidectes
                                    - †Nanodelphys
