= Albertatherium =

Albertatherium Temporal range: Late Cretaceous, 86.3–83.5 Ma

Scientific classification
- Kingdom: Animalia
- Phylum: Chordata
- Class: Mammalia
- Family: †Alphadontidae
- Genus: †Albertatherium; Fox, 1971

Type species
- †Albertatherium primus Fox, 1971

Species
- †A. primus Fox 1971; †A. secundus Johanson 1995

Extinct genus of mammals

Albertatherium (meaning "beast of Alberta") is an extinct genus of alphadontid metatherians that lived during the Late Cretaceous of North America. The genus contains two species, Albertatherium primus (the type species), and Albertatherium secundus. Fossils have been found in the Eagle Formation of Montana and the Milk River Formation of Alberta.

== Taxonomy ==
Albertatherium is a member of the Alphadontidae, an extinct family of metatherians closely related to marsupials. Recent phylogenetic studies group it with other northern non-marsupial metatherians such as Alphadon and Turgidodon. A 2016 phylogenetic analysis is shown below.

- Marsupialiformes
  - - Gurlin Tsav skull
    - - Borhyaenidae
      - - Mayulestes
        - - Jaskhadelphys
          - - Andinodelphys
            - Pucadelphys
  - - Asiatherium
    - - - Iugomortiferum
        - Kokopellia
      - Aenigmadelphys
      - Anchistodelphys
      - - Glasbiidae
          Glasbius
        - Pediomyidae
          Pediomys
      - Stagodontidae
        - Pariadens
        - - Eodelphis
          - Didelphodon
      - Alphadontidae
        - Turgidodon
        - Alphadon
        - Albertatherium
      - Marsupialia
