= Polydolopimorphia =

Polydolopimorphia Temporal range: Paleocene– Pliocene, 66–2.6 Ma
- Argyrolagus palmeri

Scientific classification
- Kingdom: Animalia
- Phylum: Chordata
- Class: Mammalia
- Clade: Metatheria
- Clade: Marsupialiformes
- Order: †Polydolopimorphia; Archer, 1984

Subgroups
- †Apeirodon?; †Pujatodon?; †Bonapartheriiformes; †Polydolopiformes

Extinct order of mammals

Polydolopimorphia is an extinct order of metatherians, closely related to extant marsupials. Known from the Paleocene–Pliocene of South America and the Eocene of Antarctica, they were a diverse group during the Paleogene, filling many niches, before declining and becoming extinct at the end of the Neogene. It is divided into two suborders, Bonapartheriiformes, and Polydolopiformes Most members are only known from jaw fragments, which have their characteristically generally bunodont teeth. The morphology of their teeth has led to proposals that polydolopimorphians may be crown group marsupials, nested within Australidelphia, though this proposal, has been questioned, with other analyses finding them outside of crown-group Marsupialia. The monophyly of the group has been questioned, due to the possibility of the characteristic bunodont teeth emerging convergently in unrelated groups, rather than reflecting a true phylogenetic relationship. The group contained omnivorous, frugivorous and herbivorous forms.

== Taxonomy ==
Taxonomical subdivision of the Polydolopimorphia:

- Suborder Bonapartheriiformes
  - Family Bonapartheriidae Pascual 1980
    - Genus Bonapartherium Pascual 1980
    - Genus Epidolops Paula Couto 1952
  - Family Argyrolagidae Ameghino 1904
    - Genus Anargyrolagus Carlini et al. 2007
    - Genus Argyrolagus Ameghino 1904
    - Genus Collonlagus Abello et al. 2026
    - Genus Hondalagus Villarroel & Marshall 1988
    - Genus Klohnia Flynn & Wyss 1999
    - Genus Microtragulus Ameghino 1904
    - Genus Lelvunlagus Abello et al. 2026
    - Genus Proargyrolagus Wolff 1984
    - Genus Sallalagus Abello et al. 2026
  - Subfamily Chulpasiinae Sigé et al. 2009
    - Genus Chulpasia Crochet & Sigé 1993
    - Genus Thylacotinga Archer et al. 1993
  - Family Prepidolopidae Pascual 1980
    - Genus Incadolops Goin & Candela 2004
    - Genus Perrodelphys Goin et al. 1999
    - Genus Punadolops Goin et al. 1998
  - Family Rosendolopidae Goin et al. 2010
    - Genus Hondonadia Goin & Candela 1998
    - Genus Rosendolops Goin & Candela 1996
- Suborder Polydolopiformes
  - Family Polydolopidae Ameghino 1897
    - Genus Amphidolops Ameghino 1902
    - Genus Antarctodolops Woodburne & Zinsmeister 1984
    - Genus Archaeodolops Ameghino 1903
    - Genus Hypodolops Chornogubsky 2020
    - Genus Kramadolops Goin et al. 2010
    - Genus Pliodolops Ameghino 1902
    - Genus Polydolops Ameghino 1897
    - Genus Pseudolops Ameghino 1902
  - Family Sillustaniidae Crochet & Sigé 1996
    - Genus Sillustania Crochet & Sigé 1996
    - Genus Roberthoffstetteria Marshall et al. 1983
- incertae sedis
  - Genus Prepidolops Pascual 1980
  - Genus Wamradolops Goin & Candela 2004
  - Genus Bobbschaefferia Paula Couto 1970

Cladogram after Gernelle et al. 2026:

- Metatheria
  - †Deltatheridiidae
  - Marsupaliformes
    - †Kokopellia
    - - †Aenigmadelphys
      - - †Alphadontidae
        - - - †Stagodontidae (Didelphodon)
            - - †Pediomyididae (Pediomys)
              - †Glasbiidae (Glasbius)
          - Notometatheria
            - - †Polydolopimorphia
              - - †Sparassodonta
                - †Pucadelphyoidea (Pucadelphys+Incadelphys)
            - - †Thylacodon
              - - - †Swaindelphys
                  - - †Peratherium
                    - - †Anatoliadelphyidae
                      - - †"Herpetotherium" edwardi
                        - †Herpetotherium fugax
                        - - †Derorhynchus
                          - Marsupialia
                - †Peradectidae
