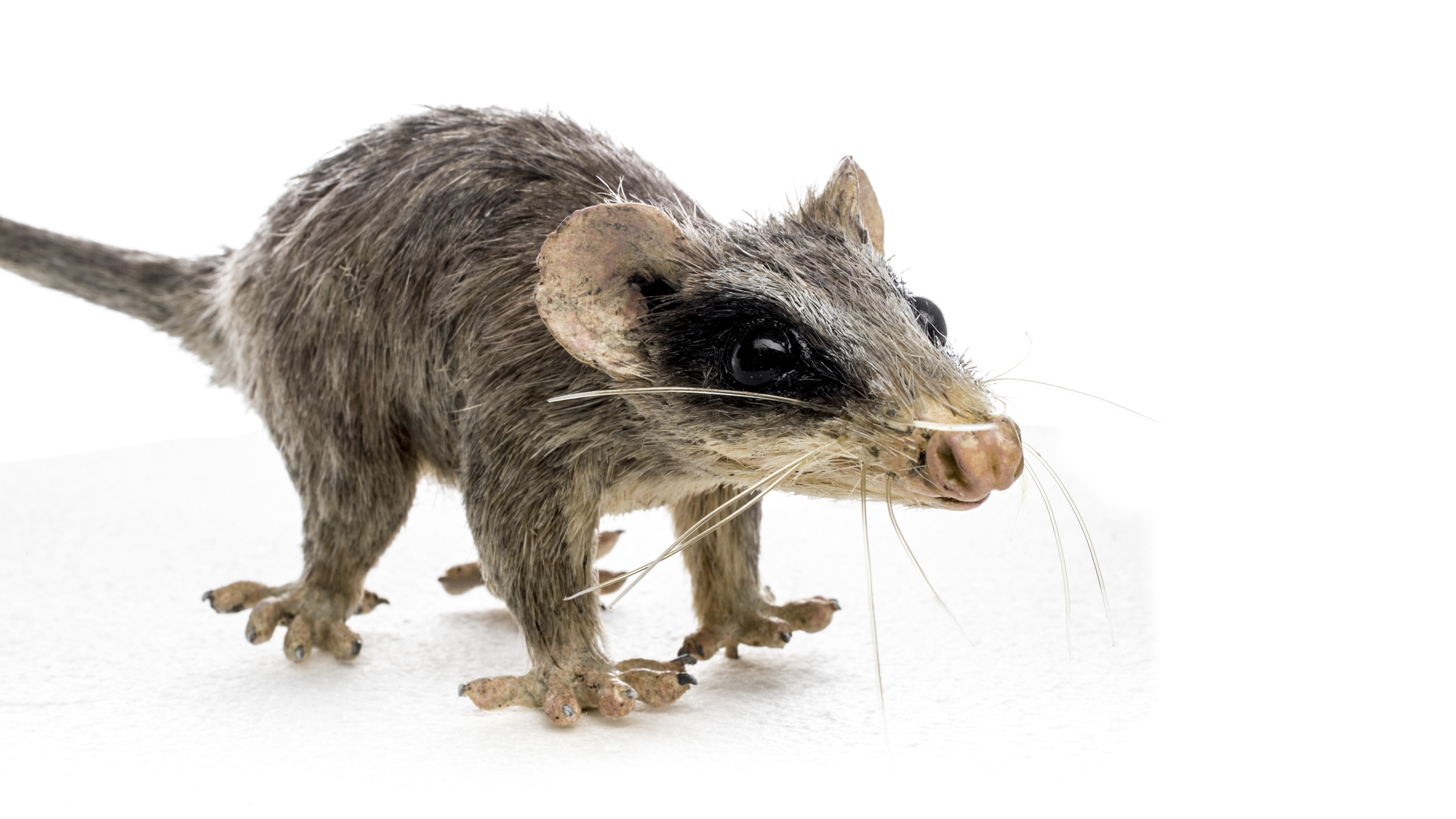
- Reconstruction of Alphadon sp.

Scientific classification
- Kingdom: Animalia
- Phylum: Chordata
- Class: Mammalia
- Family: †Alphadontidae
- Genus: †Alphadon; Simpson, 1927

Species
- A. marshi (type) Simpson, 1927; A. wilsoni Lillegraven, 1969; A. halleyi Sahni, 1972; A. attaragos Lillegraven & McKenna, 1986; A. sahnii Lillegraven & McKenna, 1986; A. clemensi Eaton, 1993; A. lillegraveni Eaton, 1993; A. perexiguus Cifelli, 1994; A. eatoni Cifelli & Muizon, 1998

= Alphadon =

Alphadon Temporal range: Late Cretaceous, 100.5–66 Ma

Extinct genus of mammals

Alphadon is an extinct genus of small, primitive mammal that was a member of the metatherians, a group of mammals that includes modern-day marsupials. Its fossils were first discovered and named by George Gaylord Simpson in 1929.

== Description ==
Not much is known about the appearance of Alphadon, as it is only known from teeth, a lower jaw and skull fragments. It probably grew to about 12 in (30 cm) and may have resembled a modern opossum. Judging from its teeth, it was likely an omnivore, feeding on fruits, invertebrates and possibly small vertebrates. Alphadon had a very good sense of smell and sight to track down its food, both during the day and night. Its possible whiskers could have also aided in its search for food.

== Taxonomy and classification ==
The type species is Alphadon marshi. Eight other species are known. The species Alphadon jasoni was originally described by Storer (1991); it was subsequently transferred to the herpetotheriid genus Nortedelphys.

Recent phylogenetic studies group it with other northern non-marsupial metatherians such as Albertatherium and Turgidodon. A 2016 phylogenetic analysis is shown below.

- Marsupialiformes
  - - Gurlin Tsav skull
    - - Borhyaenidae
      - - Mayulestes
        - - Jaskhadelphys
          - - Andinodelphys
            - Pucadelphys
  - - Asiatherium
    - - - Iugomortiferum
        - Kokopellia
      - Aenigmadelphys
      - Anchistodelphys
      - - Glasbiidae
          Glasbius
        - Pediomyidae
          Pediomys
      - Stagodontidae
        - Pariadens
        - - Eodelphis
          - Didelphodon
      - Alphadontidae
        - Turgidodon
        - Alphadon
        - Albertatherium
      - Marsupialia
