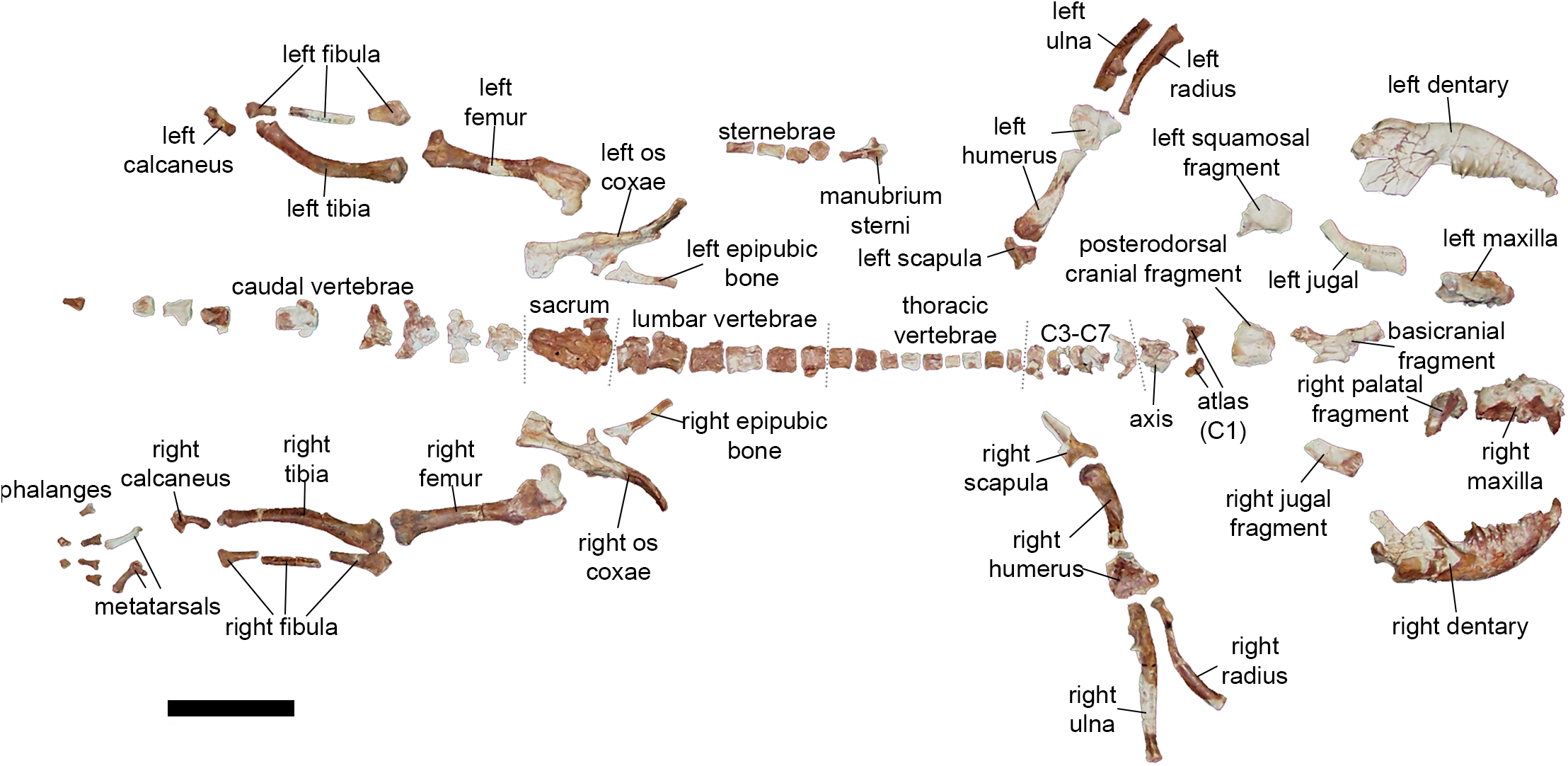
- Holotype skeleton, scale bar = 5 cm

Scientific classification
- Kingdom: Animalia
- Phylum: Chordata
- Class: Mammalia
- Family: †Anatoliadelphyidae
- Genus: †Anatoliadelphys; A. Murat Maga, Robin M. D. Beck, 2017
- Species: †A. maasae

Binomial name
- †Anatoliadelphys maasae A. Murat Maga, Robin M. D. Beck, 2017

= Anatoliadelphys =

Anatoliadelphys Temporal range: Middle Eocene

Extinct family of mammals

Anatoliadelphys maasae is an extinct genus of predatory metatherian mammal from the Eocene of Anatolia. It was an arboreal, cat-sized animal, with powerful crushing jaws similar to those of the modern Tasmanian devil. Although most mammalian predators of the northern hemisphere in this time period were placentals, Europe was an archipelago, and the island landmass now forming Turkey might have been devoid of competing mammalian predators, though this may not matter since other carnivorous metatherians are also known from the Cenozoic in the Northern Hemisphere. Nonetheless, it stands as a reminder that mammalian faunas in the Paleogene of the Northern Hemisphere were more complex than previously thought, and metatherians did not immediately lose their hold as major predators after their success in the Cretaceous.

== Taxonomy ==
The description of the new species and its genus, Anatoliadelphys, was published in 2017. The genus name combines terms derived from Greek, Anatolia for a region of Turkey and delphys, meaning uterus, a commonly suffix for marsupial taxa. The specific epithet honours the work of palaeontologist Mary Maas.

== Description ==
Holotype AÜJM 2002–25 was found in the Uzunçarşıdere Formation, Turkey. It is composed of a three-dimensionally preserved partial skull and near complete postcranial skeleton, one of the most well-preserved northern hemisphere metatherian specimens. The animal is approximately as large as a modern domestic cat at 2.76-3.97 kg; calculations were particularly difficult because its teeth are proportionally larger than those of modern carnivorous marsupials. The jaws are relatively short and robust and possess massive crushing, heavily worn premolars and molars and long, robust canines (no known incisors); while the skull is too incomplete to calculate the precise bite-force, it was most likely specialised for crushing and therefore it must have had a powerful bite.

The post-cranial skeleton seems to indicate an arboreal or semi-arboreal lifestyle, bearing grasping digits and a prehensile tail.

== Phylogenetics ==
A study incorporating several metatherian taxa showcases it as a non-marsupial but marsupialiform metatherian, most closely related to peradectids. In 2018 study found it to be a member of the newly named family Anatoliadelphyidae alongside Orhaniyeia which was found in the same formation, as close relatives of Polydolopimorphia.

== Biology ==
Anatoliadelphys is inferred to be a specialised carnivore based on its dentition, with premolars and molars similar to those of other bone-crushing mammals (though these also resemble those of durophagous mammals as well, suggesting at least opportunistic clam-feeding) and massive, stabbing canines. Like most modern dasyuromorphians and several extinct metatherians like sparassodonts, thylacoleonids and extinct kangaroos Ekaltadeta and Propleopus, it killed its prey with its jaws. It some aspects it resembles stagodontids, which also have crushing premolars and are inferred carnivores and molluscivores, though it lacks semi-aquatic adaptations and it has larger premolars and molars.

The authors of its paper claim that it was the largest carnivorous metatherian in the Cenozoic in the Northern Hemisphere, having likely evolved in isolation in the islands that are now Turkey, devoid of common placental carnivores of the time such as hyaenodonts and carnivorans. However, larger carnivorous metatherians are known from the Eocene and Miocene of Eurasia.
