= Goler Formation =

Geologic formation in California, U.S.

- Stratigraphic range: Paleogene
- Type: Formation
- Underlies: Ricardo Group (unconformity)
- Overlies: Garlock Formation (unconformity)

Lithology
- Primary: conglomerate, sandstone
- Other: siltstone, mudstone

Location
- Region: California
- Country: United States

The Goler Formation is a Paleogene geologic formation in California. It outcrops in the El Paso Mountains in the Mojave Desert near Ridgecrest. Fossils of mammals, reptiles, and cartilaginous fish are found in a few late Paleocene (Tiffanian age) sites from this formation, representing the best terrestrial Paleocene deposits in California.

== Geology ==
The Goler Formation is split into four members (subunits), labelled 1-4, with member 4 divided further into 4a-4d. The oldest members (1-2) lack fossils, and they probably represent alluvial fan environments eroding down into older canyons of granite and metamorphic rock. Fossils are found in members 3 and 4, which represent westward flowing braided rivers and streams in a warm monsoonal climate with strong wet and dry seasons. During the Paleocene, the Goler Formation was not far from the coast, but the predecessors of the Sierra Nevada further west created a rain shadow over the area. By the time of member 4d, the area was submerged by rising sea levels.

== Paleobiota ==
Nearly all fossils from the Goler Formation are concentrated into members 4a and 4b (the Goler Assemblage), with the exception of indeterminate turtles from member 3 and a Phenacodus tooth from member 4d. Members 4a and 4b are probably Tiffanian (Ti3-Ti5) in age, around the start of the late Paleocene. Member 4d could be any time between Tiffanian 5 and Bridgerian (early-mid Eocene) in age.

=== Mammals ===
The most abundant mammal fossils are Phenacodus cf. bisonensis and Nannodectes lynasi.

Mammals of the Goler Formation
Genus / Taxon	Species	Strata	Notes	Images
Arctocyonidae?	indet.	Member 4b	An indeterminate possible arctocyonid.	
Bessoecetor	B. septentrionalis	Member 4a	A pantolestid.	
Dissacus	D. sp.	Member 4a	A mesonychid.	
Golerdelphys	G. stocki	Member 4b	A herpetotheriid.	
Goleroconus	G. alfi	Member 4a, 4b	A periptychid.	
Ignacius	I. frugivorus	Member 4b	A paromomyid.	
Lambertocyon	L. cf. gingerichi	Member 4a	An arctocyonid.	
Mimotricentes	M. tedfordi	Member 4a	An arctocyonid.	
Nannodectes	N. lynasi	Member 4a, 4b	A plesiadapid.	
Paromomys	P. depressidens	Member 4a	A paromomyid.	
Peradectes	P. sp.	Member 4a, 4b	A peradectid.	
Phenacodus	P. cf. bisonensis	Member 4a, 4b	A phenacodontid.	
Phenacodus	P. cf. grangeri	Member 4a	A phenacodontid.	
Phenacodus	P. cf. matthewi	Member 4a	A phenacodontid.	
Phenacodus	P. cf. vortmani	Member 4d	A phenacodontid.	
Promioclaenus	P. walshi	Member 4a	A hyopsodontid.	
Protictis	P. cf. agastor	Member 4a	A viverravid.	
Protictis	P. paralus	Member 4a	A viverravid.	
Protoselene	P. ashtoni	Member 4a	A hyopsodontid.	
Stylinodontidae	indet.	Member 4a	An indeterminate stylinodontid.	
Thryptacodon	T. sp.	Member 4a	An oxyclaenid.	

== See also ==
- List of fossiliferous stratigraphic units in California
- Paleontology in California
