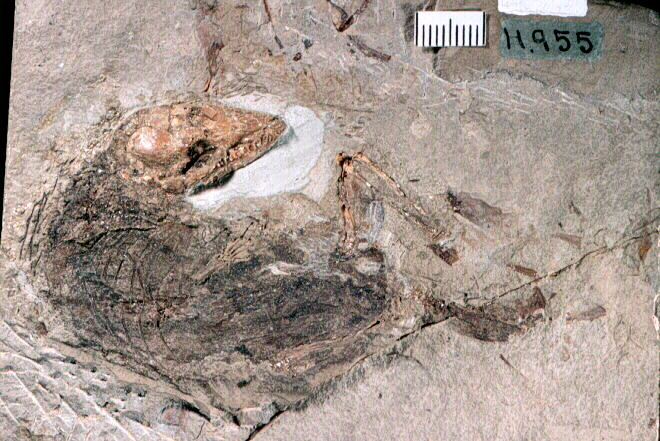
- Herpetotherium
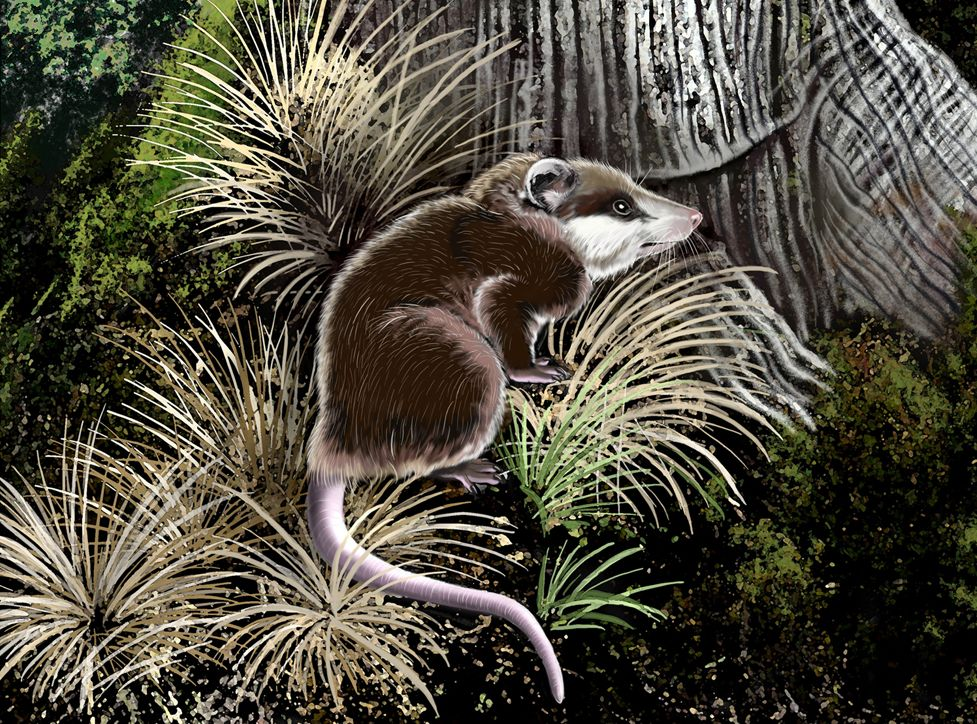
- Life restoration of Herpetotherium

Scientific classification
- Kingdom: Animalia
- Phylum: Chordata
- Class: Mammalia
- Clade: Marsupialiformes
- Family: †Herpetotheriidae; Trouessart, 1879

Genera
- See text.

Synonyms
- Herpetotheriinae

= Herpetotheriidae =

Herpetotheriidae Temporal range: Late Cretaceous - Miocene 66–20 Ma

Extinct family of mammals

Herpetotheriidae is an extinct family of metatherians, closely related to marsupials. Species of this family are generally reconstructed as terrestrial, and are considered morphologically similar to modern opossums. They are suggested to have been insectivores. Fossils of herpetotheriids come from North America, Asia, Europe, Africa, and perhaps South America. The oldest representative is Maastrichtidelphys from the latest Cretaceous (Maastrichtian) of the Netherlands and the youngest member is Amphiperatherium from the Middle Miocene of Europe. The group has been suggested to be paraphyletic, with an analysis of petrosal anatomy finding that North American Herpetotherium was more closely related to marsupials than the European Peratherium and Amphiperatherium.

The family includes the following genera:

- Amphiperatherium (Early Eocene to Middle Miocene, Europe; synonyms: Oxygomphius, Microtarsioides, Ceciliolemur)
- Asiadidelphis (Late Eocene to Early Oligocene, Kazakhstan and Pakistan)
- Copedelphys (Late Eocene to Early Oligocene, North America)
- Entomacodon (Middle Eocene, North America; synonym: Centracodon)
- Golerdelphys (Late Paleocene, North America)
- Galatiadelphys (Middle Eocene, Turkey)
- Herpetotherium (Early Eocene to Middle Miocene, North America)
- Maastrichtidelphys (Maastrichtian, Europe)
- Nortedelphys (Lancian, North America)
- Peratherium (Early Eocene to Early Miocene, Europe; Early Oligocene, Egypt, Oman; synonyms: Alacodon, Qatranitherium)
- Swaindelphys (Early Paleocene, North America)
- Morotodon (Early to Middle Miocene, Uganda, placement in the family tentative)

The following genera have been placed in the family, but their placement is disputed or obsolete:

- Garatherium (Early Eocene of Algeria) – possibly an adapisoriculid eutherian
- Indodelphis (Early Eocene of India) – originally referred to Peradectidae
- Jaegeria (Early Eocene of India) – a bat
- Rumiodon (Paleogene of Peru) – placement uncertain

Cladogram after Ladevèze et al 2020:, showing a paraphyletic Herpetotheriidae.

- Metatheria
  - †Deltatheriidae
  - - †Kokopellia
    - - †Asiatherium
      - - †Peradectidae
        - - †Stagodontidae
          - - - †Pucadelphyidae
              - †Sparassodonta
            - - - †Amphiperatherium
                - †Peratherium
              - - †Herpetotherium
                - Marsupialia

Cladogram after Gernelle et al. 2026:

- Metatheria
  - †Deltatheridiidae
  - Marsupaliformes
    - †Kokopellia
    - - †Aenigmadelphys
      - - †Alphadontidae
        - - - †Stagodontidae (Didelphodon)
            - - †Pediomyididae (Pediomys)
              - †Glasbiidae (Glasbius)
          - Notometatheria
            - - †Polydolopimorphia
              - - †Sparassodonta
                - †Pucadelphyoidea (Pucadelphys+Incadelphys)
            - - †Thylacodon
              - - - †Swaindelphys
                  - - †Peratherium
                    - - †Anatoliadelphyidae
                      - - †"Herpetotherium" edwardi
                        - †Herpetotherium fugax
                        - - †Derorhynchus
                          - Marsupialia
                - †Peradectidae
