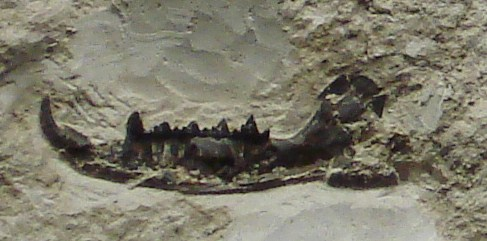
- Mandible of Amphiperatherium

Scientific classification
- Kingdom: Animalia
- Phylum: Chordata
- Class: Mammalia
- Family: †Herpetotheriidae
- Genus: †Amphiperatherium; Filhol, 1879

Type species
- †Amphiperatherium frequens von Meyer, 1846

Species
- A. ambiguum Filhol, 1877; A. bastbergense Crochet, 1979; A. bourdellense Crochet, 1979; A. brabantense Crochet, 1979; A. exile Gervais, 1848; A. fontense Crochet, 1979; A. frequens von Meyer, 1846; A. giselense Heller, 1936; A. goethei Crochet, 1979; A. lamandini Filhol, 1876; A. maximum Crochet, 1979; A. minutum Aymard, 1846

Synonyms
- Oxygomphius Meyer, 1846

= Amphiperatherium =

Amphiperatherium Temporal range: Early Eocene-Late Miocene 50–15 Ma

Extinct family of mammals

Amphiperatherium is an extinct genus of metatherian mammal, closely related to marsupials. It ranged from the Early Eocene to the Middle Miocene in Europe. It is the most recent metatherian known from the continent.

== Description ==
Like modern opossums, to which it was distantly related, this animal had a 15 centimeters long body and a 17 centimeters long tail. Its body size was relatively larger than some of its earlier relatives, such as Peradectes, but its tail was proportionally shorter.

Amphiperatherium minutum is known to have possessed transverse crista in the stylar shelf of its maxillary molars, a feature seen in many other metatherians.

== Classification ==
Amphiperatherium is part of an evolutionary radiation of opossum-like metatherians, known as Herpetotheriidae, typical of the Early Cenozoic of Europe, Asia and North America, currently considered either the most primitive of all marsupials, or the sister taxon of Marsupialia. Amphiperatherium was not only the more recent herpetotheriid known, but also the last marsupial known in Europe, becoming extinct during the Middle Miocene, 15 millions of years ago. Its extinction coincided with a general cooling of the European climate, which seems to have been the fatal blow for the herpetotheriids, adapted to milder climates.

The genus was first described by Filhol in 1879, based on material found in France, but additional fossils were later found in Spain, Germany, Belgium, Czech Republic and England, the genus surviving for 35 millions of years, from the Early Eocene to the Late Miocene. Amphiperatherium must have been an evolutionary success, allowing the genus to survive for millions of years without undergoing important changes. Among the best known species are Amphiperatherium bourdellense, A. exile, A. fontense, A. minutum and A. frequens, the last surviving species from the Middle Miocene. It was related to the European genus Peratherium and the American genus Herpetotherium.

== Palaeoecology ==
The morphological characteristics of Amphiperatherium indicates that, unlike similar but smaller genera such as Peradectes, spent most of its time on the ground. Some features of its skeletons, however, such as its prehensile tail, indicates that it was at least a partially arboreal animal, consuming a large variety of foods, including small animals and plants.

== Bibliography ==
- J. J. Hooker. 1996. Mammals from the Early (late Ypresian) to Middle (Lutetian) Eocene Bracklesham Group, southern England. Tertiary Research 16(1-4):141-174
- Furió, M., Ruiz-Sánchez, F.J., Crespo, V.D., Freudenthal, M. & Montoya, P. (published online 2012). The southernmost Miocene occurrence of the last European herpetotheriid Amphiperatherium frequens (Metatheria, Mammalia). Comptes Rendus Palevol.
