= Fumodelphodon =

Fumodelphodon Temporal range: Turonian

Scientific classification
- Kingdom: Animalia
- Phylum: Chordata
- Class: Mammalia
- Family: †Stagodontidae
- Genus: †Fumodelphodon
- Species: †F. pulveris

Binomial name
- †Fumodelphodon pulveris Cohen, 2017

Extinct monotypic genus of stagodontid mammal

Fumodelphodon is an extinct monotypic genus of stagodontid mammal that lived in North America during the Turonian stage of the Late Cretaceous epoch.

== Etymology ==
The generic name Fumodelphodon is composed of the roots Fumo-, meaning smoke in Latin in reference to the Smoky Hollow Member of the Straight Cliffs Formation in which the holotype was discovered, and -delphodon, in reference to its hypothesised phylogenetic closeness to Didelphodon. The specific epithet of the type species, Fumodelphodon pulveris, references the pulverising capability of the premolar dentition of the species, which is believed to have been durophagous.
