= Indodelphis =

Indodelphis Temporal range: Eocene, 56.0–47.8 Ma

Scientific classification
- Kingdom: Animalia
- Phylum: Chordata
- Class: Mammalia
- Family: †Herpetotheriidae
- Genus: †Indodelphis; Bajpai, Kapur, Thewissen, Tiwari & Das, 2005
- Species: †I. luoi

Binomial name
- †Indodelphis luoi Bajpai, Kapur, Thewissen, Tiwari & Das, 2005

Genus of mammals

Indodelphis is an extinct genus of opossum-like metatherian from the Eocene of the Cambay Shale Formation of India. The type and the only species is Indodelphis luoi.

Indodelphis is the only known metatherian from Insular India (another, Jaegeria, has had its metatherian status questioned). It is known from the well-preserved lower molars of two individuals. This species probably represents the oldest-known record of Cenozoic metatherians from Asia, and it occurs in association with a diverse land mammal fauna comprising perissodactyls, artiodactyls, insectivores, laurasiatherians, apatotherians, bats, rodents and several other taxa currently under study.

It was initially assigned to the Peradectidae, but more likely belongs to the Herpetotheriidae. It may possibly be a junior synonym of Asiadidelphis from the Paleogene of Pakistan and Kazakhstan, which is known only from upper molars. It is unknown whether Indodelphis descended from a metatherian that colonized Insular India from Asia, or if it was a relict of India's original Gondwanan mammalian fauna.
