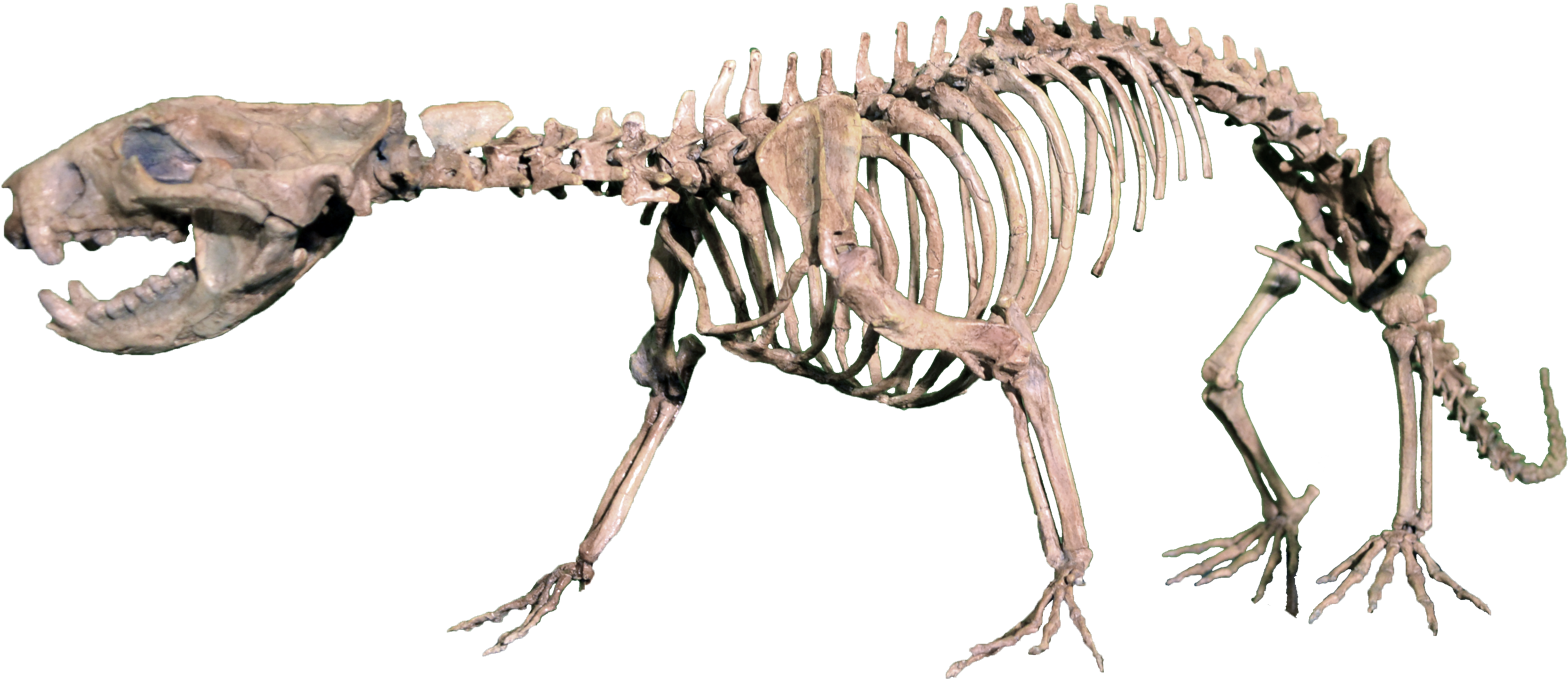
- Cast of Didelphodon skeleton in the Rocky Mountain Dinosaur Resource Center

Scientific classification
- Kingdom: Animalia
- Phylum: Chordata
- Class: Mammalia
- Family: †Stagodontidae
- Genus: †Didelphodon; Marsh, 1889

Type species
- †Didelphodon vorax Marsh, 1889

Species
- Didelphodon vorax Marsh, 1889 (type); Didelphodon padanicus Cope, 1892; Didelphodon coyi Fox & Naylor, 1986

= Didelphodon =

Didelphodon Temporal range: Late Cretaceous, 73–66 Ma

Genus of extinct metatherian

Didelphodon (from Didelph[is] "opossum" and ὀδών odōn "tooth") is a genus of extinct metatherian mammal from the Late Cretaceous of North America.

== Description ==
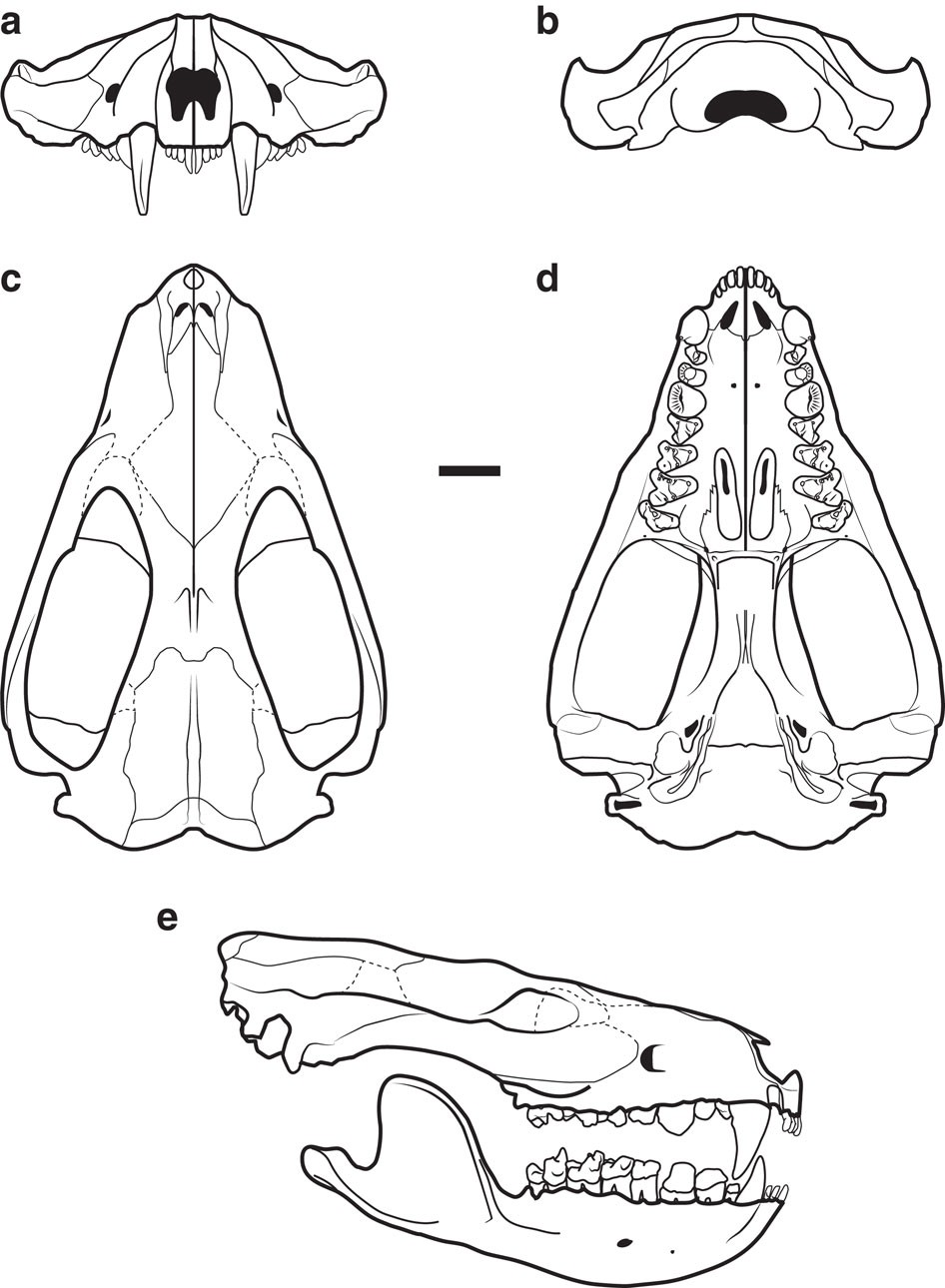
Restoration of the skull of Didelphodon vorax

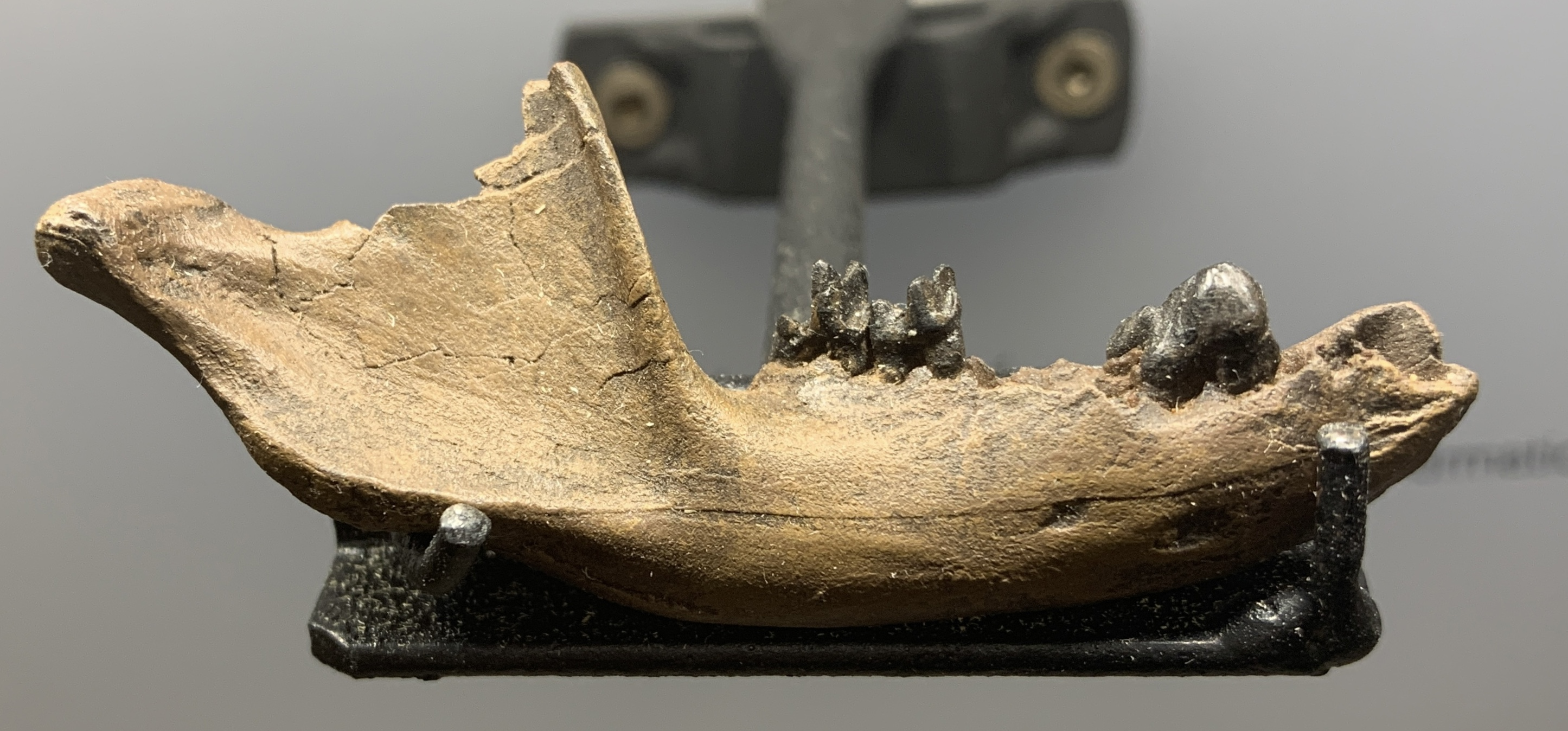
Cast of the D. coyi holotype (TMP 2005.000.0004), at the Royal Tyrrell Museum of Palaeontology. Late Cretaceous, Horseshoe Canyon Formation, Michichi Creek, Alberta

Although perhaps little larger than a Virginia opossum, with a skull length of 12.2 centimetres (4.8 in) and a weight of 5.2 kilograms (11 lb), the teeth have specialized bladelike cusps and carnassial notches, indicating that the animal was a predator; the jaws are short and massive and bear enormous, bulbous premolar teeth which appear to have been used for crushing. Analyses of a near-complete skull referred to Didelphodon show that it had an unusually high bite force quotient (i.e. bite force relative to body size) among Mesozoic mammals, suggesting a durophagous diet. However, its skull lacks the vaulted forehead of hyenas and other specialized bone-eating durophagous mammals, indicating that its diet was perhaps a mixture of hard foodstuffs (e.g. snails, bones) alongside small vertebrates and carrion; although omnivorous habits were suggested in the past, it appears that it was incapable of processing plant matter, rendering it more likely to be hypercarnivorous or durophagous. Some convergence with the carnassials of other predatory mammal groups has also been noted.

== Discovery ==
Three species of Didelphodon are known: D. vorax, D. padanicus, and D. coyi. The genus is known from the Hell Creek Formation of Montana and the Lance Formation of Wyoming, the Frenchman Formation of Saskatchewan, the Horseshoe Canyon Formation of Alberta, and the Scollard Formation of Alberta, where it is one of the most abundant mammals. It is found solely in late Maastrichtian deposits.

== Classification ==
Didelphodon is a stagodontid marsupial related to Eodelphis and Pariadens. The genus appears to descend from the Campanian Eodelphis, and in particular appears to be related to Eodelphis cutleri. Pariadens appears to be more primitive than either Eodelphis or Didelphodon, and is probably sister to their group. Didelphimorphia is an order that was named in 1872 by Gill. Previously, in 1821, Gray named the superfamily Didelphoidea to house the families Alphadontidae, Pediomyidae, Peradectidae, and Stagodontidae, which unites Didelphodon with many other genera.

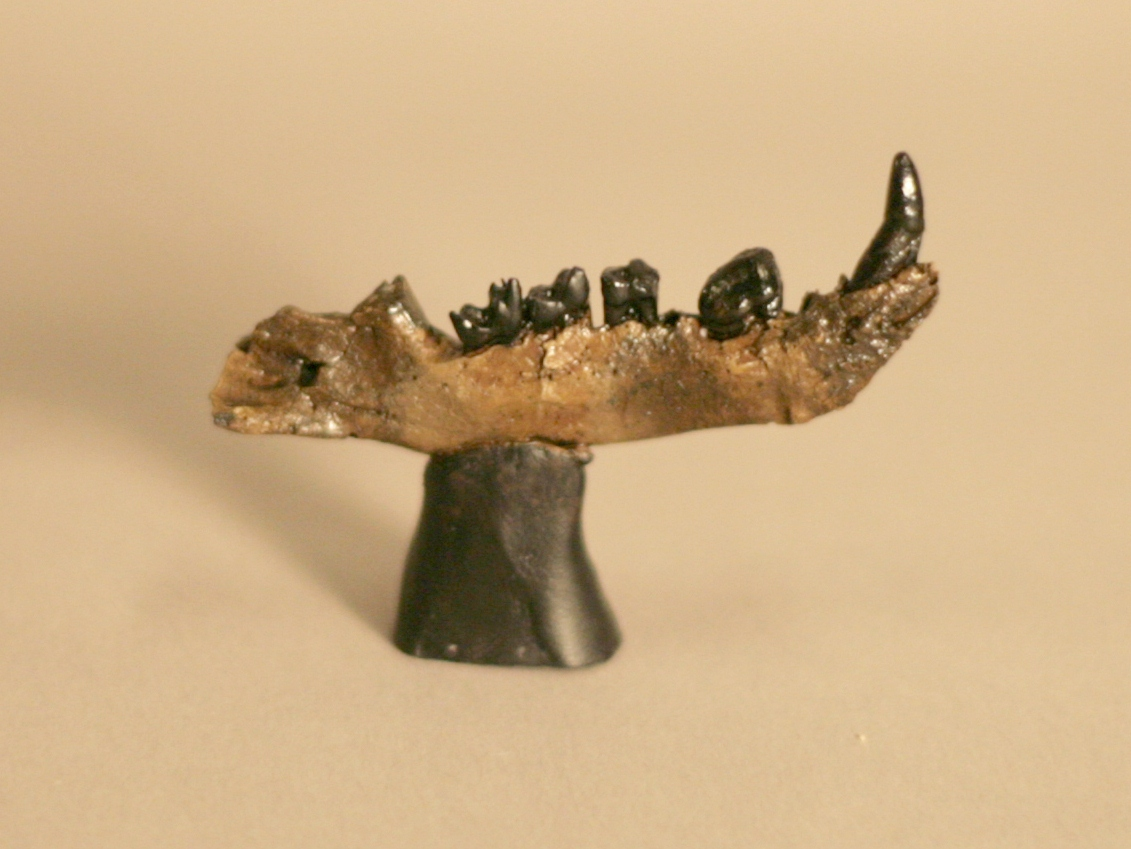
Cast of the first Didelphodon mandible (the holotype of the genus), assigned to D. vorax, to be discovered still containing teeth, now located in the permanent collection of The Children's Museum of Indianapolis

In 2006, a study found that the stagodontids only contained two taxa, Didelphodon and Eodelphis. The previously-included Pariadens was excluded from the group because its type species, P. kirklandi, lacks any of the clade's characteristics; it was reassigned to Marsupialia incertae sedis. Another species, "P." mckennai lacks marsupial features, and is probably a therian. Another historical stagodontid, Boreodon, is a nomen dubium. Finally, the purported stagodontid Delphodon is probably a synonym of Pediomys or Alphadon.

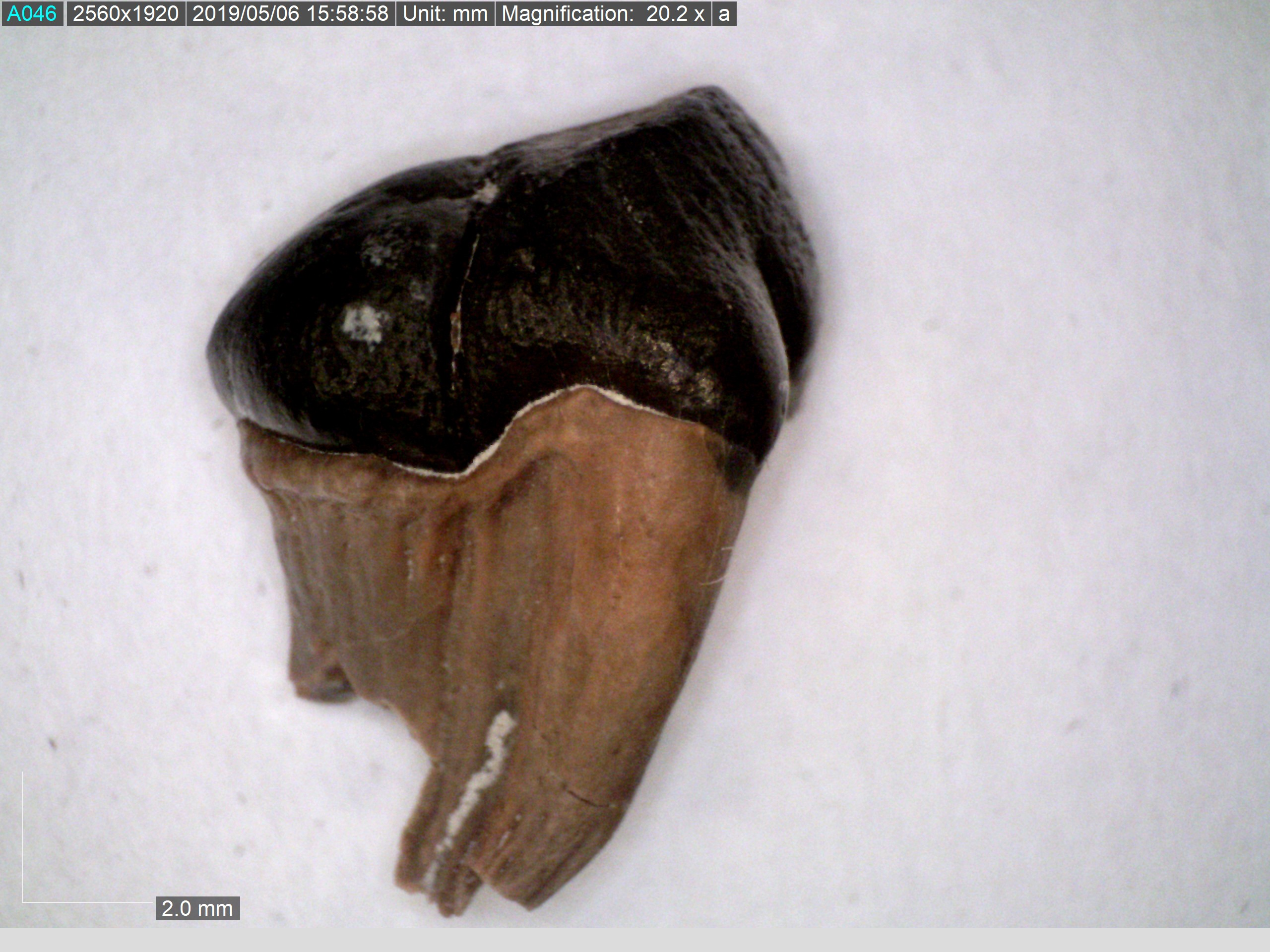
Premolar or molar of Didelphodon. Like most mammals, and unlike their contemporaries, the dinosaurs, Didelphodon had very advanced dentition.

A 2016 phylogenetic analysis found that Didelphodon and other stagodontids were marsupialiforms. Their relationships within the Marsupialiformes are shown below.

- Marsupialiformes
  - - Gurlin Tsav skull
    - - Borhyaenidae
      - - Mayulestes
        - - Jaskhadelphys
          - - Andinodelphys
            - Pucadelphys
  - - Asiatherium
    - - - Iugomortiferum
        - Kokopellia
      - Aenigmadelphys
      - Anchistodelphys
      - - Glasbiidae
          Glasbius
        - Pediomyidae
          Pediomys
      - Stagodontidae
        - Pariadens
        - - Eodelphis
          - Didelphodon
      - Alphadontidae
        - Turgidodon
        - Alphadon
        - Albertatherium
      - Marsupialia

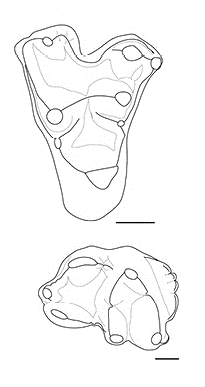
Molars

== Paleobiology ==
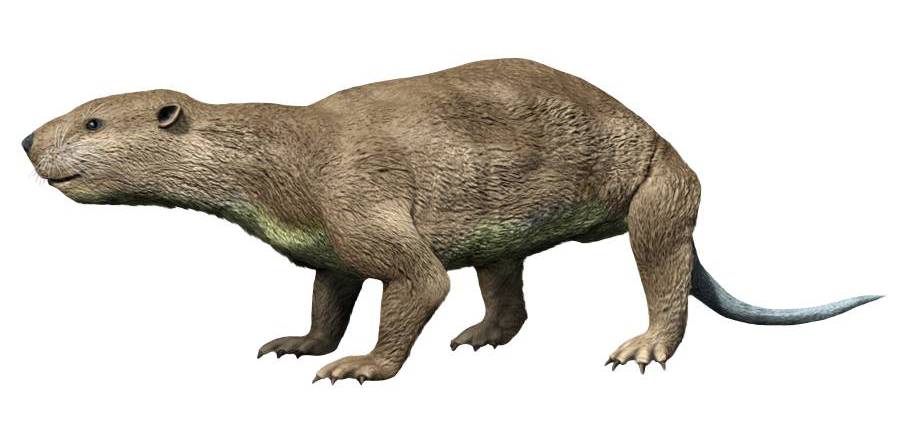
Life restoration of Didelphodon vorax

Although it has been argued on the basis of the shape of referred tarsal bones that Didelphodon and other stagodontids were semiaquatic due to having flexible feet, these traits may in fact be evidence of increased rigidity in the foot. Comparisons of oxygen-18 and carbon-13 isotopes derived from enamel indicate a semi-aquatic ecology for Didelphodon. A study on Mesozoic mammal locomotion also demonstrates that Didelphodon groups with semi-aquatic species.

The evolution of Didelphodon and other large stagodontids (as well as large deltatheroidans like Nanocuris) occurs after the local extinction of eutriconodont mammals, suggesting passive or direct ecological replacement. Given that all insectivorous and carnivorous mammal groups suffered heavy losses during the mid-Cretaceous, it seems likely these metatherians simply occupied niches left after the extinction of most eutriconodonts.

== See also ==
- Largest prehistoric animals
