= Argyrolagus =

Argyrolagus Temporal range: Early Pliocene (Montehermosan-Chapadmalalan) ~5.3–3.6 Ma
- Argyrolagus palmeri

Scientific classification
- Kingdom: Animalia
- Phylum: Chordata
- Class: Mammalia
- Order: †Polydolopimorphia
- Suborder: †Bonapartheriiformes
- Family: †Argyrolagidae
- Genus: †Argyrolagus; Ameghino 1904

Type species
- †Argyrolagus palmeri

Extinct genus of marsupials

Argyrolagus is an extinct genus of South American metatherian belonging to the order Polydolopimorpha. It lived during the Early Pliocene, and its fossils have been recovered from the Monte Hermoso Formation in Patagonia, Argentina.

Measuring approximately 15–20 cm (5.9–7.9 in) in body length, excluding the tail, Argyrolagus resembled the modern greater bilby, an example of convergent evolution between distantly related marsupials. It had elongated hind limbs adapted for bipedal hopping, a long tail that aided balance and a narrow head with a pointed snout. Its proportionately large eyes suggest that it may have been nocturnal, while its dental morphology indicates a diet of desert vegetation. A 2019 study further proposed that Argyrolagus was adapted for both bipedal hopping and digging.

== See also ==
- Chulpasia
