= Antarctodolops =

Antarctodolops Temporal range: 48.6–37.2 Ma

Scientific classification
- Domain: Eukaryota
- Kingdom: Animalia
- Phylum: Chordata
- Class: Mammalia
- Order: †Polydolopimorphia
- Family: †Polydolopidae
- Genus: †Antarctodolops; Woodburne and Zinsmeister, 1984

Type species
- Antarctodolops dailyi Woodburne and Zinsmeister, 1984

Species
- Antarctodolops dailyi; Antarctodolops mesetaense

Extinct genus of marsupial

Antarctodolops is an extinct genus of polydolopimorphian metatherian similar to, but not closely related to, the living shrew opossums. It lived on Seymour Island, Antarctica in the Eocene. Two species, Antarctodolops dailyi and Antarctodolops mesetaense, have been found. These species were different sizes, with A. mesetaense being the larger.
