= Galatiadelphys =

Galatiadelphys Temporal range: Middle Eocene

Scientific classification
- Kingdom: Animalia
- Phylum: Chordata
- Class: Mammalia
- Family: †Herpetotheriidae
- Genus: †Galatiadelphys
- Species: †G. minor

Binomial name
- †Galatiadelphys minor Métais et al., 2018

Galatiadelphys is an extinct genus of herpetotheriid that inhabited Turkey during the Eocene epoch. It contains a single species, G. minor.
