= Bonapartherium =

Bonapartherium Temporal range: 37.2–33.9 Ma

Scientific classification
- Kingdom: Animalia
- Phylum: Chordata
- Class: Mammalia
- Order: †Polydolopimorphia
- Family: †Bonapartheriidae
- Genus: †Bonapartherium

Species
- †B. hinakusijum Pascual, 1980; †B. serrensis Goin et al. 1998

Extinct genus of South American metatherian

Bonapartherium is an extinct genus of polydolopimorphian metatherian known from the Late Eocene to the Earliest Oligocene in what is now Argentina.

Two species are recognized, B. hinakusijum and B. serrensis.
