= Hoodootherium =

Hoodootherium Temporal range: Turonian

Scientific classification
- Kingdom: Animalia
- Phylum: Chordata
- Class: Mammalia
- Family: †Stagodontidae
- Genus: †Hoodootherium
- Species: †H. praeceps

Binomial name
- †Hoodootherium praeceps Cohen, 2017

Extinct monotypic genus of stagodontid mammal

Hoodootherium is an extinct monotypic genus of stagodontid mammal that lived in North America during the Turonian stage of the Late Cretaceous epoch.

== Etymology ==
The generic name Hoodootherium is made up of the roots Hoodoo-, in reference to the hoodoos that are ubiquitous geological features in southern Utah, and -therium, a very common suffix in generic names of fossil mammals. The specific epithet of the type species, Hoodootherium praeceps, means cliff in Latin, which is in reference to the Straight Cliffs Formation, the geologic formation in which the holotype of the species was found.
