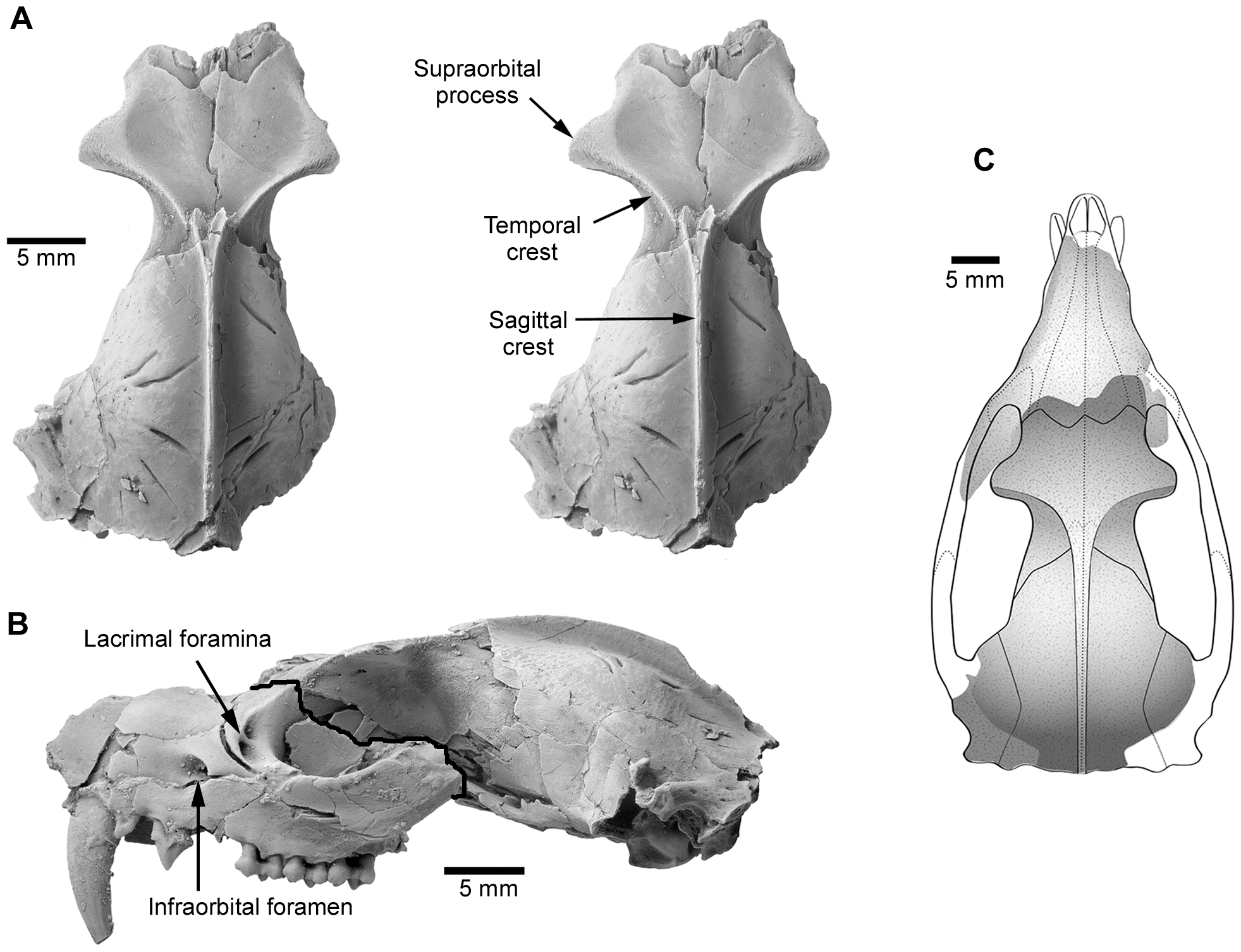
- Skull

Scientific classification
- Kingdom: Animalia
- Phylum: Chordata
- Class: Mammalia
- Family: †Peradectidae
- Genus: †Mimoperadectes; Bown & Rose, 1979

Species
- Mimoperadectes hudei Horovitz et al., 2009; Mimoperadectes labrus Bown & Rose, 1979 (type species)

= Mimoperadectes =

Extinct genus of marsupials

Mimoperadectes is an extinct genus of metatherian mammal from the Eocene of North America.

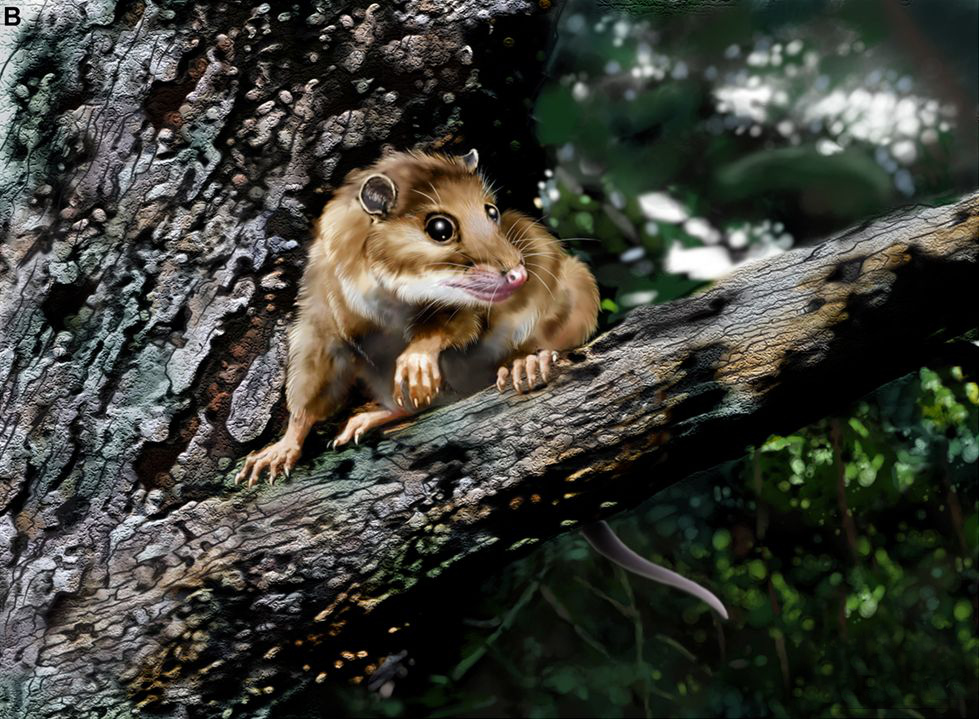
Restoration
