= Orhaniyeia =

Orhaniyeia Temporal range: Middle Eocene

Scientific classification
- Kingdom: Animalia
- Phylum: Chordata
- Class: Mammalia
- Family: †Anatoliadelphyidae
- Genus: †Orhaniyeia; Métais et al., 2018
- Species: †O. nauta

Binomial name
- †Orhaniyeia nauta Métais et al., 2018

Extinct genus of mammals

Orhaniyeia is an extinct genus of anatoliadelphyid that inhabited Turkey during the Eocene epoch. It contains the species Orhaniyeia nauta.

== Distribution ==
Orhaniyeia nauta is known from the Pontide terrane of what was then the continent of Balkanatolia, living during the Lutetian about 43 Ma.

== Palaeoecology ==
Based on its dentition, O. nauta was durophagous and probably fed on gastropods.
