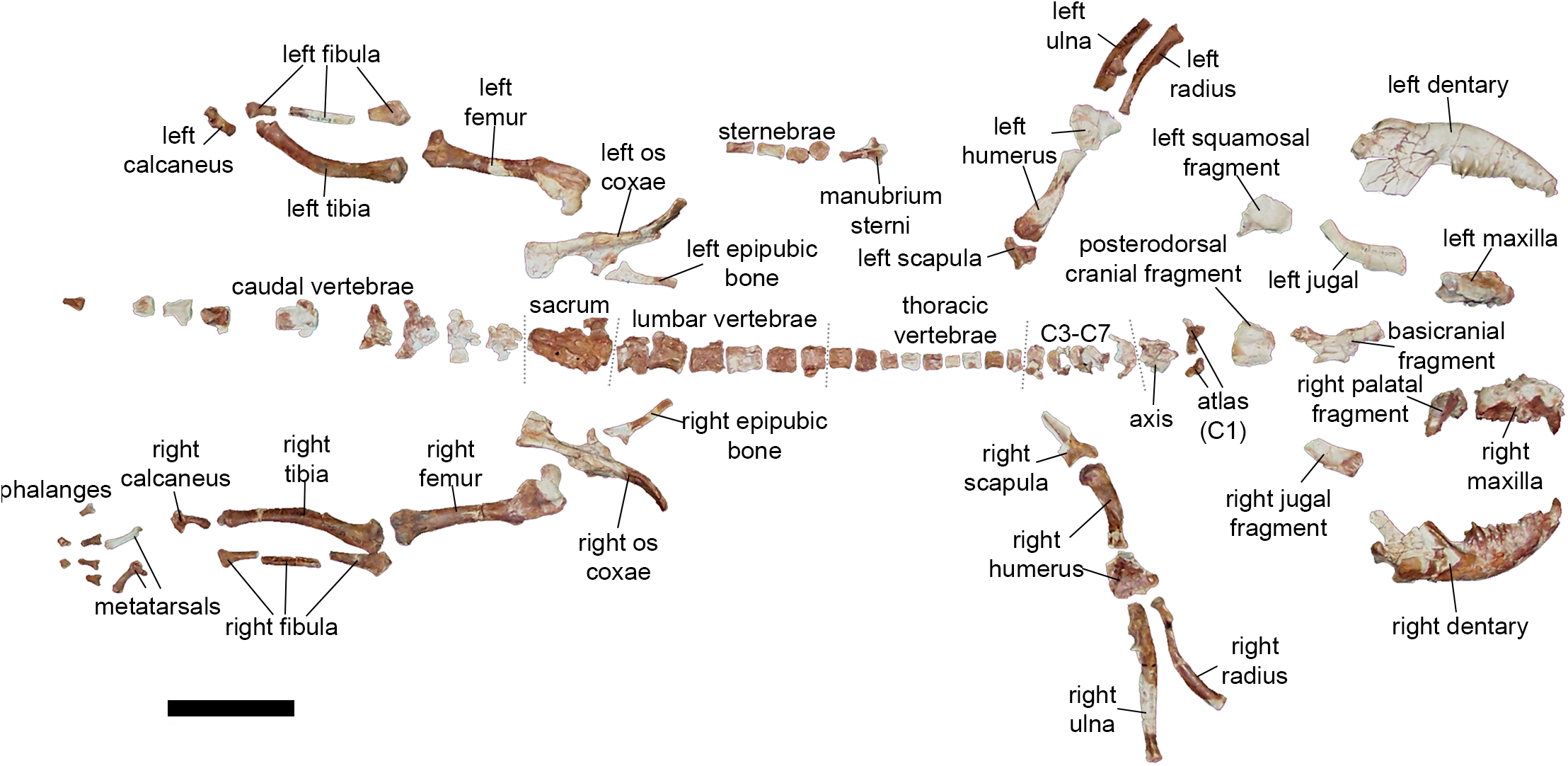
- Holotype skeleton of Anatoliadelphys, scale bar = 5 cm

Scientific classification
- Kingdom: Animalia
- Phylum: Chordata
- Class: Mammalia
- Clade: Marsupialiformes
- Family: †Anatoliadelphyidae; Métais et al. 2018

Genera
- Anatoliadelphys; Orhaniyeia

= Anatoliadelphyidae =

Anatoliadelphyidae Temporal range: Eocene Lutetian

Extinct family of mammals

Anatoliadelphyidae is an extinct family of metatherian mammals, endemic to the Pontide terrane (forming part of what is now modern Anatolia), during the Middle Eocene (Lutetian), around 43 million years ago, when the terrane formed an island landmass with an insular endemic fauna, which also included herpetotheriid and polydolopimorphian metatherians, as well as archaic pleuraspidotheriid ungulates and enigmatic insectivores. The cat-sized Anatoliadelphys is the best known member, and is thought to have been a carnivore or omnivore.
