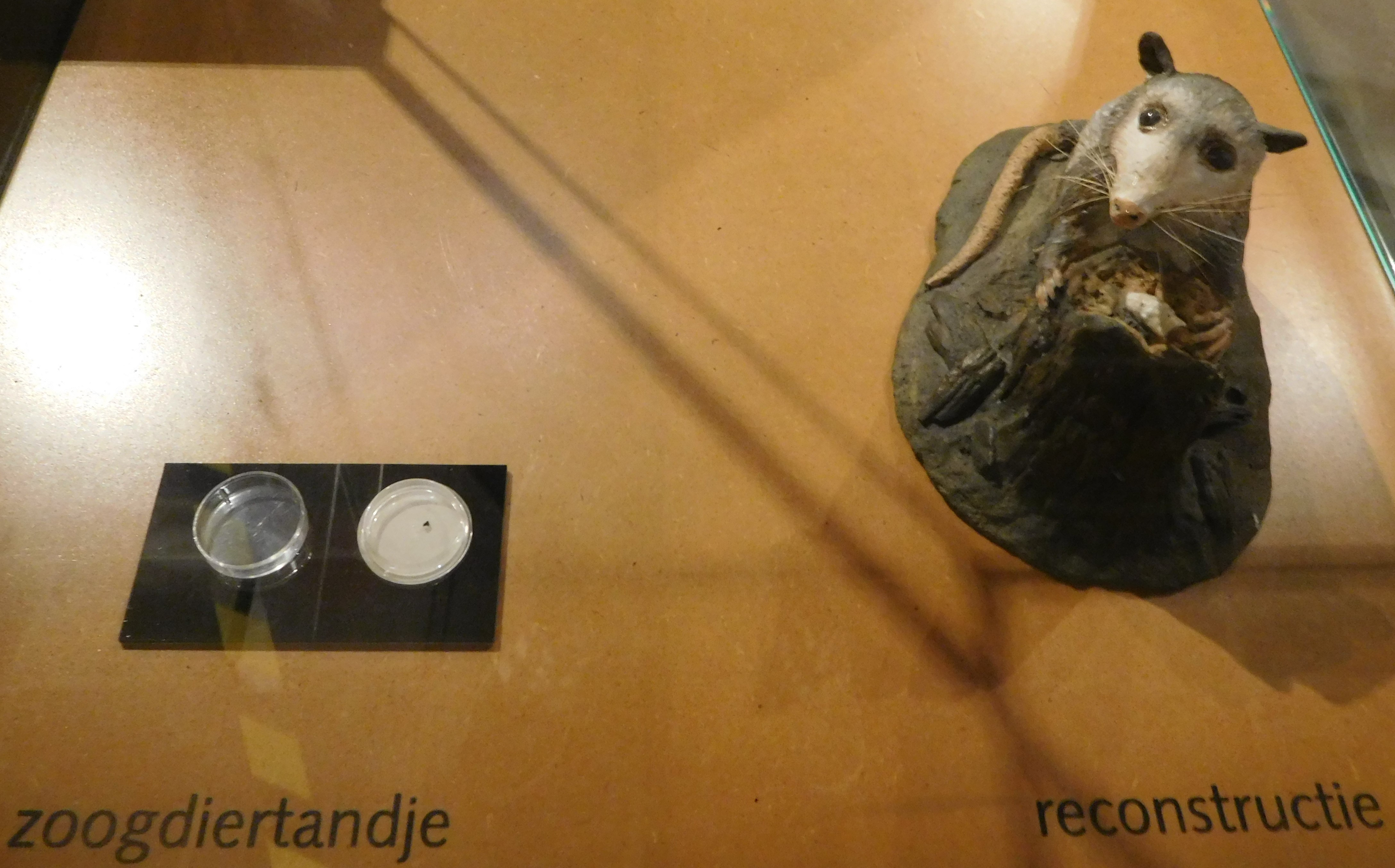
- Tooth and reconstruction of Maastrichtidelphys in the Natuurhistorisch Museum Maastricht

Scientific classification
- Domain: Eukaryota
- Kingdom: Animalia
- Phylum: Chordata
- Class: Mammalia
- Family: †Herpetotheriidae
- Genus: †Maastrichtidelphys (Martin et al., 2005)
- Species: †M. meurismeti

Binomial name
- †Maastrichtidelphys meurismeti (Martin et al., 2005)

= Maastrichtidelphys =

Maastrichtidelphys Temporal range: Maastrichtian

Extinct genus of mammals

Maastrichtidelphys is a Late Cretaceous genus of metatherian (marsupial lineage) mammal from the Netherlands in Europe. The genus contains a single species, M. meurismeti. It is known from an extremely small right upper molar, and analysis of it suggests that Maastrichtidelphys is most closely related to the North American herpetotheriid marsupial, Nortedelphys, which is Lancian in age.

Maastrichtidelphys belongs to a group of mammals with their origins in North America, the Herpetotheriidae. The presence of Maastrichtidelphys in Europe in the Late Cretaceous shows there was a high-latitude North Atlantic dispersal route between North America and Europe for marsupials, which suggests they spread across Europe at least 10 million years earlier than previously thought.
