= Golerdelphys =

Golerdelphys Temporal range: Thanetian

Scientific classification
- Domain: Eukaryota
- Kingdom: Animalia
- Phylum: Chordata
- Class: Mammalia
- Family: †Herpetotheriidae
- Genus: †Golerdelphys
- Species: †G. stocki

Binomial name
- †Golerdelphys stocki Williamson & Lofgren, 2014

Golerdelphys is an extinct genus of herpetotheriid that lived during the Thanetian stage of the Palaeocene epoch.

== Distribution ==
Golerdelphys stocki is known from fossils found in the Goler Formation of California.
