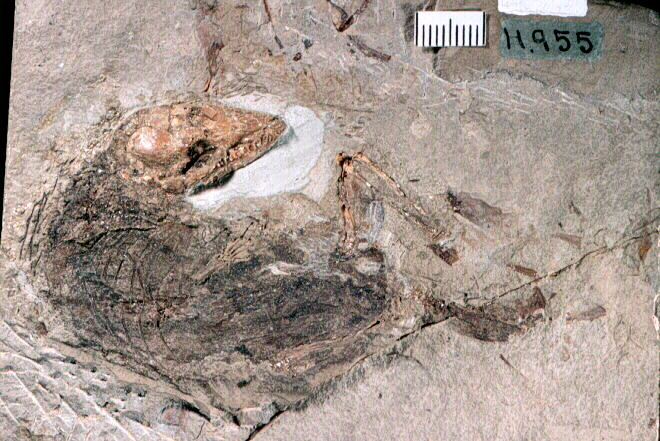
- H. huntii

Scientific classification
- Kingdom: Animalia
- Phylum: Chordata
- Class: Mammalia
- Family: †Herpetotheriidae
- Genus: †Herpetotherium; Cope, 1873

Type species
- †Herpetotherium fugax

Other species
- †H. huntii; †H. knighti; †H. merriami; †H. tabrumi; †H. valens; †H. youngi

= Herpetotherium =

Herpetotherium Temporal range: Early Eocene – Early Miocene

Extinct genus of metatherian mammals

Herpetotherium is an extinct genus of metatherian mammal, belonging to the possibly paraphyletic family Herpetotheriidae. Native to North America from the Eocene to Early Miocene, fossils have been found in California, Oregon, Texas, Florida, Montana, Wyoming, Colorado, North and South Dakota, Nebraska, and Saskatchewan. The oldest species, H. knighti, is dated to around 50.3 mya, and the most recent, an unnamed species, may be as recent as 15.97 mya. A morphological analysis of marsupials and basal metatherians conducted in 2007 found Herpetotherium to be the sister group to extant marsupials. It is the youngest known metatherian from North America until the migration of the Virginia opossum from South America within the last 2 million years.

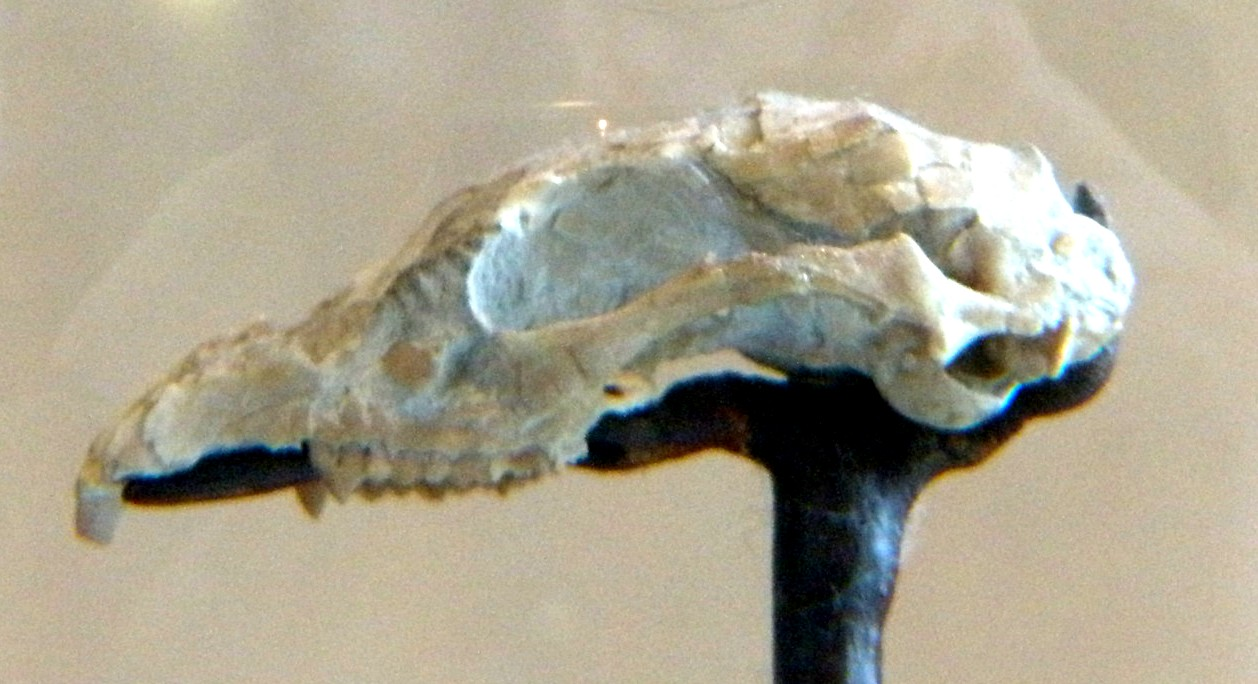
Herpetotherium fugax

Some authors have regarded the species assigned to Herpetotherium (for instance, H. comstocki, H. marsupium, and H. merriami) as belonging to African and European genus Peratherium Aymard, 1850 on the basis of Simpson's observation that "the upper molars ... agree closely with Peratherium, less closely with other didelphid genera" and on Cope himself recognizing "there is no valid distinction between Herpetotherium and Peratherium" (Simpson, 1928, p. 6) Yet other authors have continued to maintain generic separation for Herpetotherium and continue to assign new North American species of herpetotheriid marsupials to this genus.

== Species ==
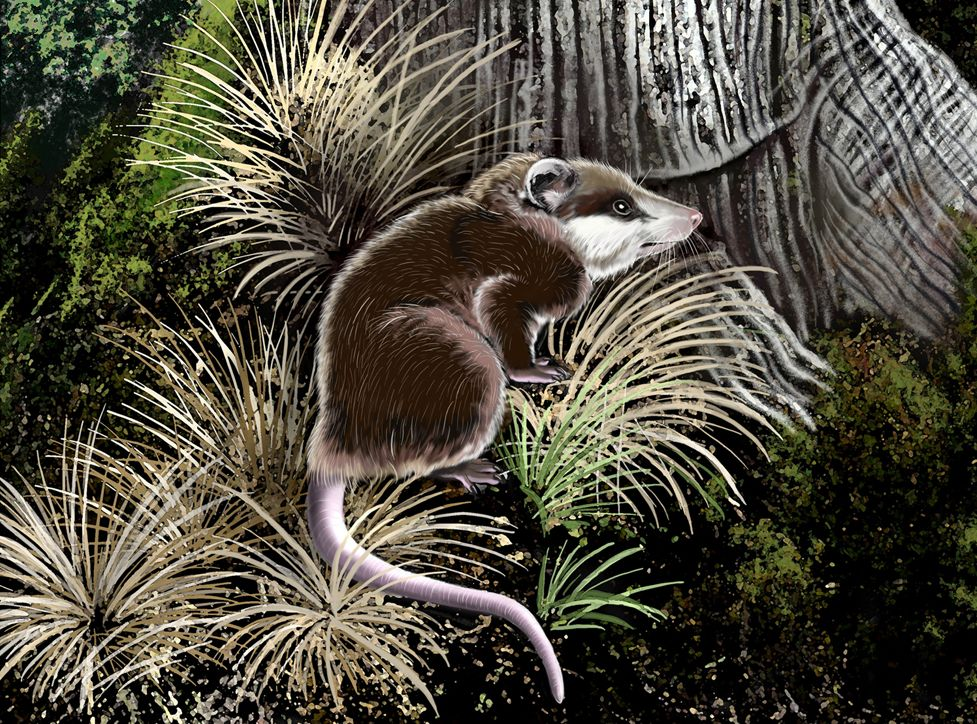
- Restoration
  H. fugax (syn. Didelphys pygmaea, H. scalare, H. tricuspis, Peratherium fugax) (type)
- H. huntii
- H. knighti (syn. Centracodon delicatus, Entomacodon minutus, Peratherium morrisi)
- H. marsupium Troxell, 1923, p. 508 (syn. Peratherium marsupium according to Simpson, 1928)
- H. merriami (Stock and Furlong, 1922, originally named within Peratherium as Stock agreed with Simpson that Herpetotherium Cope 1873 was synonymous with Peratherium)
- H. tabrumi Korth, 2018
- H. valens (syn. Peratherium donahoei)
- H. youngi (syn. Peratherium spindleri)

== Anatomy and morphology ==
Herpetotherium has long been recognized as having a primitive morphology compared to other marsupials. For instance, Osborn (1907, p. 111) thought it represented an ancestral stock to both "later carnivorous and herbivorous types of marsupials", and thought it was evidence that polyprotodont opossum-like mammals must have given rise to other marsupials (Osborn, 1910, p. 154). Troxell (1923) strongly fixated on mandibular characters of Herpetotherium (though speaking specifically of H. marsupium, yet these are generally true of Herpetotherium) that he felt were especially comparable to Didelphis, such as "(1) the strong canine, (2) weak anterior premolar, (3) dominance of the protocone in the premolars, (4) fourth tooth of the series molariform, (5) position of mental foramen under this tooth, (6) identical form of the molars, (7) groove on the jaw suggesting an inflected angle," yet he pointed out several differences, such as "(1) absence of diastemata around the anterior premolar, (2) trend of the mental foramen forward instead of backward, (3) the inflected angle, seeming to begin beneath the molars" (p. 510).
