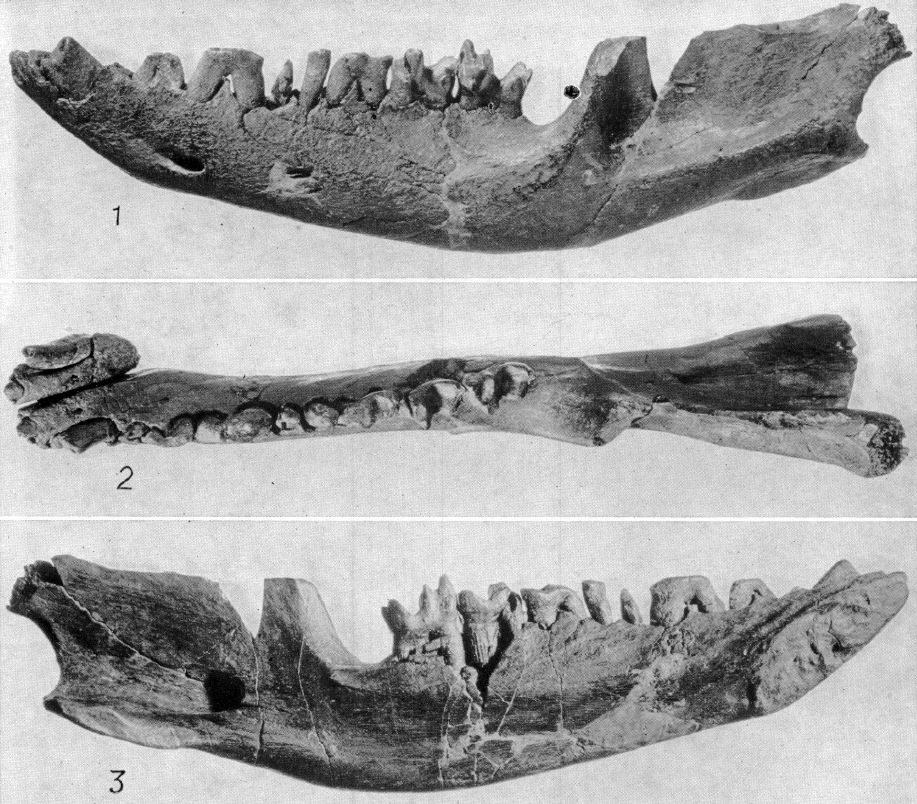
- Type specimen of Eodephis browni

Scientific classification
- Kingdom: Animalia
- Phylum: Chordata
- Class: Mammalia
- Family: †Stagodontidae
- Genus: †Eodelphis; Matthew, 1916

Species
- Eodephis browni Matthew, 1916; Eodelphis cutleri Woodward, 1916

= Eodelphis =

Eodelphis Temporal range: Late Cretaceous, 83.5 Ma

Extinct genus of marsupials

Eodelphis, from eo- (dawn) and [Di]delphis (a genus of Opossum), thus meaning "dawn opossum", is a genus of stagodontid metatherians from the Late Cretaceous of North America, with distinctive crushing dentition. Named species include E. browni and the more advanced E. cutleri. Both come from the Late Campanian (Judithian "Land Mammal Age") of Dinosaur Provincial Park, Alberta. Specimens are also known from the Judith River Formation of Montana. E. cutleri is related to the Maastrichtian genus Didelphodon as indicated by its enlarged premolars and more robust jaw. Eodelphis was probably an aquatic predator like its relative Didelphodon, and may have weighed about 0.6 kg (1.3 lb), making it one of the largest mammals of its time.
