= Turgidodon =

Turgidodon Temporal range: Late Cretaceous, Campanian–Maastrichtian

Scientific classification
- Kingdom: Animalia
- Phylum: Chordata
- Class: Mammalia
- Clade: Marsupialiformes
- Family: †Alphadontidae
- Genus: †Turgidodon; Cifelli, 1990

Type species
- Turgidodon praesagus (Russell, 1952)

Other species
- Turgidodon rhaister (Clemens, 1966); Turgidodon russelli (Fox, 1979); Turgidodon parapraesagus (Rigby & Wolfberg, 1987); Turgidodon lillegraveni Cifelli, 1990; Turgidodon madseni Cifelli, 1990

Synonyms
- Alphadon rhaister Clemens, 1966; Delphodon? praesagus Russell, 1952; Alphadon praesagus (Russell, 1952) Sahni, 1972; Alphadon russelli Fox, 1979; Alphadon parapraesagus Rigby & Wolfberg, 1987

Extinct genus of marsupials

Turgidodon is an extinct genus of alphadontid marsupial from the Late Cretaceous of western North America.

== Naming ==
The genus was named in 1990 by Richard L. Cifelli for species that had previously been described as members of Alphadon, with the name after the Latin word Turgidus: "swollen". The type species is T. praesagus, first named in 1952 by Russell as a species of Delphodon for a tooth from the Oldman Formation of Alberta. As well, Turgidodon includes T. rhaister, named in 1966 by Clemens as a species of Alphadon from the Lance Formation, T. russelli, named in 1979 by Fox as a species of Alphadon also from the Oldman Formation, T. parapraesagus, named in 1987 by Rigby and Wolfberg as a species of Alphadon from the Forest Fauna, and two species named in 1990 by Cifelli: T. lillegraveni and T. madseni. Both T. lillengraveni and T. madseni are from the Kaiparowits Formation of Utah, and named after paleontologists important to the studies of early mammals.
