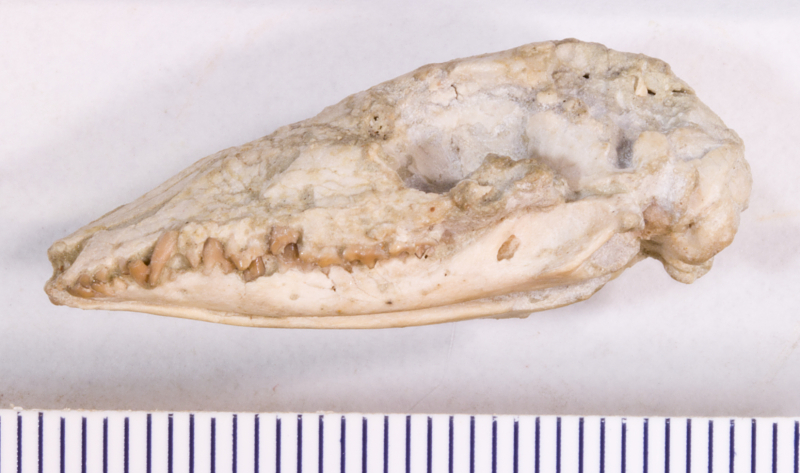
- Peratherium blainvillei skull at the Museum für Naturkunde, Berlin

Scientific classification
- Kingdom: Animalia
- Phylum: Chordata
- Class: Mammalia
- Family: †Herpetotheriidae
- Genus: †Peratherium; Aymard, 1850

= Peratherium =

Extinct genus of mammals

Peratherium is a genus of metatherian mammals in the family Herpetotheriidae that lived in Europe and Africa from the Early Eocene to the Early Miocene. Species include the following:

- Peratherium africanum
- Peratherium antiquum
- Peratherium bretouense
- Peratherium cayluxi
- Peratherium constans
- Peratherium cuvieri
- Peratherium elegans
- Peratherium lavergnense
- Peratherium matronense
- Peratherium monspeliense
- Peratherium perrierense
- Peratherium sudrei
