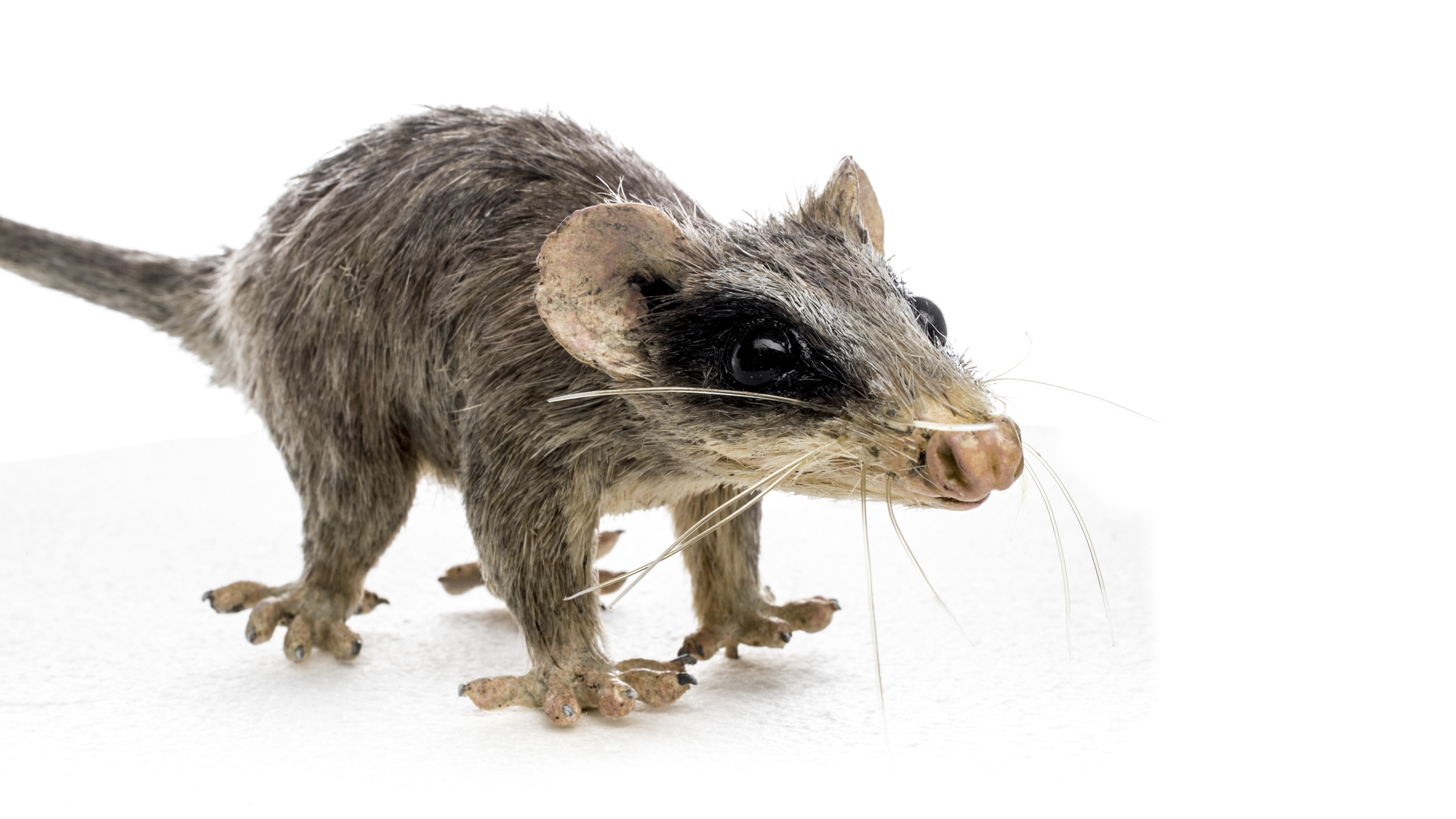
- Reconstruction of Alphadon sp.

Scientific classification
- Domain: Eukaryota
- Kingdom: Animalia
- Phylum: Chordata
- Class: Mammalia
- Clade: Marsupialiformes
- Family: †Alphadontidae; Marshall et al. 1990

Genera
- Albertatherium; Alphadon; Eoalphadon; Turgidodon

= Alphadontidae =

Alphadontidae Temporal range: Late Cretaceous, 99.6–66.0 Ma

Extinct family of mammals

Alphadontidae was a family of mammals belonging to the clade Metatheria, the group of mammals that includes modern-day marsupials.
