= Pediomys =

Pediomys Temporal range: Late Cretaceous, Campanian–Maastrichtian

Scientific classification
- Kingdom: Animalia
- Phylum: Chordata
- Class: Mammalia
- Clade: Marsupialiformes
- Family: †Pediomyidae
- Genus: †Pediomys; Marsh, 1889

Type species
- Pediomys elegans Marsh, 1889

Extinct genus of marsupials

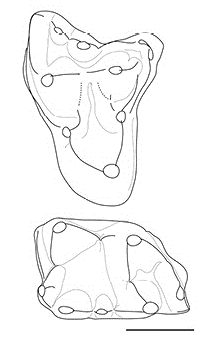
Pediomys upper and lower molars.

Pediomys is an extinct genus of pediomyid marsupial from the Late Cretaceous of North America.

== Naming ==
Named in 1889 for a molar from the Lance Formation by Othniel Charles Marsh, the type species P. elegans referred to its small size relative to other mammals from the late Maastrichtian formation. The species Protolambda hatcheri was moved into Pediomys by Simpson in 1927, who also named the subfamily Pediomyinae to separate Pediomys from other members of Didelphidae. Pediomyinae was then expanded by the work of Clemmens in the 1960s, who elevated the subfamily to Pediomyidae and described the new species P. cooki, P. krejcii, and P. florencae, all from the Lance Formation. The new pediomyid species P. exiguus, P. clemensi, P. prokrejcii and the genus Aquiladelphis were then named by Fox and Sahni in the 1970s, with P. clemensi and P. prokrejcii from the Campanian Judith River Formation and suggested to be ancestral to P. cooki and P. krejcii respectively. The species P. fassetti has also been named, from the Fruitland Formation.

== Description and taxon ==
Pediomyidae and Pediomys expanded to include such a diversity of species and genera that it began to be suspected to be an artificial group. A revision of pediomyids by Brian M. Davis in 2007 recognized that only the type species P. elegans was within Pediomys, and the remaining species had to be reassigned. For P. exiguus, which was found to not be a member of Pediomyidae, Davis named the new genus Apistodon in reference to its unstrustworthy classification. The superfamily Pediomyoidea was named to include Pediomyidae, Aquiladelphidae and Glasbiidae, with Pediomyidae including a restricted Pediomys, the new genus Leptalestes, and Protolambda. P. hatcheri, P. florencae and P. clemensi were moved to Protolambda, and P. krejcii, P. prokrejcii (including P. fassetti), P. cooki were moved into Leptalestes. As a result, Pediomys is restricted to only P. elegans and an unnamed species from Prince Creek Formation, with its material including a large number of teeth from a variety of Lancian formations. Pediomys is an important taxon to the understanding of Late Cretaceous marsupials as it has been known for so long, and is possibly also the only one to have survived the K-T Extinction, with a possible molar from the Puercan Ravenscrag Formation. Material from the Dinosaur Park Formation is very similar to P. elegans but also likely represents a new species.

- - Apistodon
  - - Alphadontidae
    - Pediomyoidea
      - Glasbiidae
        Glasbius
      - Aquiladelphidae
        Aquiladelphus
      - Pediomyidae
        - Pediomys
          - Pediomys elegans
          - Prince Creek pediomyid
        - - Protolambda
            - ?Protolambda clemensi
            - - Protolambda hatcheri
              - Protolambda florencae
          - Leptalestes
            - ?Leptalestes cooki
            - - St. Mary River pediomyid
              - - Leptalestes krejcii
                - Leptalestes prokrejcii
