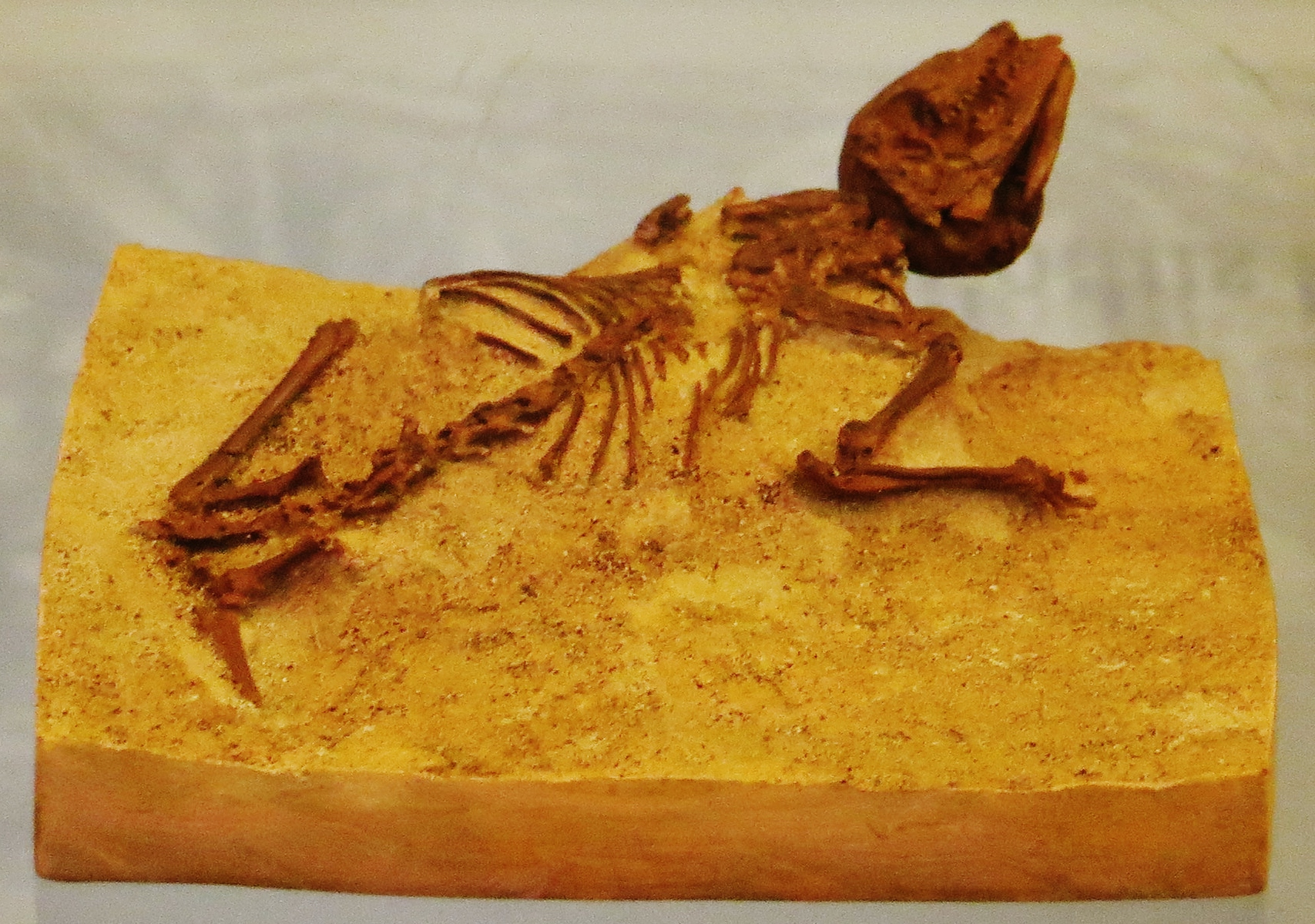
- Holotype of Asiatherium

Scientific classification
- Kingdom: Animalia
- Phylum: Chordata
- Class: Mammalia
- Order: †Asiadelphia
- Family: †Asiatheriidae
- Genus: †Asiatherium; Trofimov & Szalay, 1994
- Species: †A. reshetovi

Binomial name
- †Asiatherium reshetovi Trofimov & Szalay, 1994

= Asiatherium =

Asiatherium Temporal range: Late Cretaceous (Campanian) 83.6 Ma

Extinct genus of mammals

Asiatherium is an extinct genus of mammal, probably belonging to Metatheria. It lived during the Late Cretaceous, and its fossilized remains were discovered in Mongolia.

== Description ==
Skull of Asiatherium is 30 mm (1.2 in) in length. This animal was roughly the size of a mouse, and is known from a fairly complete articulated skeleton, preserving a complete skull. Its teeth resembled roughly those of marsupials; it possessed three premolars and four molars, and the mandible was slightly curved. Compared to Deltatheridium, Asiatherium was even more marsupial-like, due to its molars having paraconids lower than the metaconids, and the paired entoconid-hypoconulid cusps on the lower molars. The stylar platform of the upper molars was however narrower and the stylar cusps weaker than in primitive marsupials. The upper molars differed from those of marsupials in their expanded praecingula and postcingula.

== Classification ==
Asiatherium reshetovi was first described in 1994, based on fossils found in the Udan-Sayr locality of the Djadokhta Formation, in Mongolia. Asiatherium seems to be related to early marsupials, but probably was nested within a different clade of Metatherian, Deltatheroida, nested alongside Deltatheridium. The skeleton of Asiatherium looked like that of a basal Therian; epipubic bones, typical of marsupials, were present.

== References and Bibliography ==
- B. A. Trofimov and F. S. Szalay. 1994. New Cretaceous marsupial from Mongolia and the early radiation of Metatheria. Proceedings of the National Academy of Sciences 91:12569-12573
- T. E. Williamson, S. L. Brusatte, T. D. Carr, A. Weil, and B. R. Standhardt. 2012. The phylogeny and evolution of Cretaceous–Palaeogene metatherians: cladistic analysis and description of new early Palaeocene specimens from the Nacimiento Formation, New Mexico. Journal of Systematic Palaeontology 10(4):625-651
