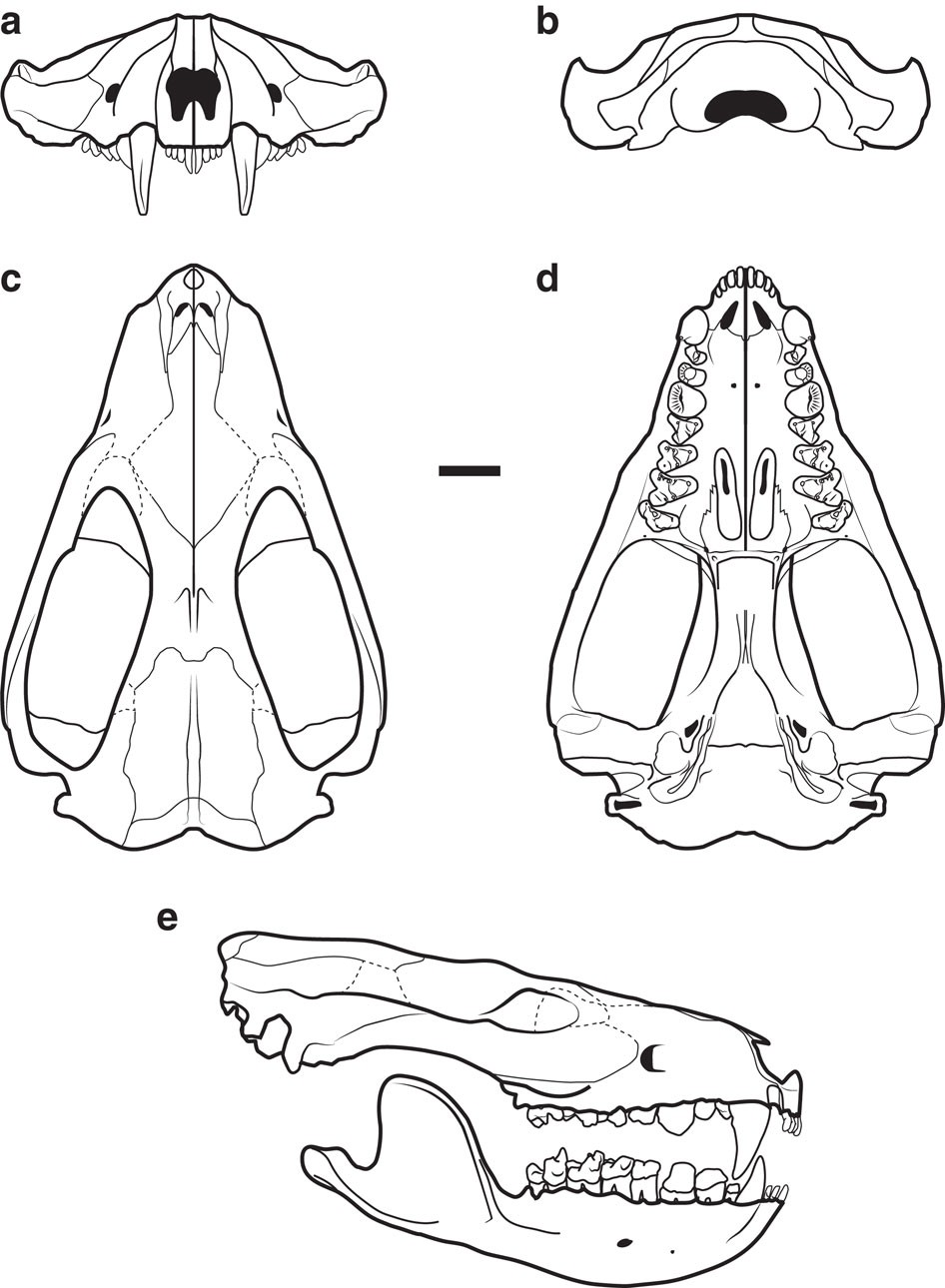
- Didelphodon skull diagram

Scientific classification
- Kingdom: Animalia
- Phylum: Chordata
- Class: Mammalia
- Clade: †Archimetatheria
- Family: †Stagodontidae; Marsh, 1889

Genera
- †Didelphodon †Eodelphis †Fumodelphodon †Hoodootherium †Pariadens? †Eobrasilia?

= Stagodontidae =

Stagodontidae Temporal range: Late Cretaceous, 92–66 Ma

Extinct family of mammals

Stagodontidae is an extinct family of carnivorous metatherian mammals that inhabited North America and Europe during the late Cretaceous, and possibly to the Eocene in South America.

== Description ==
Currently, the family includes four genera, Eodelphis, Didelphodon, Fumodelphodon and Hoodootherium, which together include some seven different species. In addition, the Cenomanian species Pariadens kirklandi might be a member of the family. Carneiro and Oliveira (2017) considered the species Eobrasilia coutoi from the early Eocene (Itaboraian) of Brazil to be a stagodontid; if confirmed it would make it the only known Cenozoic and the only known South American member of the family. Stagodontids were some of the largest known Cretaceous mammals, ranging from 0.4 to 2.0 kilograms (0.88–4.41 lb) in mass. One of the most unusual features of stagodontids are their robust, bulbous premolars, which are thought to have been used to crush freshwater mollusks, a diet that apparently evolved independently at least twice within this clade. Postcranial remains suggest that stagodontids may have been semi-aquatic. The most well described forms are found in Laramidia, but they are also present on Appalachian and South American sites, further leading credence to their aquatic habits. Cretaceous fossils were also found in France, suggesting a pan-Laurasian distribution for Cretaceous metatherians.

The evolution of Didelphodon and other large stagodontids (as well as large deltatheroideans like Nanocuris) occurs after the local extinction of eutriconodont mammals, suggesting passive or direct ecological replacement. They are considered rare in any given fauna they appear in, probably due to their specialised habits.

== Classification ==
Stagodontids were once thought to be closely related to the Sparassodonta, but later studies suggest they belong to a more ancient branch of the metatherian family tree, possibly closely related to pediomyids, being in particular closest to Pariadens, which forms the immediate outgroup to Stagodontidae. With the possible exception of Eobrasilia (see above), stagodontids are last known from the Maastrichtian, and are thought to have gone extinct in the K-T Extinction.

- Family Stagodontidae
  - Genus Didelphodon
    - Didelphodon coyi
    - Didelphodon padanicus
    - Didelphodon vorax
  - Genus Eodelphis
    - Eodelphis browni
    - Eodelphis cutleri
  - Genus Fumodelphodon
    - Fumodelphodon pulveris
  - Genus Hoodootherium
    - Hoodootherium praeceps
