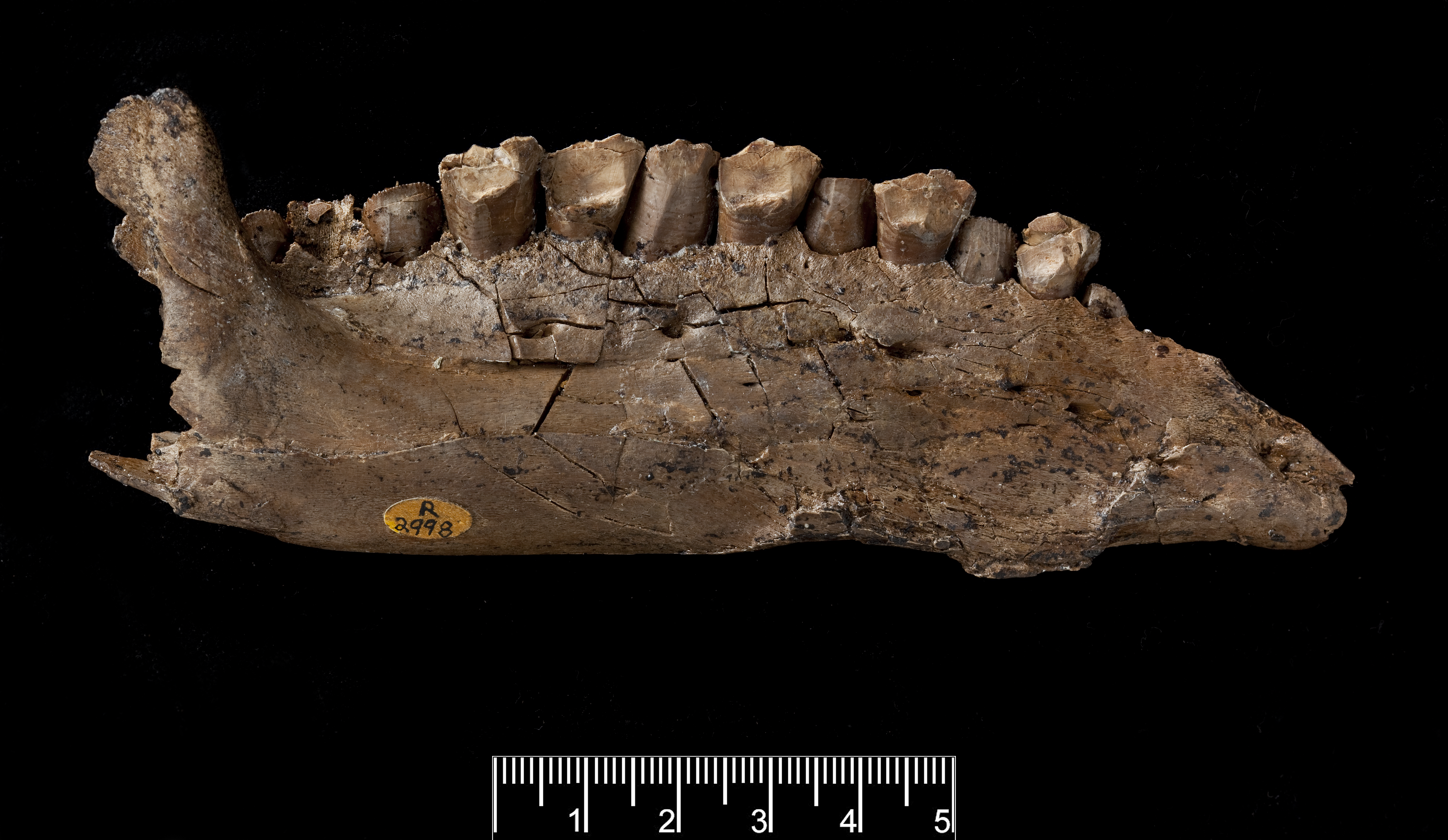
- Holotype NHMUK PV R 2998 in lateral view
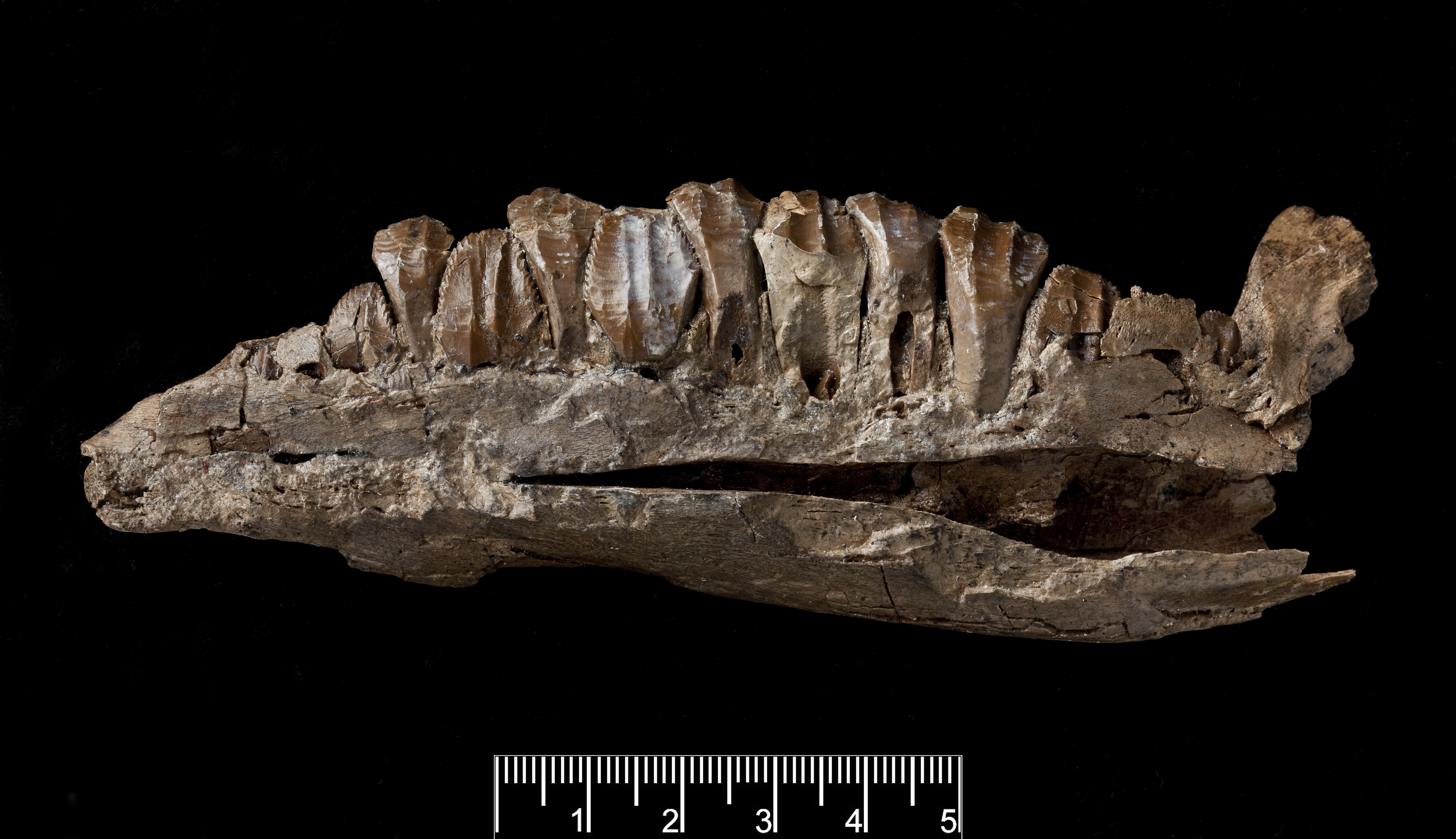
- Holotype NHMUK PV R 2998 in medial view

Scientific classification
- Kingdom: Animalia
- Phylum: Chordata
- Class: Reptilia
- Clade: Dinosauria
- Clade: †Ornithischia
- Clade: †Ornithopoda
- Clade: †Iguanodontia
- Clade: †Dryomorpha
- Genus: †Owenodon; Galton, 2009
- Species: †O. hoggii

Binomial name
- †Owenodon hoggii (Owen, 1874)

Synonyms
- Iguanodon hoggii Owen, 1874; Camptosaurus hoggii (Owen, 1974) Norman & Barrett, 2002

= Owenodon =

Owenodon Temporal range: Early Cretaceous, Berriasian

Extinct genus of dinosaurs

Owenodon is a genus of iguanodontian dinosaur known from a partial lower jaw discovered in Early Cretaceous-aged rocks of Dorset, United Kingdom, and possibly also Romania and Spain. The first and only definitive specimen was found in the Lulworth Formation of the Purbeck Limestone Group, dating to the middle Berriasian stage.

It was first described by Richard Owen as a species of Iguanodon, I. hoggii, honouring naturalist A.J. Hogg who had originally collected the fossil. Owen described the mandible as it was, partially embedded in a limestone block, but it was given to the Natural History Museum, London where it was accessioned as NHMUK PV R 2998 and further prepared. Some damage occurred to a tooth crown and part of the bone while stored in the collections. Redescription of I. hoggii by David Norman and Paul Barrett subsequently transferred the species to Camptosaurus in 2002, as well as tentatively referring other camptosaur-like material from the Purbeck beds to the species. The identity of the species was questioned, with Kenneth Carpenter and Yvonne Wilson, and Greg Paul, separating "C." hoggi from Camptosaurus as an intermediate ornithopod, until Peter Galton named the new genus Owenodon for it in 2009.

Galton removed the material assigned by Norman and Barrett from Owenodon, but referred isolated teeth from the Bauxite of Cornet, Romania, and the El Castellar Formation of Spain to O. hoggii. The taxon, believed by Galton to be intermediate between Camptosaurus and Iguanodon, is of uncertain relationships, with the limited material preventing clear understanding of its position within ornithopod evolution. Phylogenetic studies have found Owenodon to be more primitive, equivalent to, or more derived than Camptosaurus, but it is often excluded to improve results.

== History of naming ==
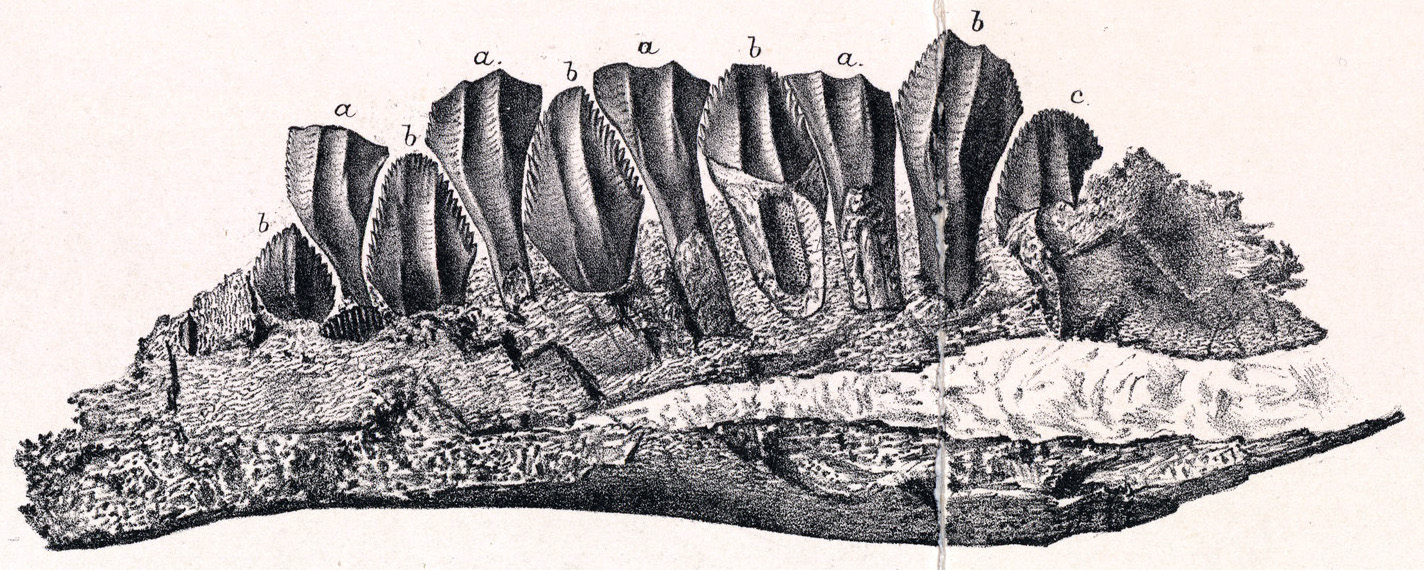
Holotype of Iguanodon hoggii (now Owenodon) as originally figured by Owen in 1874

A partial mandible discovered in the middle Purbeck Formation by A. J. Hogg was described in 1874 by British palaeontologist Sir Richard Owen. The fossil was found in a hard limestone known as "Under Feather", 1.2–1.5 m (4–5 ft) below the "Cinder Beds" which contain many shells of Ostrea distorta. At the time of its discovery, it was considered the first definitive material of Iguanodon from the Purbeck Formation, only preceded by a single large bone of the hand described by British palaeontologist William Buckland which likely washed out of the cliffs dividing the Greensand from the Purbeck. The mandible is a partially complete dentary bearing ten teeth, which show stronger primary and secondary ridges but weaker tertiary ridges than the teeth of larger Iguanodon material from the Wealden Formation, and as such Owen gave the mandible the new binomial name Iguanodon hoggii (often misspelled as I. hoggi). However, in the caption where the dentary was figured, Owen instead labelled the mandible as a young specimen of Iguanodon mantelli. The specimen was presented by Hogg to the British Museum of Natural History (now the Natural History Museum) in December of 1901, where it was acquired and given the specimen number NHMUK PV R 2998. Owen's description of the specimens provenance suggests it was collected in the Cherty Freshwater Beds of the middle Purbeck where it was found in Durlston Bay, which is middle Berriasian in age as part of the Tirnovella occitana zone. While it was originally described based on the partially-prepared inner surface of the mandible embedded in limestone, the mandible was fully prepared in 1975 using acetic acid and is cleared of matrix, but was damaged between 1977 and 1998 breaking one tooth crown and a part of the rear margin. The "Under Feather" locality from which the specimen was found is now called the Cherty Freshwater Member of the Lulworth Formation, part of the Purbeck Limestone Group.

Redescription of Iguanodon hoggii by British palaeontologists David B. Norman and Paul M. Barrett in 2002 found that I. hoggii was a species of Camptosaurus instead, creating the new combination Camptosaurus hoggii. This referral was made as the dentary of I. hoggii showed similarities to Camptosaurus dispar and Camptosaurus prestwichii in the count of teeth and the structure of tooth ridges, while the species Iguanodon atherfieldensis had a much greater number of teeth and consistent fluting around the crowns despite overall similarities in tooth ridges. Norman and Barrett also considered other material from the Purbeck to possible belong to C. hoggii (as cf. C. hoggii). From Dorset was referred the partial femur Cambridge University Sedgwick Museum specimen X.29337, the dorsal centrum of a juvenile NHMUK 46785, the foot phalanx NHMUK PV R 2942, and the crushed limb bone Dorset Museum specimen G.350, from Buckinghamshire was referred the foot phalanx Buckinghamshire County Museum specimen 467/22, and from Yorkshire was referred the femur, tibia, fibula, and astragalus NHMUK PV R 8676. All referrals were based on general similarities to ornithopods and Camptosaurus, to which C. hoggii was the closest species in geography and age. However, the systematic position of C. hoggii was considered provisional as the type mandible was not very diagnostic and related genera were of uncertain phylogenetic placement.

The referral of Iguanodon hoggii to Camptosaurus was challenged by American palaeontologists Kenneth Carpenter and Yvonne Wilson in 2008, who described the new species Camptosaurus aphanoecetes and found it more similar to C. dispar than Camptosaurus hoggii was. As a result, they removed Iguanodon hoggii from Camptosaurus and left it as an unnamed euornithopod, "Camptosaurus" hoggii. In 2008 American palaeontologist Greg Paul also removed Iguanodon hoggii from Camptosaurus, as it was too incomplete. Paul recommended that I. hoggi was considered an undiagnostic nomen dubium, and an indeterminate species of Ornithopoda or Camptosauridae. American palaeontologist Peter Galton redescribed NHMUK PV R 2998 in 2009 in a review of Lower Cretaceous ornithopods from England, where differences that prevented referral to both Iguanodon in the teeth and Camptosaurus in the dentary were identified, and as such Galton gave the new genus name Owenodon for the species. Owenodon hoggii was considered to be intermediate between Camptosaurus and iguanodontoids, likely referrable to the clade Styracosterna. Galton also reevaluated the referred material of Norman and Barrett, considering the femur CAMSM X.29337 to be an iguanodontoid separate from Owenodon, the dorsal centrum (NHMUK 46785) to be an undiagnostic euornithopod, and the partial hindlimb NHMUK PV R 8676 was referred to the species Iguanodon hollingtoniensis. However, material from a Berriasian to Valanginian fissure fill of Bauxite of Cornet in Romania showing intermediate anatomy between Camptosaurus and iguanodontoids was tentatively referred to Owenodon sp., which includes teeth, a maxilla, frontal, braincase, vertebrae, humerus, carpals and a metacarpal, and a partial femur.

Further review of English and Belgian iguanodontian taxa by Norman in 2012 included a discussion of Owenodon and a rediagnosis of the taxon. The taphonomic crushing of the dentary caused some features thought to be unique to Owenodon, though its depth and the arch of the tooth row were likely anatomical. Norman considered the taxonomic status of Owenodon to be provisional, with the separation of Owenodon as its own genus being a subjective decision based more on stratigraphy and geography than anatomy. Galton also reviewed small ornithopods of England and Europe in 2012, removing the all the Romanian material except for maxillary and dentary teeth from Owenodon, but added a tooth from the Hauterivian to Barremian El Castellar Formation of Spain to Owenodon sp., expanding the geographic range of the genus.

== Classification ==
Originally named as a species of Iguanodon, Owenodon hoggii was associated with the various iguanodont species from southern England, which are now classified among the genera Iguanodon, Mantellisaurus, Barilium, and Hypselospinus. Camptosaurus, where O. hoggii was also referred, is a more primitive ornithopod than the iguanodonts, but still on the branch of ornithopods leading to hadrosaurs. As its own species and genus, Owenodon hoggii is a taxon of inconsistent and uncertain classification, but it shows similarities to the camptosaur and iguanodont areas of ornithopod evolution. In the first edition of The Dinosauria in 1990, Norman and David B. Weishampel retained I. hoggi (misspelled) within Iguanodon as a member of Iguanodontidae, but the second edition in 2004 had Norman place I. hoggi (misspelled) in Camptosaurus as one of two ornithopods within Ankylopollexia but outside Iguanodontoidea. Carpenter and Wilson moved "I." hoggi into Euornithopoda in 2008, while Paul considered it Ornithopoda or Camptosauridae incertae sedis the same year. In naming Owenodon, Galton classified it as a tentative member of Styracosterna less derived than Lurdusaurus, Equijubus, and Iguanodontoidea.

The onset of phylogenetics in ornithopod studies have at points incorporated Owenodon as an operational taxon, though it has also been removed from analyses after running in order to improve the resolution of relationships. The phylogenetic analyses of American palaeontologist Andrew T. McDonald and colleagues from 2010 to 2017 on have found Owenodon to be an early member of Ankylopollexia, either slightly closer to Iguanodon and Hadrosauridae than Camptosaurus but in an unresolved position with respect to Uteodon (alternatively Camptosaurus aphanoecetes) and Cumnoria (alternatively Camptosaurus prestwichii), in an unresolved position with respect to C. dispar but further from Iguanodon and Hadrosauridae than Uteodon and Cumnoria, or have had to remove Owenodon to achieve useful resolution. Alternatively, Owenodon was added to the analysis of Australian palaeontologist Matthew C. Herne and colleagues in 2019 where it was further from Iguanodon than Camptosaurus, either in an unresolved result between Ankylopollexia and Dryosauridae, or closer to Ankylopollexia. The phylogenetic analysis of Brazilian palaeontologist André O. Fonseca and colleagues in 2024 incorporated the analyses of McDonald and Herne together, and found Owenodon to be a clear member of Styracosterna more derived than Camptosaurus, Uteodon and Cumnoria, in a polytomy with or slightly more primitive than Hippodraco. The results of the analysis by American palaeontologist Karen E. Poole in 2022 found similar results, with the maximum parsimony results placing Owenodon more derived than Camptosaurus and Dakotadon and more primitive than Lanzhousaurus and later iguanodonts, in a polytomy with Theiophytalia and Iguanacolossus, while bayesian results had Owenodon as the sister to Iguanacolossus in a basal styracosternan clade alongside Theiophytalia and Dakotadon.

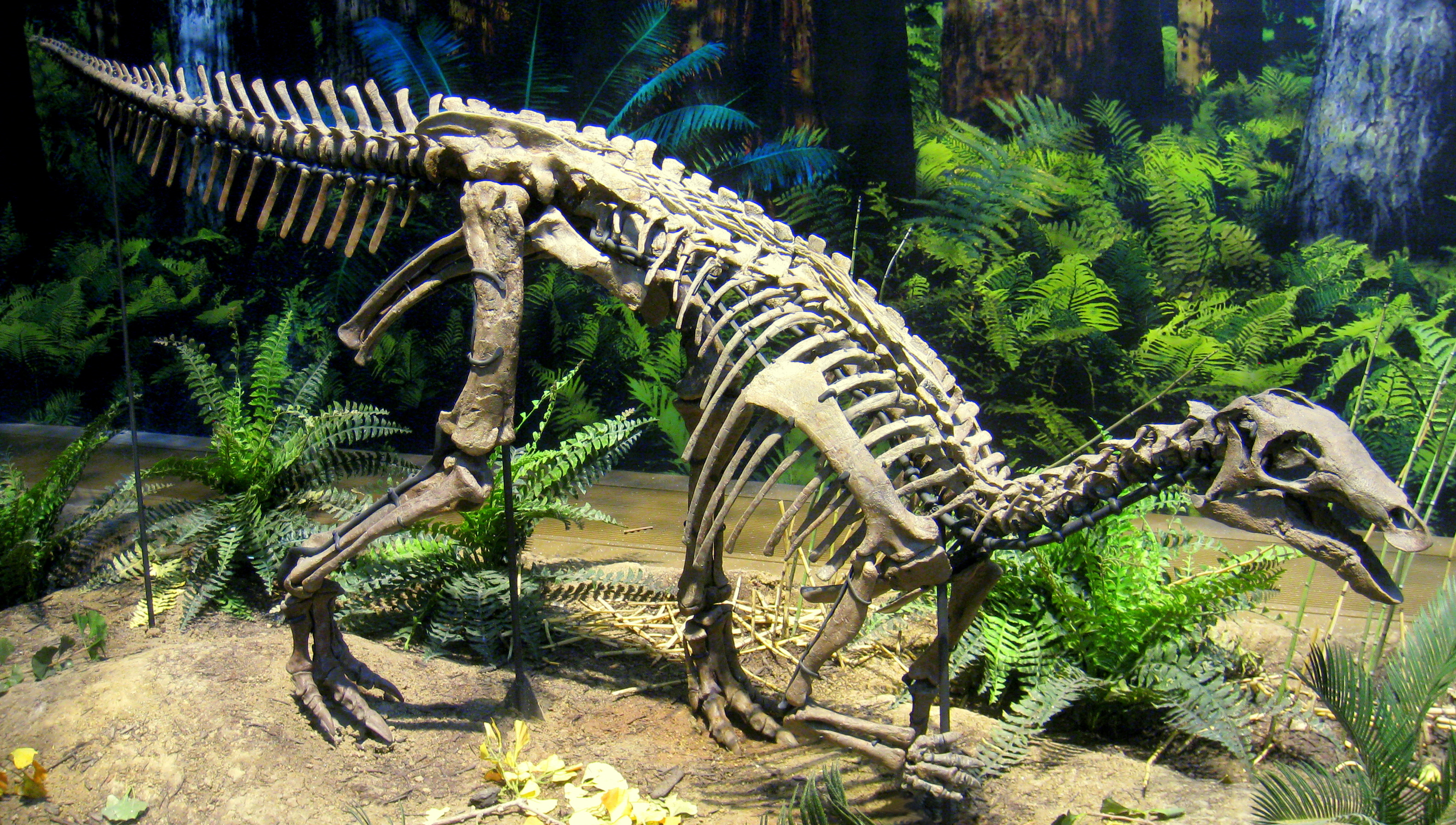
Skeleton of former Camptosaurus species Uteodon aphanoecetes

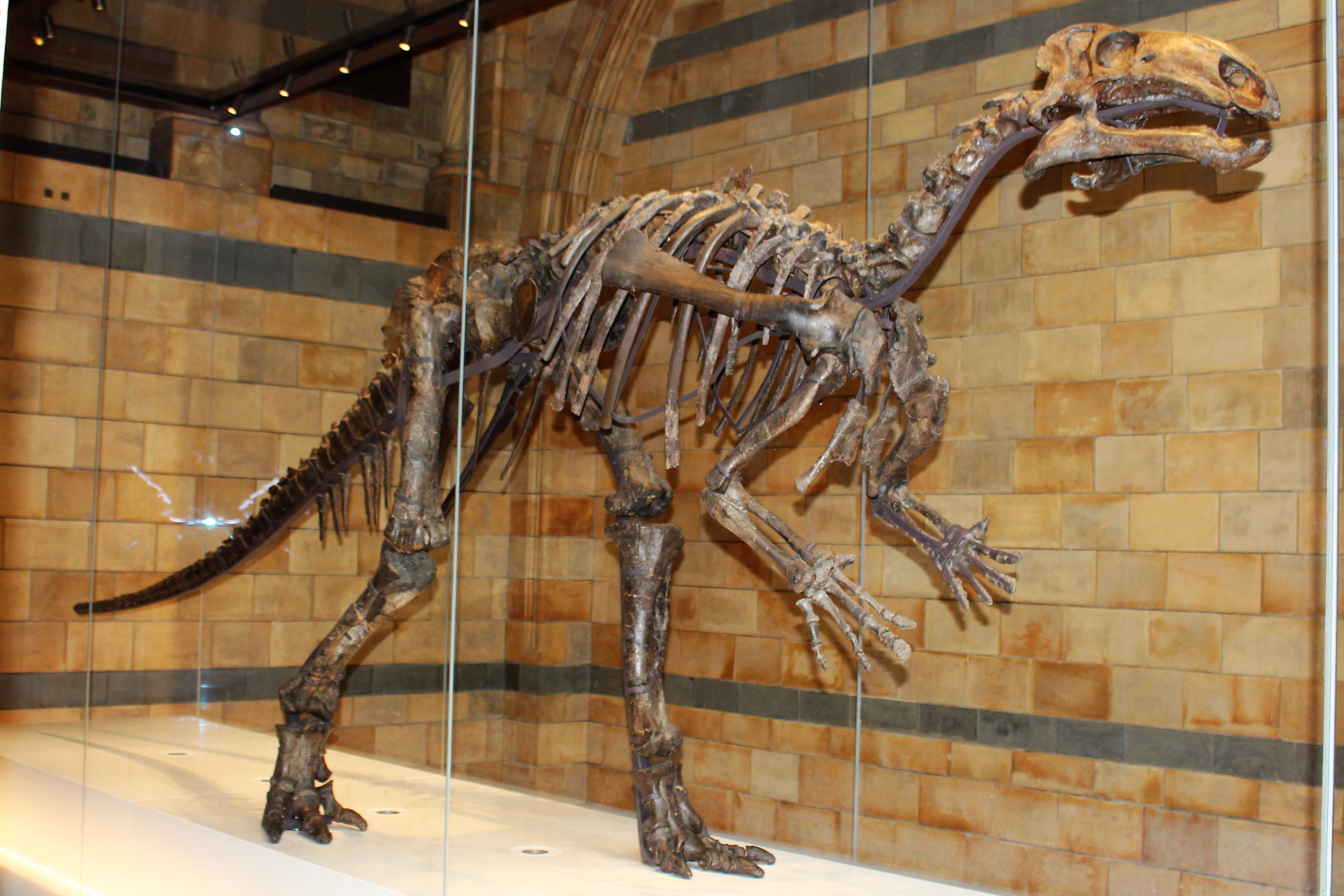
Skeleton of former Iguanodon species Mantellisaurus atherfieldensis

Equal weights of Fonseca et al. (2024)

- Dryomorpha
  - Dryosauridae
  - - CM 1949
    - - Oblitosaurus
      - - Ankylopollexia
          - Camptosaurus
          - Uteodon
          - - Styracosterna
              - Cumnoria
              - - Hippodraco
                - Owenodon
                - - Ouranosaurus
                  - - Hadrosauriformes
                      - Iguanodontidae
                      - Hadrosauroidea

Bayesian results of Poole (2022)

- Ankylopollexia
  - Uteodon
  - - Camptosaurus
    - - Styracosterna
        - Lanzhousaurus
        - - - - Iguanacolossus
              - Owenodon
            - - Dakotadon
              - Theiophytalia
          - - - - Barilium
                - Hypselospinus
              - - Bolong
                - - Lurdusaurus
                  - Jinzhousaurus
            - - - Ouranosaurus
                - - Hippodraco
                  - Xuwulong
              - - Iguanodontidae
                - - Mantellisaurus
                  - Hadrosauroidea

== Palaeoecology ==
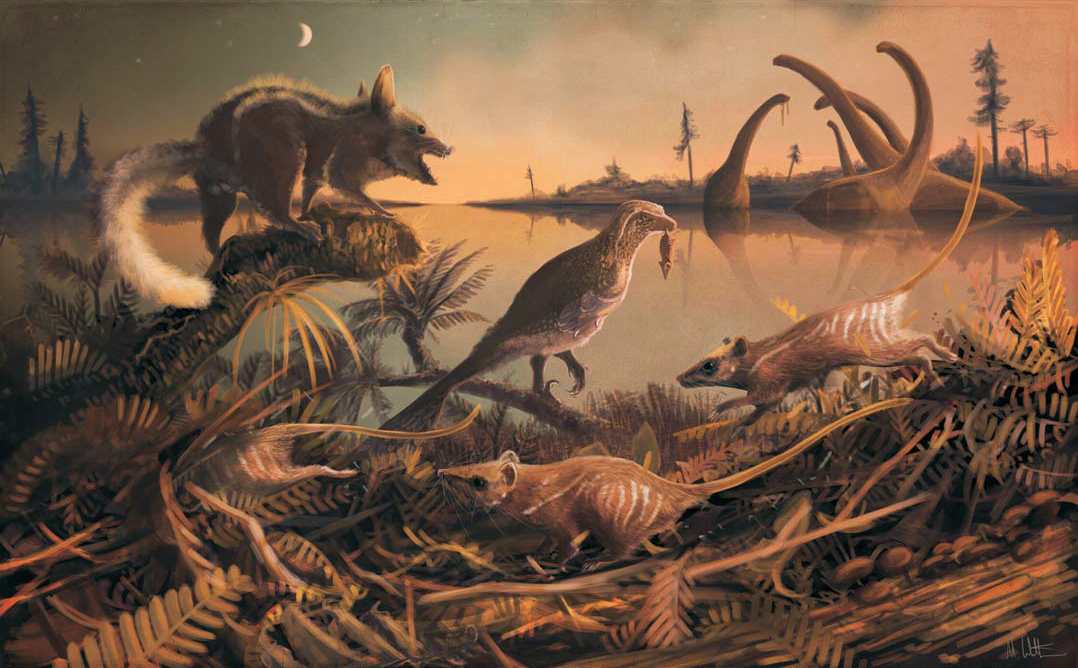
Environment of the Purbeck beds including the mammals Durlstodon (left), Durlstotherium (center and right) and the theropod Nuthetes

The Purbeck Group is a distinctive sequence of evaporites, thin sandstones and shelly limestones interbedded with marl and shales. Sedimentology shows they were deposited in a fluctuation of freshwater, brackish, hypersaline and quasi-marine environments. Flora and fauna are indicative of variable terrestrial, lacustrine, saline and lagoonal associations. The climate of the early Purbeck Group was likely similar to the modern Mediterranean and became wetter towards the end of the Berriasian. While the Purbeck Group was originally known as the informal Purbeck Beds, it can now be divided into the upper Durlston Formation and the lower Lulworth Formation. The "Upper Purbeck Beds" and a majority of the "Middle Purbeck Beds" are contained within the Durlston Formation, the oldest deposit of which is the Cinder Beds of the Stair Hole Member. The Cinder Beds have, at times, been considered the Jurassic-Cretaceous Boundary, which would result in the entire Lulworth Formation being latest Jurassic, Tithonian, in age. However, despite the uncertainties about the age of the beds because of a lack of correlation through fauna or dating, it is generally accepted that the Purbeck Group is entirely earliest Cretaceous in age, with the Lulworth Formation being early Berriasian. The Purbeck Group is visibly underlain by the Late Jurassic Portland Group in Durlston Bay and has a transitional but locally obscured boundary with the overlying Wealden Group at Peveril Point.

There is a great deal of uncertainty as to the location of the specimens collected from the Lulworth Formation; the only definitive way to test would be to analyse the matrix of each specimen to determine its salinity. The Purbeck Group has the most diverse ornithischian fauna of any deposit in Dorset, and is one of few Berriasian deposits globally, but is limited almost entirely to cranial or dental material, and tracks. Echinodon becklesii is the only other named ornithischian from the beds, and is a heterodontosaurid known from multiple partial jaws and teeth. A femur and dorsal of an intermediate hadrosauriform is also known, along with intermediate ornithopods and ankylosaurs known both from body fossils and from footprints. Beyond ornithischians, the Lulworth Formation also contains the theropod Nuthetes, amphibians, turtles, lizards, snakes, mammals and crocodilians, and varieties of invertebrates. Amphibians from the Lulworth Formation include the salamanders Apricosiren and an intermediate batrachosauroidid, the albanerpetontid Celtedens and the frog Sunnybatrachus. Four taxa of turtles are known, the cryptodires Dorsetochelys, Helochelydra, Hylaeochelys and Pleurosternon. The Purbeck is one of the most diverse Early Cretaceous deposits globally for lepidosaurians. The genera Becklesius, Dorsetisaurus, Durotrigia, Paramacellodus, Pseudosaurillus, Parasaurillus, Purbicella, Saurillus, Parviraptor and three unnamed tooth morphologies represent the known squamates, and fossils referred to the rhynchocephalians Homoeosaurus and Opisthias have also been found.

The diverse mammal assemblage includes the small eutherians Durlstodon and Durlstotherium; the non-eutherian peramurans Peramus, Peramuroides, Magnimus and Kouriogenys; the non-eutherian symmetrodonts Spalacotherium, Tinodon and Thereuodon; the non-eutherian dryolestoids Achyrodon, Amblotherium, Dorsetodon, Chunnelodon and Phascolestes; the non-eutherian multituberculates Albionbaatar, Bolodon, Gerhardodon, Plagiaulax and Sunnyodon; the non-eutherian eutriconodonts Trioracodon and Triconodon, the non-mammalian morganucodontan Purbeckodon; and the non-mammalian docodont Peraiocynodon. Crocodilians from within the Lulworth deposits include Goniopholis gracilidens, Theriosuchus pusillus, Pholidosaurus purbeckensis, dubious remains previously known as Goniopholis tenuidens, and the dubious taxon Macellodus brodiei. Specific sites within the formation also preserve the primitive snipe flies Simulidium and Pseudosimulium, and the nematoceran flies Eoptychoptera, Brodilka and Eucorethrina.
