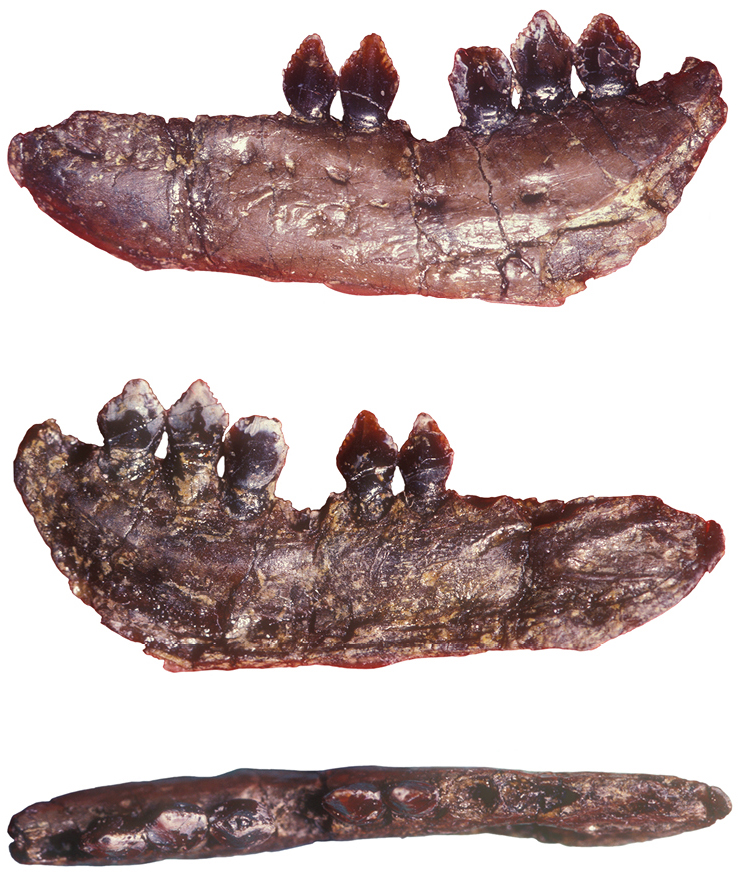
- Dentary of paratype specimen NHMUK 48215b

Scientific classification
- Kingdom: Animalia
- Phylum: Chordata
- Class: Reptilia
- Clade: Dinosauria
- Clade: †Ornithischia
- Family: †Heterodontosauridae
- Genus: †Echinodon; Owen, 1861
- Species: †E. becklesii

Binomial name
- †Echinodon becklesii Owen, 1861

= Echinodon =

Echinodon Temporal range: Early Cretaceous, Berriasian

Extinct genus of dinosaurs

Echinodon is a genus of heterodontosaurid dinosaur that lived during the earliest Cretaceous of southern England and possibly western France in the Berriasian epoch. The first specimens were jaw bones named Echinodon becklesii by Sir Richard Owen in 1861, and since their original description only additional teeth have been discovered. The specific name honours collector Samuel Beckles who discovered the material of Echinodon and many other taxa from across England, while the genus name translates as "prickly tooth" in reference to the dental anatomy of the taxon.

Originally, Echinodon was considered to be a type of herbivorous lizard, though this was quickly revised to an intermediate ornithischian. It was referred to the clade Stegosauria based on general dental anatomy and incorrectly referred armour that was later identified as a turtle's. Echinodon was then referred to the early ornithischian family Fabrosauridae, which was later identified as an artificial group with Echinodon reassigned to Heterodontosauridae. While the family was originally considered to be closest to more derived ornithopods, it was eventually reidentified as the most basal group of ornithischians, making Echinodon a taxon descended from many genera from the Early Jurassic, with a ghost lineage of 50 million years of unpreserved evolution.

All specimens of Echinodon have been found in the Purbeck Group of Dorset, which has been variably considered to be from the latest Jurassic or the earliest Cretaceous. Current studies accept an Early Cretaceous Berriasian age, making Echinodon both the youngest and the smallest heterodontosaurid. Other dinosaurs it lived alongside include the ornithopod Owenodon and the theropod Nuthetes, which are both also fragmentary. An abundance of small mammals also lived alongside Echinodon, and the sediments show that the Purbeck Group was a variably lagoonal environment initially similar to the modern Mediterranean but became wetter over time.

== History of discovery ==
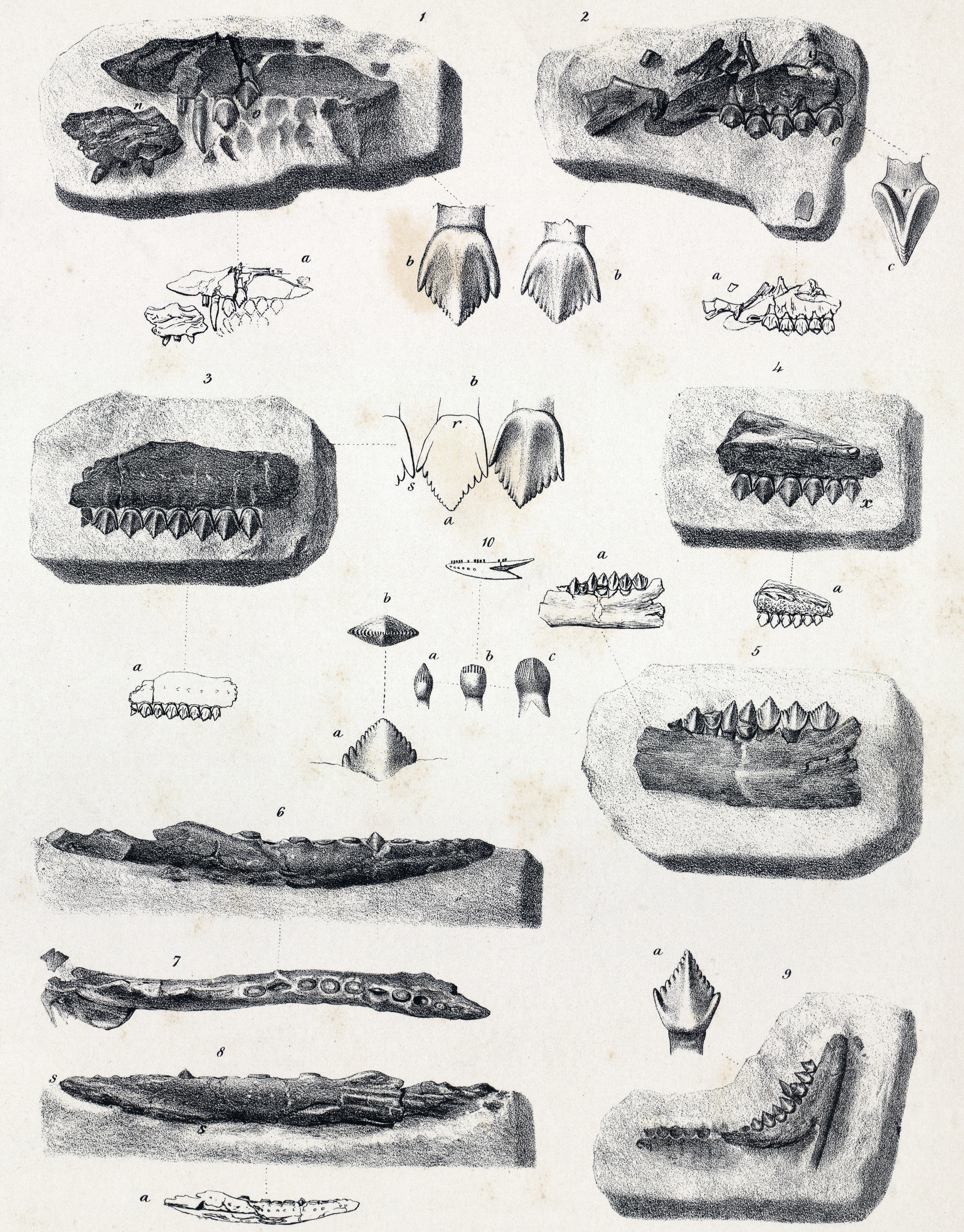
Teeth and jaw fragments referred to Echinodon, NHMUK 48209 to 48215

Multiple specimens of jaw bones were discovered by Samuel Beckles high on a cliff in Durdlestone Bay on the Isle of Purbeck in southern England. These fossils, including many teeth as well as maxilla and dentary bones of the upper and lower jaws, were found alongside shells and plant fossils in the Purbeck Beds. These were first described in a monograph published in 1861 written by Sir Richard Owen, a British palaeontologist who also described fossils of Iguanodon and Megalosaurus. Owen gave the name Echinodon becklesii for the fossils, which he considered to be part of the lizard clade Lacertilia. While the specific name honoured Beckles for his discovery of the fossils and allowing Owen to study his collection of Purbeck fossils, the generic name was derived from the Ancient Greek εχινος, 'hedgehog', and ὀδών, 'tooth', which Owen combined as "prickly tooth" to describe the anatomy of the serrations along the sides of the teeth. Owen had corresponded with British palaeontologist Hugh Falconer, who had suggested the name "Sauraechinodon", but as the shortened form Echinodon was not preoccupied, Owen chose to use the abbreviated form as the name for his new animal. Falconer issued a correction in 1861, specifying that he proposed the name "Sauraechmodon" instead of "Sauraechinodon".

Although originally described as a lacertilian by Owen, he revised his classification in 1874 to group Echinodon with Scelidosaurus and Iguanodon in a clade he called Prionodontia, which was within the larger clade Dinosauria. In 1888 British palaeontologist Richard Lydekker followed previous classification of Echinodon as a dinosaur based on the anatomy of its teeth, describing them as similar to Scelidosaurus although not referring them to a more specific clade than Dinosauria indeterminate. The series of specimens designated as types by Owen were purchased by the British Museum of Natural History (BMNH now NHMUK) in 1876 and form part of the Beckles Collection, bearing specimen numbers NHMUK 48209 to 48215. Lydekker also specified that Echinodon was found in the Middle Purbeck Beds, an informal unit of the modern Purbeck Limestone Group, the formal name for the historic Purbeck Beds. British palaeontologist Peter Galton narrowed down the depositional locality of Echinodon further in 1978 to the freshwater "Dirt Bed", also known as the "Mammal Pit" that was excavated by Beckles in 1857. However, no evidence exists to link Echinodon to any specific bed in the Lulworth Formation of the Purbeck Group. Galton also referred the specimen NHMUK 48229 to Echinodon, a fragmentary dentary with teeth, and the only further referrals to the genus includes isolated teeth also from the Purbeck beds.

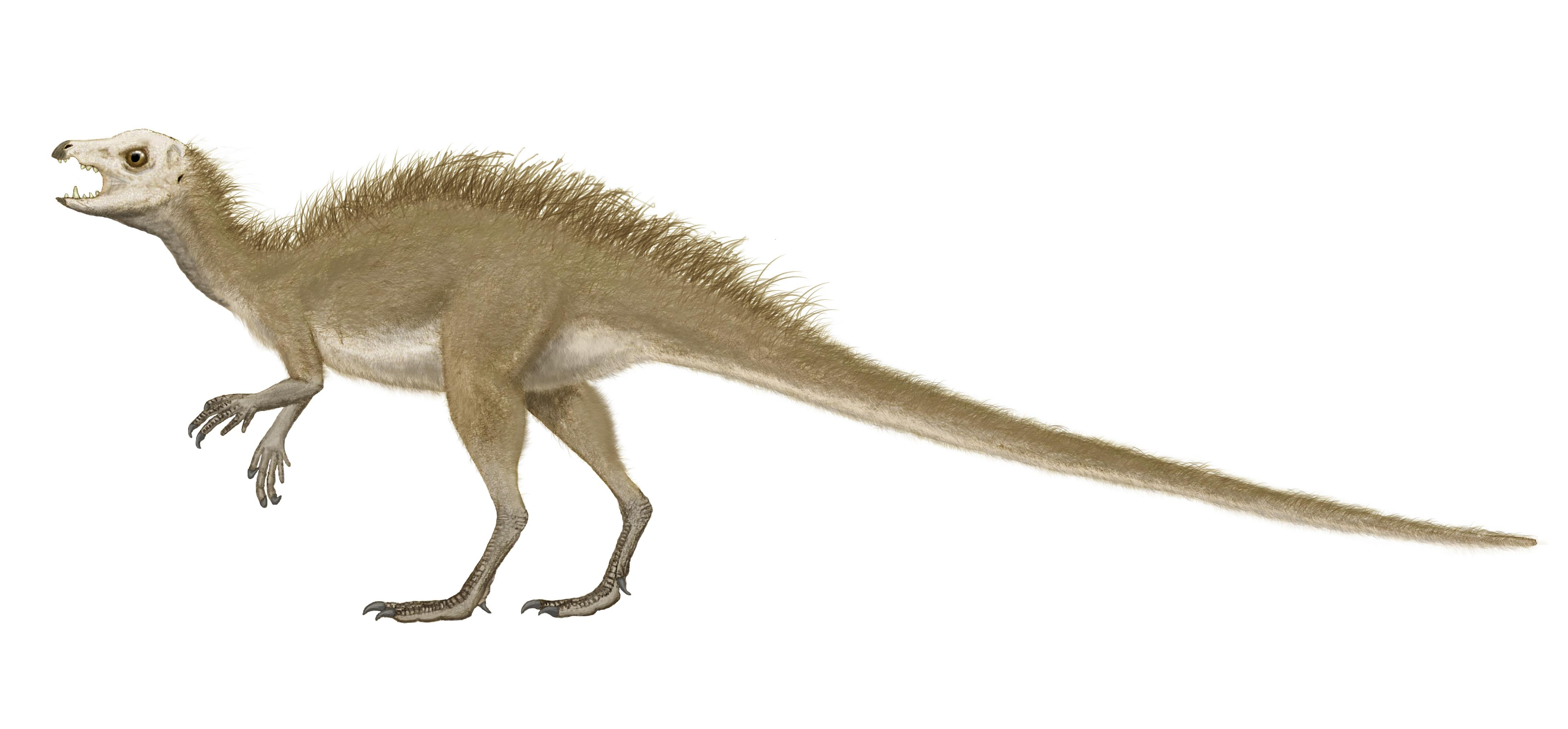
Life restoration of Fruitadens, originally Echinodon sp.

In the late 1970s and early 1980s, excavations of the Natural History Museum of Los Angeles County uncovered many small ornithischian fossils in the Fruita Paleontological Area of Colorado. These remains, collected from sandstones at the base of the Brushy Basin Member of the Morrison Formation, were approximately 150.2-150.3 million years old, and were initially described as intermediate fabrosaur remains by their collector George Calliston in 1984. Three years later Calliston revised his description and referred the material, including jaw bones, vertebrae and most of the hindlimb, to Echinodon sp., an assignment supported by Galton in 2002, although in 2006 he reconsidered the material and noticed differences in tooth anatomy from Echinodon proper. In 2009, these fossils were given their own genus, Fruitadens haagarorum, a related but distinct taxon from Echinodon.

In 2022 two premaxillary teeth from the Angeac-Charente bonebed of France were assigned to an indeterminate species of Echinodon. The teeth showed features interpreted as being most similar to Echinodon among ornithischians in the lack of denticles, and their assignment to the genus was used to support a Berriasian age for the bonebed.

== Description ==
Size comparison

The known material of Echinodon is limited to bones of the skull, but the multiple specimens include at least some of the premaxilla, maxilla, lacrimal, jugal, palatine, ectopterygoid and dentary along with most teeth of both the upper and lower jaws. Based on proportions of the related genus Heterodontosaurus, the skull of Echinodon would have been 62 mm (2.4 in) long, which is comparable to Tianyulong at 66 mm (2.6 in) but less than adults of Fruitadens at 75 mm (3.0 in) long, making Echinodon the smallest presumably adult heterodontosaur and one of the smallest non-avian dinosaurs.

The main body of both premaxillae are preserved in the lectotype specimen of Echinodon, although fractured and crushed. A premaxillary foramen is present near the anterior margin of the individual bone, and the fossa it is nested within is more similar in shape to Heterodontosaurus than more derived Hypsilophodon. The surface of the front of the bone along the toothrow is textured and lacks teeth, distinguishing the bone from that of Lesothosaurus which bears teeth along its entire length. The premaxilla bore only three teeth, lacking denticles (serrations) present in most basal ornithischians, although all teeth are subequal in size with the third being the largest.

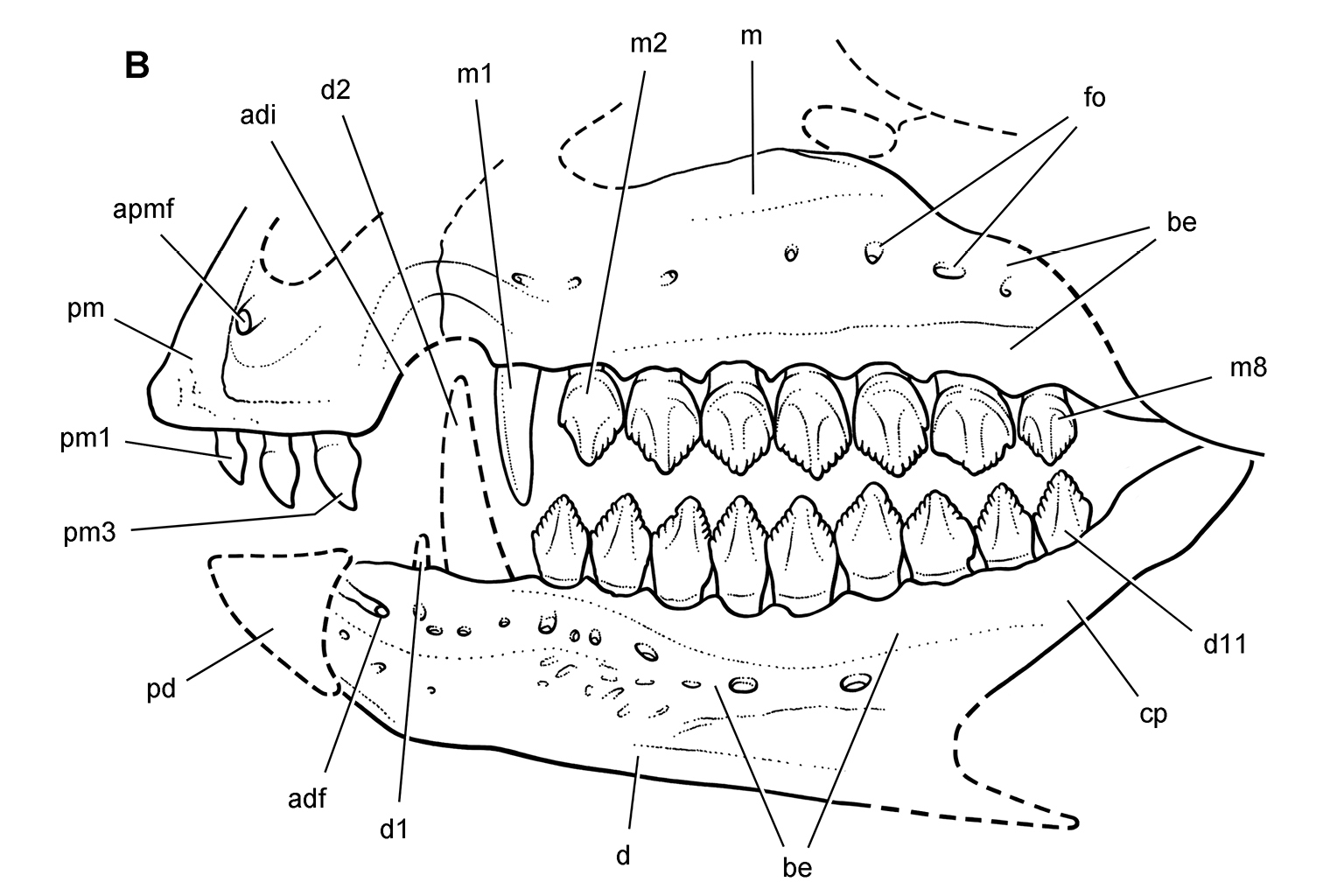
Reconstruction of the known skull of Echinodon from Sereno (2012)

Three maxillae are preserved among the material of Echinodon, preserving almost all the bone including most regions of contact with other cranial bones. The maxillae are slightly flattened, which minimises the strength of the buccal emargination, a diagnostic character of ornithischians where the maxillary tooth row and bone directly above it is inset from the outer edge of the bone. The presence of an arched diastema in Echinodon is a topic of disagreement. While Galton and American palaeontologist Paul Sereno interpret a diastema as present as in Heterodontosaurus, British palaeontologists David B. Norman and Paul M. Barrett concluded in 2002 that, based on the images of Owen prior to later damage of the fossil NHMUK 48209, a diastema was absent. Sereno reiterated in 2012 that a diastema was present and arched based on the maxilla NHMUK 48211. Nine teeth are present in the maxilla of Echinodon, the first being an enlarged and slender canine similar to those seen in the premaxilla of Lycorhinus and Heterodontosaurus. Owen also figured a partial tooth in front of the caniniform, but it has since been lost in damage to the material. While Norman and Barrett used this as evidence for a second caniniform smaller than the one behind, Galton in 1978 and Sereno in 2012 identified only one canine present. The first post-caniniform tooth of Echinodon is the largest, although only slightly taller than those following, which are all the same size. There is a round prominence along the middle of the tooth crowns, but there are no prominent ridges present on the crown. Eight to ten denticles are present on each side of the tooth crowns.

Little of the lacrimal, jugal, and palatine are preserved, although the margin of the orbit can be identified in the fragment of the lacrimal. The ectopterygoid bone of the palate is partially complete and preserved in articulation with the maxilla of NHMUK 48210. Lack of preservation limits the anatomical details that can be identified beyond its resembling the bone known in other ornithischians.

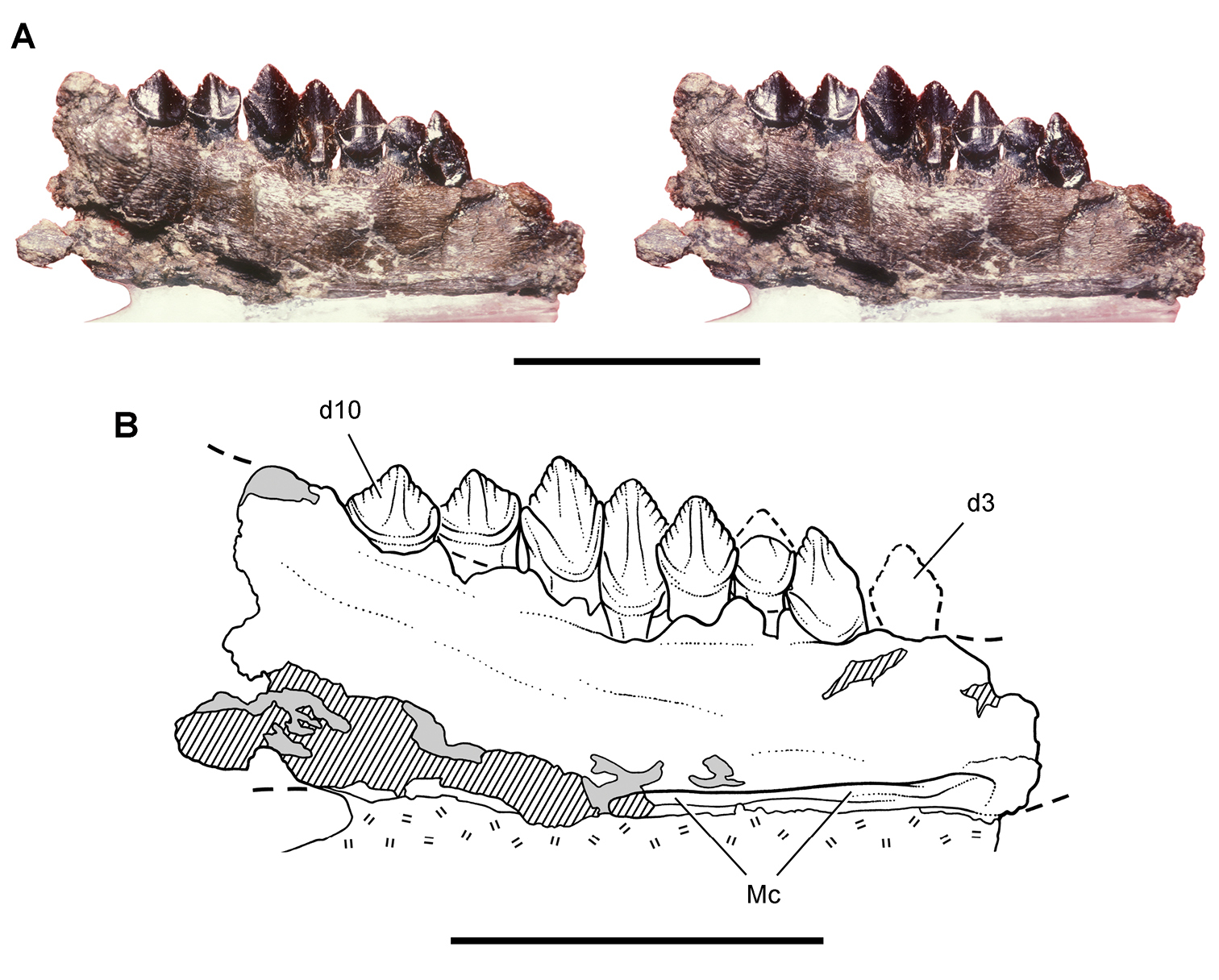
Left dentary of Echinodon NHMUK 48213 in medial view showing the anatomy of the tooth crowns

The predentary bone is not preserved in Echinodon, but its presence can be confirmed by the morphology of the anterior end of the known dentaries. Like in other heterodontosaurids, the predentary was only loosely articulated with the dentary in life, lacking lateral and ventral processes. The dentary was deep for a basal ornithischian, its height at mid-length being 30% of the total length. The bone tapers anteriorly along its length, although the margins are subparallel under the middle of the tooth row. A row of foramina are present along the margin of the buccal emargination, as in the maxilla. The coronoid process is prominent, unlike other basal ornithischians, although the contact between the dentaries is V-shaped as in basal ornithischians. There were 11 teeth in the dentary, the first two of which were specialised compared to most ornithischians. While specialised anterior teeth were not discussed by Galton in 1978, and were considered absent by Norman and Barrett in 2002, Sereno described the first two alveoli of Echinodon as differing in size from following teeth in 2012. The first alveolus was extremely reduced, indicating a small peg-like first dentary tooth as in Lycorhinus, and the second was significantly enlarged indicating a caniniform larger than the one in the maxilla. The regular dentary teeth were slightly taller than those of the maxilla and bore denticles along the top half of the crown instead of the top 25%. As in the maxilla, the crowns has a medial bulge, eight to ten denticles on either side of the tip, and symmetrical enamel.

== Classification ==
Owen originally classified Echinodon as a herbivorous lizard, he revised its placement to one within Dinosauria. Echinodon was considered an intermediate, potentially ornithischian, dinosaur until it was referred by Franz Nopcsa to the clade Scelidosaurinae within Stegosauridae in 1928 based on a tall coronoid process and tapering teeth, both of which are considered widespread within ornithischians. Isolated dermal armour found in the Purbeck Beds was referred to Echinodon on the basis of a stegosaurian classification by Justin Delair in 1959, although these have since been reassigned to solemydid turtles.

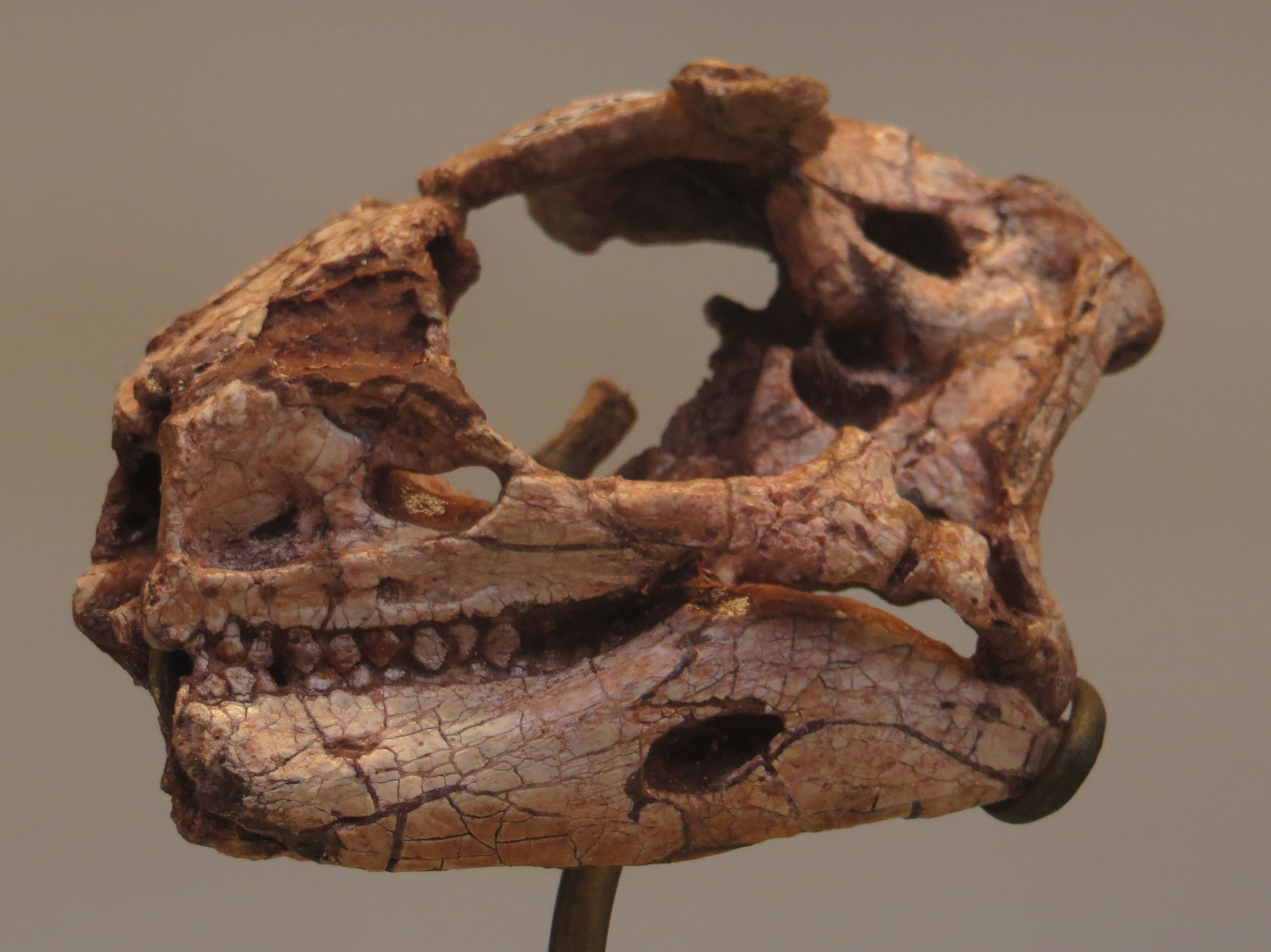
Partial skull of Lesothosaurus, a proposed relative of Echinodon within Fabrosauridae

Classifications of many basal ornithischians were reviewed by Richard Thulborn in 1971, where he placed Echinodon within Hypsilophodontidae: derived from Triassic forms lacking canines (termed "fabrosaurs"), close to the Jurassic genera Laosaurus and Nanosaurus, and more primitive than the Cretaceous genera Hypsilophodon, Parksosaurus and Thescelosaurus. Galton published a rebuttal the following year, disagreeing with Thulborn's use of Hypsilophodontidae. As teeth in the premaxilla, one of Thulborn's diagnostic traits for the family, were a primitive feature, Galton argued they should not be used to classify ornithopods. Instead, Fabrosaurus and Echinodon were united in the new family Fabrosauridae based on laterally positioned teeth, and removed from Hypsilophodontidae. Galton followed up on this classification with the naming of the genus Lesothosaurus in 1978, and along with its description reviewed the anatomy of multiple basal ornithischian genera, including Echinodon, Nanosaurus and Fabrosaurus. All but Echinodon were definitively referred by him to Fabrosauridae, although the placement of Echinodon was questionable as it also bore similarities to the clade Heterodontosauridae, known to possess enlarged canine teeth as well. However, Galton considered a fabrosaurid identity more likely as the teeth of the taxon lack flat wear facets.

Sereno was the first to reclassify Echinodon as a member of the family Heterodontosauridae. In 1991, he revised the cranial anatomy of Lesothosaurus, and compared it to a large number of other basal ornithischians. The teeth of Echinodon, in fact, were interpreted to possess flat wear facets on its teeth, as well as having teeth inset from the edge of the maxilla like in ornithischians more derived than Lesothosaurus. As these were what was suggested to unite the genus with "fabrosaurs", Sereno considered Echinodon to be a heterodontosaurid based on the presence of canines and arched gaps in the front of the tooth row. Heterodontosaurus, Abrictosaurus and an undescribed form from the Kayenta Formation were also placed within the family. Norman and Barrett redescribed Echinodon in 2002 and supported the heterodontosaurid classification but instead referred it to the clade based on the lacking foramina on tooth-bearing bones and possessing denticles restricted to the top third of the crown.

Although a placement as a heterodontosaurid for Echinodon has been supported in further analyses including some of the first phylogenetic analyses of ornithischians, the placement of the family itself has changed over time. The family, either excluding Echinodon as in Thulborn's 1971 study, or including the genus as in Galton's and Sereno's work, was originally considered to be a group of basal ornithopods more derived than ankylosaurs and stegosaurs. Further research, including the extensive phylogenetic analysis of British palaeontologist Richard J. Butler and colleagues in 2008 supported heterodontosaurids as the most basal ornithischians instead. A revised analysis by Butler et al. in 2011 also resolved a basal placement for heterodontosaurids, and resolved internal relationships of the family, with Echinodon being a basal genus in the family along with Abrictosaurus as well. Following additional analysis by South American palaeontologist Diego Pol and colleagues in 2011, Echinodon was resolved as a basal ornithischian, yet not within the family Heterodontosauridae. Pol et al. considered that the placement outside Heterodontosauridae was not because it was not within the family but instead because of the incomplete nature of its remains.

The cladogram below follows the analysis by Sereno in 2012, including the validly named heterodontosaurids described at the time. The clade including the Late Jurassic and Early Cretaceous Echinodon, Fruitadens and Tianyulong was poorly supported based on few dental features.

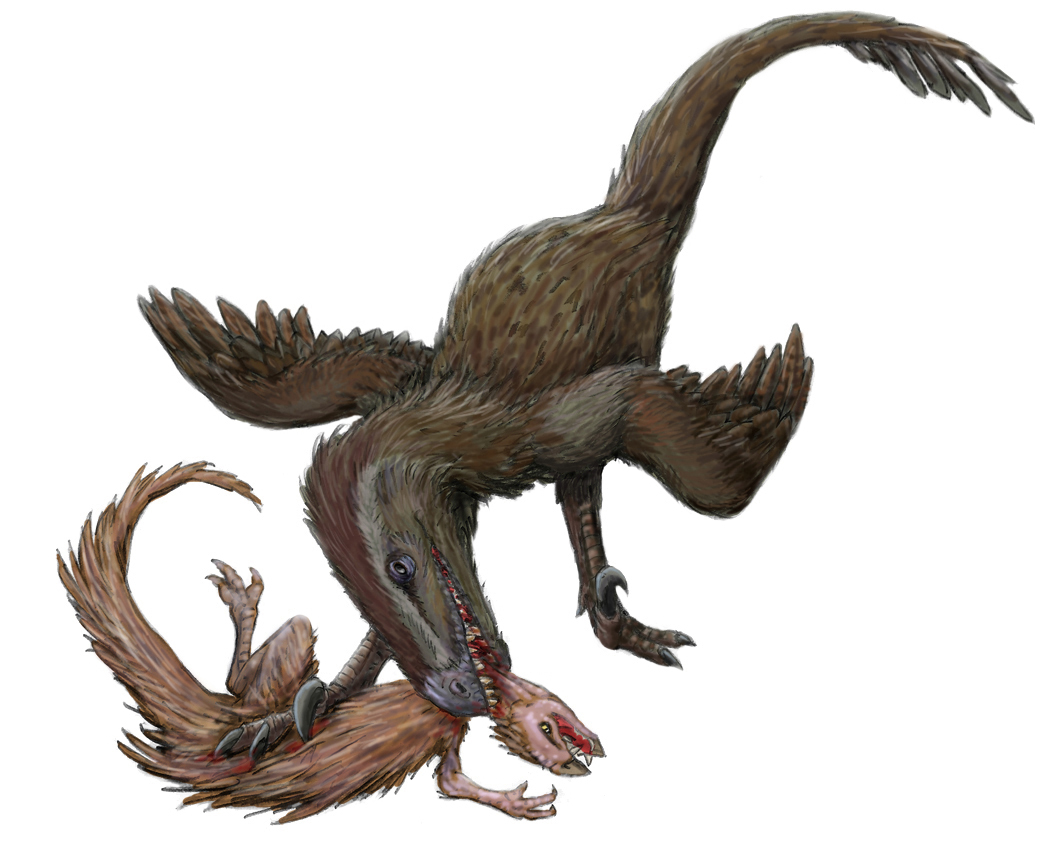
Echinodon being attacked by a Nuthetes, hypothetically restored as a dromaeosaur

- Heterodontosauridae
  - - Echinodon
    - Fruitadens
    - Tianyulong
  - Heterodontosaurinae
    - Lycorhinus
    - - - Pegomastax
        - Manidens
      - - Abrictosaurus
        - Heterodontosaurus

According to the resolution of the 2012 analysis conducted by Sereno, Echinodon and the other Laurasian heterodontosaurids were excluded from the clade of Gondwanan heterodontosaurids. Echinodon, Fruitadens, Tianyulong and the undescribed Kayenta heterodontosaurid all bear low-crowned teeth unlike the Gondwanan forms, as well as a lobular cingulum and a prominent anterior groove leading to a foramen on the lateral surface of the dentary. All but the Kayenta heterodontosaurid are also significantly younger than the remaining heterodontosaurids, and the presence of the three united in a clade excluding other taxa implied an unknown lineage of heterodontosaurids that lasts 50 million years through the Jurassic. Missing data for this ghost lineage may be due to the exceptionally small size of the group.

Following the earlier results of Chinese palaeontologist Xu Xing and colleagues in 2006, where the clade Heterodontosauriformes was created to unite heterodontosaurs, ceratopsians and pachycephalosaurs, French palaeontologist Paul-Emile Dieudonné and colleagues proposed that Echinodon and other heterodontosaurs were early forms of pachycephalosaurs. Their results placed the Echinodon as the sister taxon to the taxa typically classified within Pachycephalosauria, followed by Tianyulong, while all other heterodontosaurs studied formed a group at the origins of the clade. This hypothesis would reduce the ghost lineage of pachycephalosaurs and pull back the origins of cerapods back to the Early Jurassic. This result for heterodontosaurids was not supported by the subsequent analysis of Brazilian palaeontologist André Fonseca and colleagues in 2024 who instead found strong support for heterodontosaurids as early ornithischians, with Echinodon consistently the closest relative of Fruitadens and generally similar results to those of Sereno.

== Palaeobiology ==
The anatomy of Echinodon and other heterodontosaurids is poorly known; most palaeobiological aspects are based on the almost-complete genus Heterodontosaurus. Wear facets on the crowns of Heterodontosaurus indicate occlusion across the top of the tooth, unlike the implied jaw motion in other forms like Echinodon where the wear facets are only on the sides of the crowns. Despite the unique jaw motion of Heterodontosaurus compared to more primitive heterodontosaurids, the function of the enlarged canines was likely the same across the clade. Based on the presence of wear along the tips of the premaxillary crown and the movement of the dentary caniniform relative to other teeth as the jaw closed, according to Sereno in 2012, the primary function of the premaxillary tooth row would be for cropping vegetation. This contrasts with the earlier hypotheses of Butler et al. in 2008 that the enlarged canines of the clade were for an omnivorous diet. The hypothesis of omnivory was also supported by Norman and colleagues in 2011 under the interpretation that the canines and premaxillary teeth lacked wear from cropping vegetation. The edentulous regions of the premaxilla and predentary likely were the basis for keratinous beaks as in other ornithischians.

=== Ecology ===
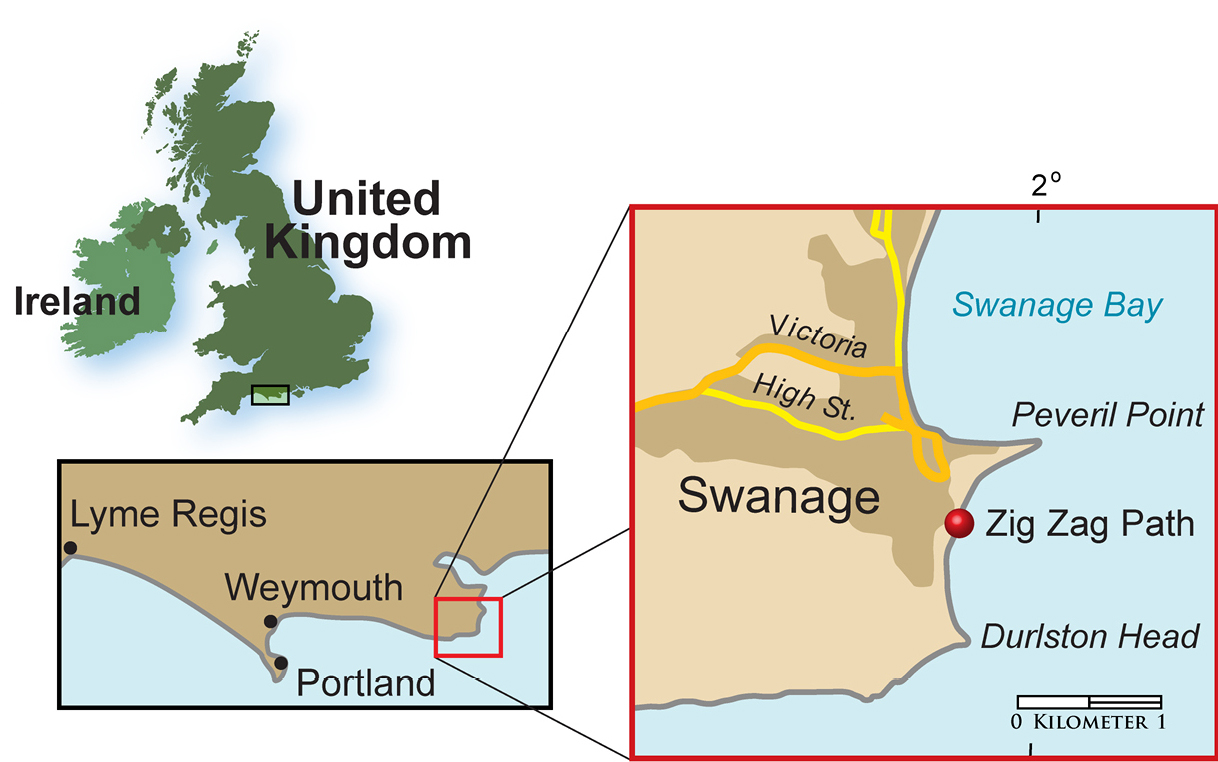
Locality (red dot) for Echinodon on the southern coast of England

The Purbeck Group is a distinctive sequence of evaporites, thin sandstones and shelly limestones interbedded with marl and shales. Sedimentology shows they were deposited in a fluctuation of freshwater, brackish, hypersaline and quasi-marine environments. Flora and fauna are indicative of variable terrestrial, lacustrine, saline and lagoonal associations. The climate of the early Purbeck Group was likely similar to the modern Mediterranean and became wetter towards the end of the Berriasian. While the Purbeck Group was originally known as the informal Purbeck Beds, it can now be divided into the upper Durlston Formation and the lower Lulworth Formation. The "Upper Purbeck Beds" and a majority of the "Middle Purbeck Beds" are contained within the Durlston Formation, the oldest deposit of which is the Cinder Beds of the Stair Hole Member. The Cinder Beds have, at times, been considered the Jurassic-Cretaceous Boundary, which would result in the entire Lulworth Formation being latest Jurassic, Tithonian, in age. However, despite the uncertainties about the age of the beds because of a lack of correlation through fauna or dating, it is generally accepted that the Purbeck Group is entirely earliest Cretaceous in age, with the Lulworth Formation being early Berriasian. The Purbeck Group is visibly underlain by the Late Jurassic Portland Group in Durlston Bay and has a transitional but locally obscured boundary with the overlying Wealden Group at Peveril Point.

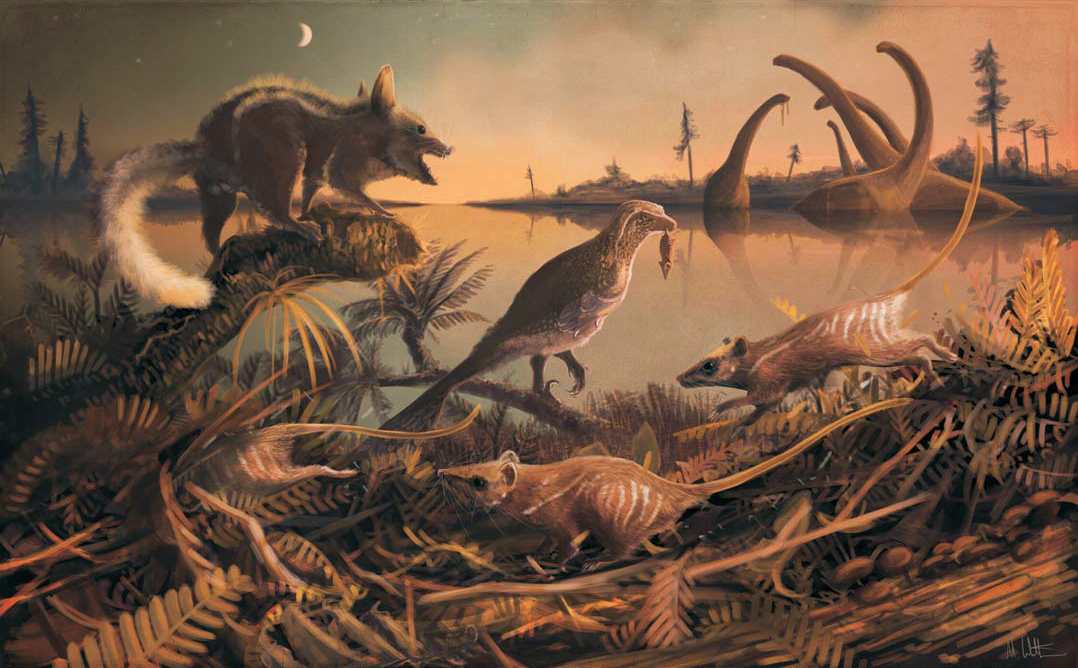
Environment of the Purbeck beds including the mammals Durlstodon (left), Durlstotherium (center and right) and the theropod Nuthetes

There is a great deal of uncertainty as to the location of the specimens collected from the Lulworth Formation; the only definitive way to test would be to analyse the matrix of each specimen to determine its salinity. The Purbeck Group has the most diverse ornithischian fauna of any deposit in Dorset, and is one of few Berriasian deposits globally, but is limited almost entirely to cranial or dental material, and tracks. Owenodon hoggii is the only other named ornithischian from the beds and is known only from a dentary with teeth originally described as a species of Iguanodon. A femur and dorsal of an intermediate hadrosauriform is also known, along with intermediate ornithopods and ankylosaurs known both from body fossils and from footprints. Beyond ornithischians, the Lulworth Formation also contains the theropod Nuthetes, amphibians, turtles, lizards, snakes, mammals and crocodilians, and varieties of invertebrates. Amphibians from the Lulworth Formation include the salamanders Apricosiren and an intermediate batrachosauroidid, the albanerpetontid Celtedens and the frog Sunnybatrachus. Four taxa of turtles are known, the cryptodires Dorsetochelys, Helochelydra, Hylaeochelys and Pleurosternon. The Purbeck is one of the most diverse Early Cretaceous deposits globally for lepidosaurians. The genera Becklesius, Dorsetisaurus, Durotrigia, Paramacellodus, Pseudosaurillus, Parasaurillus, Purbicella, Saurillus, Parviraptor and three unnamed tooth morphologies represent the known squamates, and fossils referred to the rhynchocephalians Homoeosaurus and Opisthias have also been found.

The diverse mammal assemblage includes the small eutherians Durlstodon and Durlstotherium; the non-eutherian peramurans Peramus, Peramuroides, Magnimus and Kouriogenys; the non-eutherian symmetrodonts Spalacotherium, Tinodon and Thereuodon; the non-eutherian dryolestoids Achyrodon, Amblotherium, Dorsetodon, Chunnelodon and Phascolestes; the non-eutherian multituberculates Albionbaatar, Bolodon, Gerhardodon, Plagiaulax and Sunnyodon; the non-eutherian eutriconodonts Trioracodon and Triconodon, the non-mammalian morganucodontan Purbeckodon; and the non-mammalian docodont Peraiocynodon. Crocodilians from within the Lulworth deposits include Goniopholis gracilidens, Theriosuchus pusillus, Pholidosaurus purbeckensis, dubious remains previously known as Goniopholis tenuidens, and the dubious taxon Macellodus brodiei. Specific sites within the formation also preserve the primitive snipe flies Simulidium and Pseudosimulium, and the nematoceran flies Eoptychoptera, Brodilka and Eucorethrina.
