= Purbeck Group =

Lithostratigraphic group in England

- Stratigraphic range: Tithonian–Berriasian
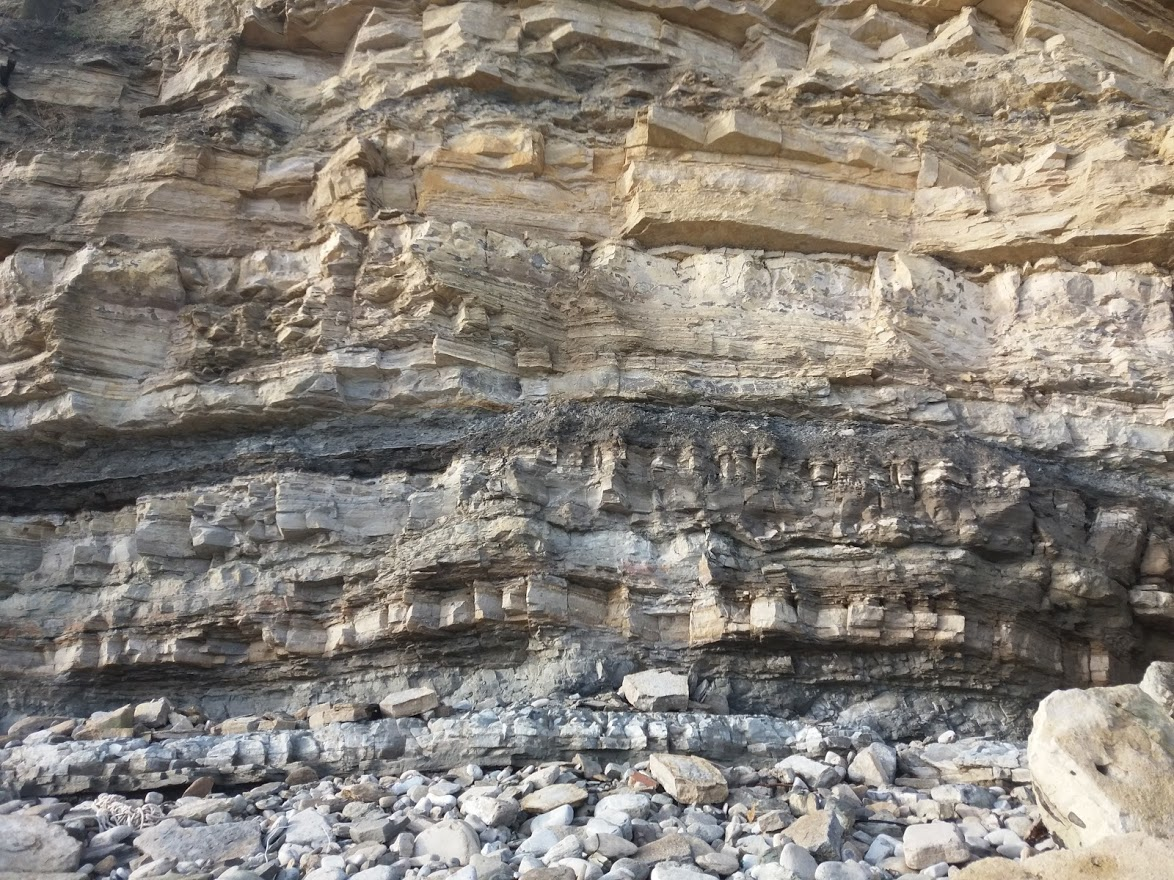
- Strata of the Purbeck Group in Durlston Bay, Dorset
- Type: Group
- Sub-units: Lulworth Formation, Durlston Formation and Haddenham Formation
- Underlies: Wealden Group
- Overlies: Portland Group
- Thickness: 45 to 120 m in South Dorset, 77 to 186 m in the Weald

Lithology
- Primary: Mudstone, Limestone
- Other: evaporites, chert

Location
- Region: Europe
- Country: United Kingdom
- Extent: Southern England

Type section
- Named for: Isle of Purbeck
- Location: Durlston Bay cliffs
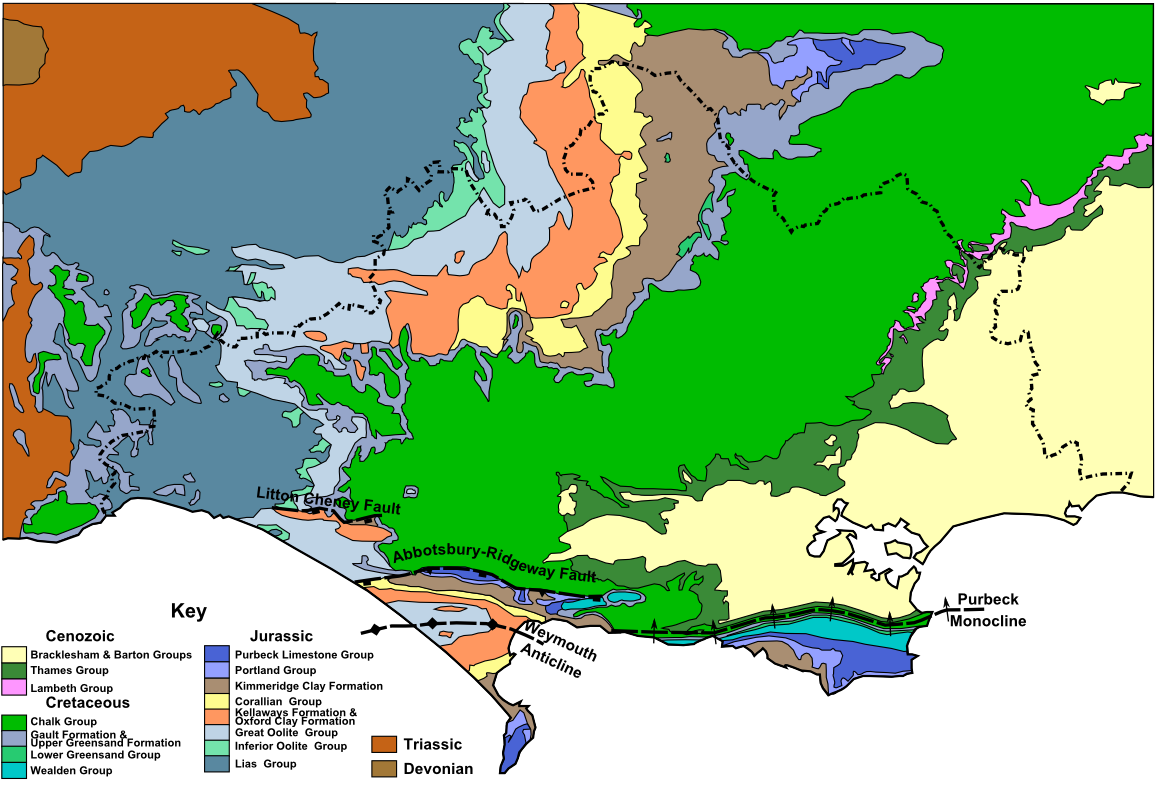
- Exposures of the Purbeck Group in Dorset shown in dark blue

The Purbeck Group is a lithostratigraphic group (a sequence of rock strata) in south-east England, spanning the latest Jurassic and earliest Cretaceous (late Tithonian to Berriasian stages) The name is derived from the district known as the Isle of Purbeck in Dorset where the strata are exposed in the cliffs west of Swanage. It is quarried for Purbeck stone, a common building material.

The Purbeck Group is famous for its fossils of insects, reptiles and early mammals. This sequence of rocks has gone by various names in the past including amongst others the Purbeck Beds, Purbeck Formation, Purbeck Limestone Formation and Purbeck Stone.

Rocks of this age have in the past been called the Purbeckian stage by European geologists. The Purbeckian corresponds with the Tithonian to Berriasian stages of the internationally used geologic timescale.

== History and stratigraphy ==
The stratigraphic organisation of the Purbeck Group has varied significantly over time since it was first labelled in 1816 for a section of limestone on the Isle of Purbeck. The labels Purbeck Limestone, Purbeck stone, Purbeck series and Purbeck strata were all used by Webster in 1816, with Purbeck Beds first used by Sir William Buckland in 1818. Works from 136 to 1884 provided some descriptions and labels of the locally-known beds, and the divisions of the Purbeck into upper, middle, and lower units. The label of Lulworth Beds was given to the strata below the Cinder Bed in 1963 by Casey, who called the remaining section the Durlston Beds. These were elevated to the status of Lulworth and Durlston Formations by Thompson in 1975, who introduced the Purbeck Group as their parent unit. Cope and colleagues considered the Purbeck as a formation in 1980, naming it the Purbeck Limestone Formation, while El Shahat and West in 1993 called it the Purbeck Formation. Ensom in 1985 and Clements in 1993 detailed the stratigraphy of the Worbarrow Tout and Durlston Bay sections respectively, with the former considering there to be 12 members in the Purbeck Limestone Formation, while the latter had an additional two members within the Lulworth and Durlston Formations of the Purbeck Limestone Group. The Members of Ensom and Clements were lowered to the status of Beds by Westhead and Mather in 1996 as they were of limited applicability outside of their originally-observed sections, with them only recognizing five members of the Lulworth and Durlston Formations, each encompassing multiple Beds of earlier studies.

The British Geological Survey recognises three formations and five members of the Purbeck Group, exposed differently across the span of southern England. In the Wessex Basin (or Vectian Basin) area of Dorset where the Purbeck was first recognized, the younger Durlston Formation can be divided into the Peveril Point Member and Stair Hole Member, while the older Lulworth Formation is divided into the Worbarrow Tout Member, Ridgeway Member, and Mupe Member. Within the Weald Basin, the Lulworth and Durlston Formations can be recognized, but their subdivisions are undifferentiated, while outside the Dorset region the oldest and lowermost Purbeck Limestone below the Lulworth in Wiltshire, Oxfordshire and Buckinghamshire has been given its own status as the Haddenham Formation.

In East Sussex the Purbeck Group is formally subdivided into the Blues and Greys Limestones members The sequence was traditionally divided into three, though along different lines viz. Upper, Middle and Lower. The Upper Purbeck comprises 50 to 60 ft (15 to 18 m). of fresh-water clays and shales with limestones, the Purbeck marble and Unio-bed, in the lower part. The Middle division (50 ft (15 m)), mainly thin limestones with shaly partings, contains the principal building stones of the Swanage district; near the base of this subdivision there is a 5 in (13 cm), bed from which an interesting suite of mammalian remains has been obtained; in this portion of the Purbeck Group there are some marine bands. The Lower Purbeck consists of fresh-water and terrestrial deposits, marls, and limestones (the famous Portland limestone) with several fossil soils known as dirt beds. This division is very extensively exposed on the Isle of Portland, where many of the individual beds are known by distinctive names. The chief building stones of Upwey belong to this part of the Purbeck Group.

Subdivisions of the Purbeck Group in Dorset
Purbeck Group	Durlston Formation	Peveril Point Member	"Upper Purbeck"	Upper "Cypris" Clays and Shales Bed
Purbeck Group	Durlston Formation	Peveril Point Member	"Upper Purbeck"	Unio Bed
Purbeck Group	Durlston Formation	Peveril Point Member	"Upper Purbeck"	Broken Shell Limestone Bed
Purbeck Group	Durlston Formation	Stair Hole Member	"Middle Purbeck"	Chief Beef Bed
Purbeck Group	Durlston Formation	Stair Hole Member	"Middle Purbeck"	Corbula Bed
Purbeck Group	Durlston Formation	Stair Hole Member	"Middle Purbeck"	Scallop Bed
Purbeck Group	Durlston Formation	Stair Hole Member	"Middle Purbeck"	Intermarine Bed
Purbeck Group	Durlston Formation	Stair Hole Member	"Middle Purbeck"	Cinder Bed
Purbeck Group	Lulworth Formation	Worbarrow Tout Member	"Middle Purbeck"	Cherty Freshwater Bed
Purbeck Group	Lulworth Formation	Worbarrow Tout Member	"Middle Purbeck"	Marly Freshwater Bed
Purbeck Group	Lulworth Formation	Worbarrow Tout Member	"Lower Purbeck"	Soft Cockle Bed
Purbeck Group	Lulworth Formation	Worbarrow Tout Member	"Lower Purbeck"	Hard Cockle Bed
Purbeck Group	Lulworth Formation	Ridgeway Member	"Lower Purbeck"	"Cypris" Freestones Bed
Purbeck Group	Lulworth Formation	Mupe Member	"Lower Purbeck"	Broken Beds and basal beds

=== Correlations ===
In the past, many geologists have ranged the Purbeck Group with the overlying Lower Cretaceous Wealden Group on account of the similarity of its fresh-water faunas; but the marine fossils, including the fishes, ally the Purbeck more closely with the Upper Jurassic rocks of other parts, and it may be regarded as the equivalent of the upper Volgian of Russia. Contemporaneous rocks are also present in the neighbourhood of Boulogne-sur-Mer, where they are characterized by thin limestones with Cyrena and gypsiferous marls. These French outcrops occur, just like those in England, in the core of the Weald-Artois anticline. Purbeckian aged deposits occur even further south in the Charente. In north-west Germany three subdivisions are recognized in strata of the same age: in descending order Purbeck Kalk, Serpulit and Münder Mergel.

The Jurassic-Cretaceous boundary is currently thought to be around the base of the "Cypris" Freestones Bed.

== Lithology ==
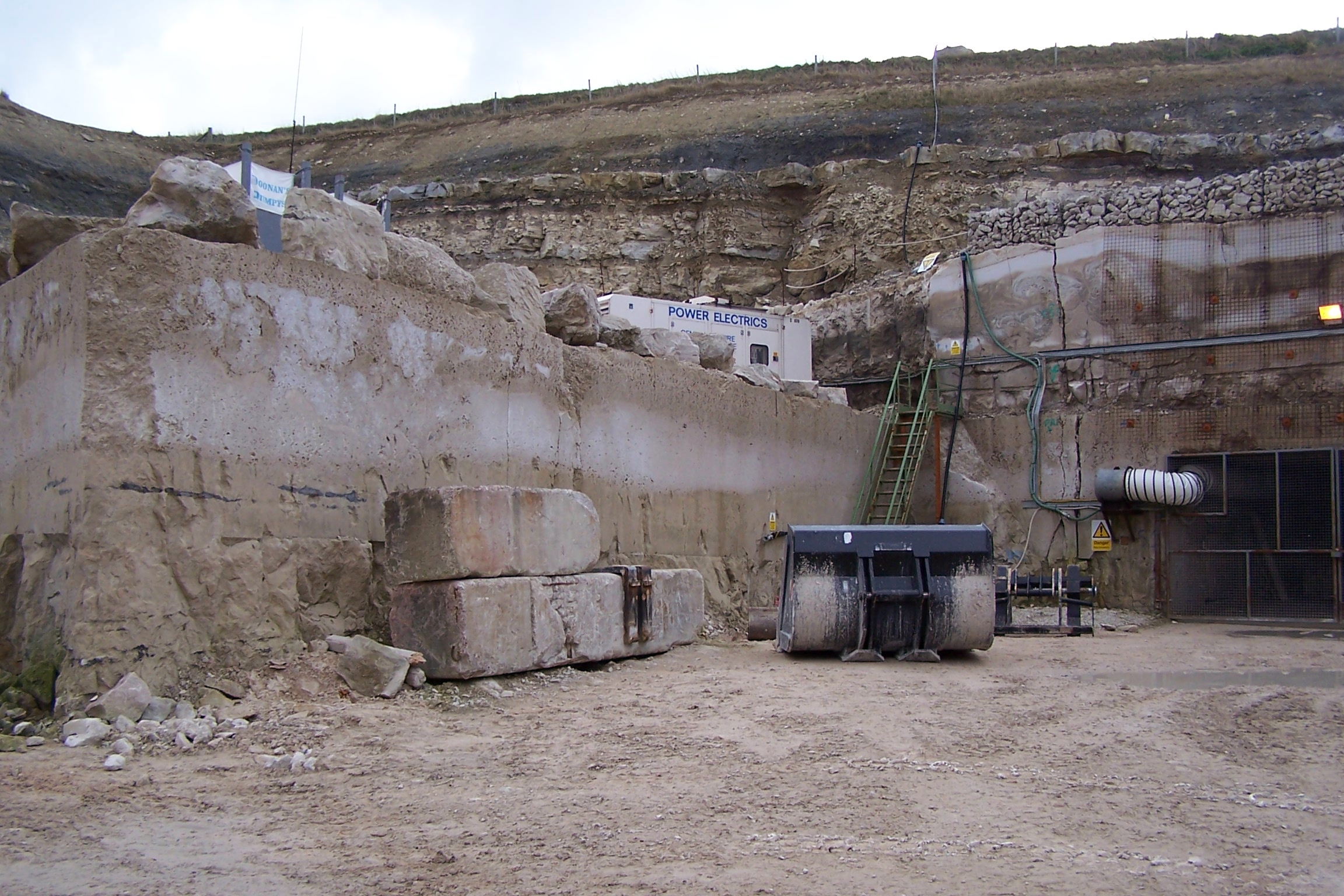
Purbeck quarry in southern England

The Purbeck Group outcrops follow the line of the Jurassic outcrop from Dorset, through the Vale of Wardour, Swindon, Garsington, Brill and Aylesbury. In East Sussex, the Purbeck Group outcrops at three locations north and northwest west of Battle, East Sussex and at Netherfield. They also occur at several other locations east of Heathfield, East Sussex and at Beak's Wood near Burwash. Deposits of evaporite minerals such as gypsum and anhydrite, within the Purbeck Group are mined and processed in Mountfield, East Sussex. In Lincolnshire they are represented in part by the Spilsby Sands and in Yorkshire by portions of the Speeton Clay.

The rocks predominantly comprise calcareous mudstones though also include clays, shales and marls with marly, tuffaceous and shelly limestones, occasional oolitic and sandy strata, and evaporites. Nodules of chert are present in some of the limestones.

The thickness of the formation in Wiltshire is 80 to 90 ft (27 m), but in Dorset it is typically between 45 and 120 metres (148 and 394 ft) thick. In the Weald of East Sussex the Purbeck Group has a typical thickness of between 77 and 186 metres (253 and 610 ft). In most places the Purbeck Group rests conformably upon the Portland Group and it is conformably overlaid by the Wealden Group; but there are in some districts distinct indications that the Portland Group was uplifted and worn away to some extent prior to the deposition of the Purbeck Group.

=== Use in construction ===
The building stones of the Purbeck Group have already been mentioned; the Purbeck or Paludina "marble", a grey or greenish limestone full of shells, was formerly extensively employed in cathedrals and churches. Stone tiles or slats were once used locally for roofing from the Lower Purbeck of Portland, Swanage and Swindon. Gypsum was formerly worked from the Lower Purbeck at Swanage.

== Palaeoenvironment and Paleobiota ==
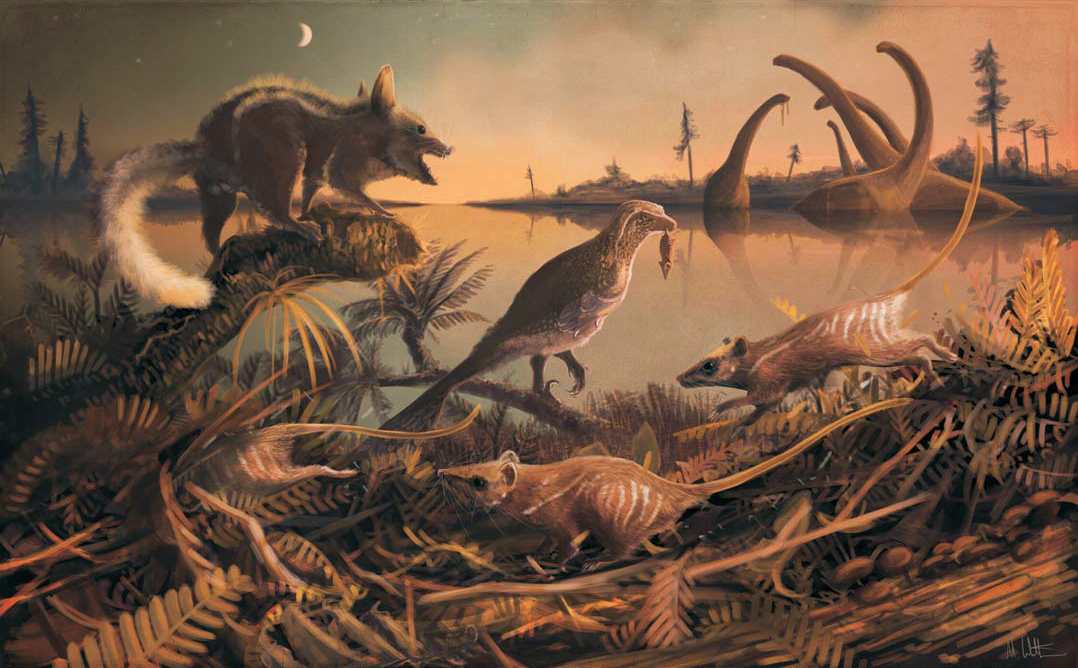
Animals by the Purbeck lagoon

=== Palaeobiota ===
The Purbeck beds are well known for their diverse biota, containing terrestrial, freshwater and marine elements, representing one of the world's most diverse earliest Cretaceous faunas. These were deposited in a semi-arid environment in conditions ranging from freshwater lakes, brackish water, and tidal flats to lagoons. Several important horizons within the assemblage, such as the "Mammal Bed", have yielded a large number of remains.

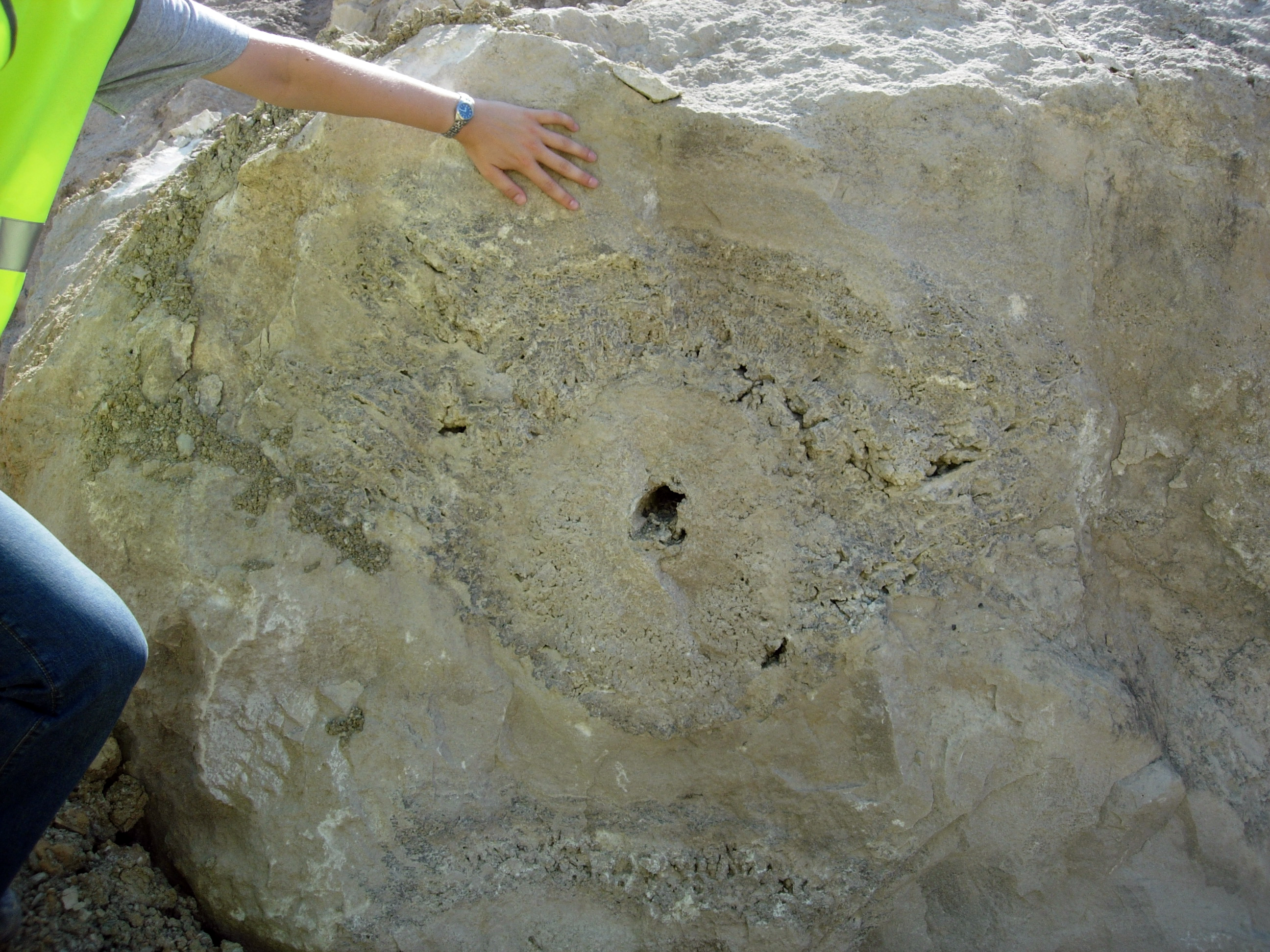
Thrombolites in the basal part of the Purbeck Group, Isle of Portland

=== Paleobiota list ===
Charophyte algae have been reported from the group.

==== Insects ====
Hundreds of insect species have been described from the Purbeck Group. A comprehensive account of Purbeck Group insects is given in Fossil Insects of the Purbeck Limestone Group of Southern England (2012).

==== Other Invertebrates ====
Invertebrates reported from the Purbeck Group
Genus	Species	Location	Stratigraphic position	Material	Notes	Images
Cypridea			Durlston Formation, Lulworth Formation		An ostracod belonging to the family Cyprididae	
Viviparus			Durlston Formation, Lulworth Formation		Gastropod	
Ptychostylus			Durlston Formation, Lulworth Formation		Gastropod	
Physa			Durlston Formation, Lulworth Formation		Gastropod	
Neomiodon			Durlston Formation		A euryhaline bivalve	
Praeexogyra	P. distorta		Durlston Formation		An oyster belonging to the family Gryphaeidae	
Hemicidaris	H. purbeckensis		Durlston Formation		A sea urchin	
Chlamys			Durlston Formation		A pectinid bivalve	
Corbula			Durlston Formation		A corbulid clam	
"Unio"			Durlston Formation		A freshwater bivalve	

==== Fish ====
Fish reported from the Purbeck Group
Genus	Species	Location	Stratigraphic position	Material	Notes	Images
Lonchidion	L. inflexum , L. crenulatum			Teeth	A hybodont shark	
Egertonodus	E. basanus			Teeth	A hybodont shark	
Polyacrodus	P. parvidens, P. rugianus			Teeth	A hybodont shark	
"Hybodus"	"H." ensis			Teeth	A hybodont shark	
Hybodontiformes				Fin spines		
Belemnobatis	B. variabilis			Teeth	A guitarfish-like ray	
Batoidea	Indeterminate			Teeth	Larger than Belemnobatis	
"Lepidotes"	"L." minor			Body fossils	A ginglymodian fish	
"Holophagus"	"H." purbeckensis			Body fossils	A coelacanth	
Macromesodon	M. daviesi			Body fossils	A pycnodont	
Eomesodon	E. depressus, E. barnesi			Body fossils	A pycnodont	
Proscinetes	P. (Microdon) radiatus			Body fossils	A pycnodont	
Ophiopsis	O. dorsalis			Body fossils	A halecomorph	
Amiopsis	A. damoni			Body fossils	An amiiform	
Histionotus	H. angularis			Body fossils	A semionotiform	
Pachythrissops	P. laevis			Body fossils	A possible ichthyodectiform	
Caturus	C. purbeckensis			Body fossils	An amiiform	
Thrissops	T. molossus			Body fossils	A ichthyodectiform	
Pleuropholis	P. crassicauda			Body fossils	A pleuropholid	
Pholidophoristion	P. ornatus			Body fossils	A teleost	
Aspidorhynchus	A. fischeri			Body fossils	An aspidorhynchiform	
Ichthyokentema	I. purbeckensis			Body fossils	A teleost	

==== Amphibians ====
Amphibians reported from the Purbeck Group
Genus	Species	Location	Stratigraphic position	Material	Notes	Images
Apricosiren	A. ensomi		Worbarrow Tout Member		Salamander	
Celtedens	C. megacephalus		Worbarrow Tout Member		Albanerpetontid	
Sunnybatrachus	S. purbeckensis		Worbarrow Tout Member		Frog, affinites to Discoglossidae	
?Batrachosauroididae	Indeterminate		Worbarrow Tout Member		Salamander	

==== Turtles ====
Turtles reported from the Purbeck Group
Genus	Species	Location	Stratigraphic position	Material	Notes	Images
Dorsetochelys	D. typocardium, D. delairi				Both species probably represent the same taxon	
Helochelydra	H. anglica					
Hylaeochelys	H. latiscutata					
Pleurosternon	P. bullocki					

==== Lepidosaurs ====
Lepidosaurs reported from the Purbeck Group
Genus	Species	Location	Stratigraphic position	Material	Notes	Images
Becklesius	Indeterminate					
Dorsetisaurus	D. hebetidens, D. purbeckensis				Anguimorph lizard	
Durotrigia	D. triconidens					
Homoeosaurus	Indeterminate				Rhynchocephalian	
Opisthias	Indeterminate				Rhynchocephalian	
Paramacellodus	P. oweni					
Parasaurillus	P. pseudobtusus					
Parviraptor	P. estesi				Stem-snake	
Pseudosaurillus	P. becklesi					
Purbicella	P. ragei					
Saurillus	S. robustidens					

==== Crocodyliformes ====
Crocodyliformes reported from the Purbeck Group
Genus	Species	Location	Stratigraphic position	Material	Notes	Images
cf. Bernissartia	Indeterminate			Teeth		
Goniopholis	G. crassidens, G. kiplingi, G. sp					
Pholidosaurus	P. purbeckensis		Intermarine Beds			
Nannosuchus	N. gracilidens					
Theriosuchus	T. pusillus					

==== Marine reptiles ====
Marine reptiles reported from the Purbeck Group
Genus	Species	Location	Stratigraphic position	Material	Notes	Images
Ophthalmosauridae	Indeterminate	Unknown	Unknown	Partial postcranial skeleton of a juvenile ichthyosaur (OUMNH J.13795)		
Cryptoclididae	Indeterminate	Unknown	Unknown	Various plesiosaur remains, including vertebrae and limb elements		

==== Pterosaurs ====
Pterosaurs reported from the Purbeck Group
Genus	Species	Location	Stratigraphic position	Material	Notes	Images
Gnathosaurus	G. macrurus			Lower jaw	Ctenochasmatid pterosaur	
Plataleorhynchus	P. streptophorodon			Partial skull	Ctenochasmatid pterosaur	
Ctenochasmatidae	Indeterminate				Cervical vertebrae	
Pterodactyloidea	Indeterminate				Teeth and limb bone remains	
Purbeckopus	P. pentadactylus				Trackways attributed to pterosaurs	

==== Dinosaurs ====
Dinosaurs reported from the Purbeck Group
Genus	Species	Location	Stratigraphic position	Material	Notes	Images
Echinodon	E. becklesii	Durlston Bay, Swanage		Teeth and dentary	A small heterodontosaurid	
Owenodon	O. hoggii	Durlston Bay, Swanage		Partial dentary	An iguanodontian	
Nuthetes	N. destructor	Feather Quarry, Durlston Bay, Swanage		Teeth, dentary fragment	Small dromaeosaur or tyrannosauroid	
Ornithischia	Indeterminate				Represented by footprints, probable eggshell fragments, a hadrosauriform femur, an ornithopod dorsal vertebral centrum, as well as a pedal phalanx, partial femur, and another indeterminate limb bone.	
Ankylosauria	Indeterminate				Represented by a tooth and a tail vertebra	
Theropoda	Indeterminate				Represented by footprints (some of which are attributed to Taupezia landeri), as well as teeth and isolated bones including a phalanx and metatarsal	
Sauropoda	Indeterminate				Represented by footprints, as well as teeth and a metacarpal bone and probable eggshells.	

==== Mammaliaforms ====
Mammaliaforms reported from the Purbeck Group
Genus	Species	Location	Stratigraphic position	Material	Notes	Images
Albionbaatar	A. denisae	Sunnydown Farm Quarry			Albionbaataridae	
Amblotherium	A. pusillum, A. soricinum, A. nanum	Mammal Bed			Dryolestid	
Bolodon	B. minor, B. crassidens, B. osborni, B. elongatus, B. falconeri	Mammal Bed			Plagiaulacidae	
Chunnelodon	C. alopekodes	Sunnydown Farm Quarry			Cladotherian	
Ctenacodon	C. minor	Mammal Bed			Allodontidae	
Dorsetodon	D. haysomi	Sunnydown Farm Quarry			Paurodontidae	
Durlstotherium	D. newmani	Mammal Bed			Possible eutherian	
Durlstodon	D. ensomi	Mammal Bed			Possible eutherian	
Gerhardodon	G. purbeckensis	Sunnydown Farm Quarry			Pinheirodontidae	
Kouriogenys	K. minor	Mammal Bed			Peramuridae	
Magnimus	M. ensomi	Sunnydown Farm Quarry			Cladotherian	
Peraiocynodon	P. inexpectatus	Mammal Bed			Docodontidae	
Peramuroides	P. tenuiscus	Mammal Bed			Peramuridae	
Peramus	P. tenuirostris, P. dubius, P. minor	Mammal Bed			Peramuridae	
Peraspalax	P. talpoides	Mammal Bed, Sunnydown Farm Quarry			Dryolestidae	
Phascolestes	P. mustelula	Mammal Bed, Sunnydown Farm Quarry			Dryolestidae	
Plagiaulax	P. becklesii	Mammal Bed			Plagiaulacidae	
Purbeckodon	P. batei	Sunnydown Farm Quarry			Morganucodonta	
Spalacotherium	S. tricuspidens, S. evansae, S. hookeri	Mammal Bed, Sunnydown Farm Quarry			Spalacotheriidae	
Sunnyodon	S. notleyi	Sunnydown Farm Quarry			Paulchoffatiidae	
Thereuodon	T. taraktes	Sunnydown Farm Quarry				
Tinodon	T. micron	Sunnydown Farm Quarry			Tinodontidae	
Triconodon	T. mordax	Mammal Bed, Sunnydown Farm Quarry				
Trioracodon	T. bisulcus, T. major, T. oweni	Mammal Bed, Feather Quarry				

== See also ==
- Geology of East Sussex
- List of dinosaur-bearing rock formations
