= Lulworth Formation =

Geological formation in England

- Stratigraphic range: Tithonian - Berriasian 152–139 Ma
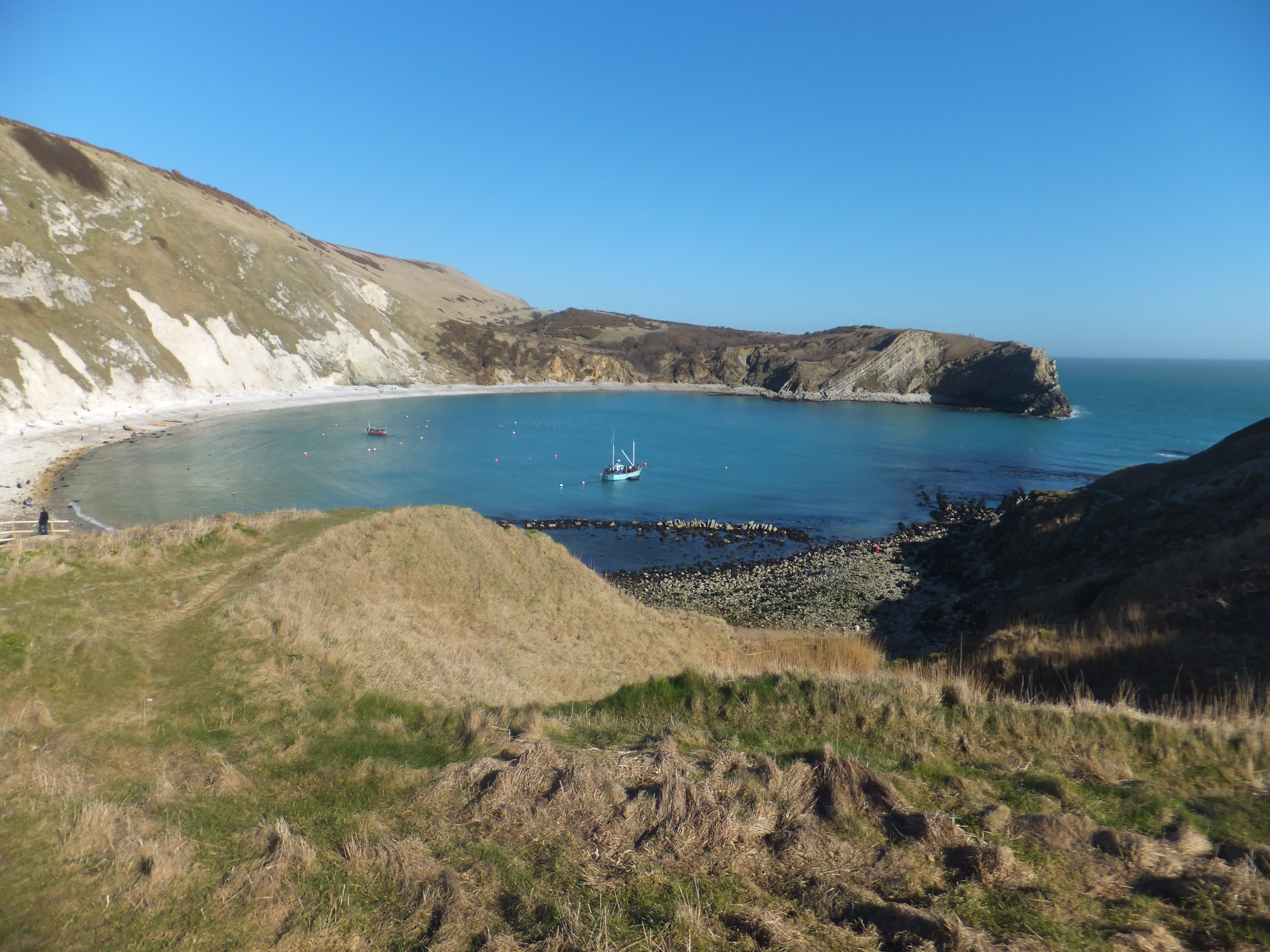
- Lulworth Cove, an area where the Lulworth Formation is exposed
- Type: Formation
- Unit of: Purbeck Group
- Sub-units: Worbarrow Tout Member; Ridgway Member; Mupe Member
- Underlies: Durlston Formation
- Overlies: Portland Stone Formation
- Thickness: In Dorset 27-63 metres, In Weald 86 m Vale of Wardour up to 15m

Lithology
- Primary: Calcarenite, Micrite, Mudstone, Marl
- Other: Gypsum

Location
- Region: England
- Country: United Kingdom

Type section
- Named for: Lulworth
- Location: West side of Worbarrow Tout

The Lulworth Formation is a geologic formation in England. It dates from the late Tithonian to the mid Berriasian. It is a subunit of the Purbeck Group. In Dorset, it consists of three members, which are in ascending order, the Mupe Member, the Ridgway Member, and the Warbarrow Tout Member. The Mupe Member is typically 11 to 16 m thick and largely consists of marls and micrites with interbeds of calcareous mudstone. The Ridgeway Member is about 3 to 7 m thick and consists of in its western portion carbonaceous muds, marls and micrites, in the east the muds are replaced by micritic limestone. The Warbarrow Tout Member is 17 to 39 m thick and consists of limestone at the base and micrite and mudstone for the rest of the sequence, this member is the primary source of the vertebrate fossils within the formation. Elsewhere the unit is undifferentiated.

== Vertebrate paleobiota ==
=== Amphibians ===
Amphibians reported from the Lulworth Formation
Genus	Species	Location	Stratigraphic position	Material	Notes	Images
Apricosiren	A. ensomi		Worbarrow Tout Member		Salamander	
Celtedens	C. megacephalus		Worbarrow Tout Member		Albanerpetontid	
Sunnybatrachus	S. purbeckensis		Worbarrow Tout Member		Frog, affinites to Discoglossidae	
?Batrachosauroididae	Indeterminate		Worbarrow Tout Member		Salamander	

=== Turtles ===
Turtles reported from the Lulworth Formation
Genus	Species	Location	Stratigraphic position	Material	Notes	Images
Dorsetochelys	D. typocardium, D. delairi				Both species probably represent the same taxon	
Helochelydra	H. anglica					
Hylaeochelys	H. latiscutata					
Pleurosternon	P. bullocki					

=== Lepidosaurs ===
Lepidosaurs reported from the Lulworth Formation
Genus	Species	Location	Stratigraphic position	Material	Notes	Images
Becklesius	Indeterminate					
Dorsetisaurus	D. hebetidens, D. purbeckensis					
Durotrigia	D. triconidens					
Homoeosaurus	Indeterminate				Rhynchocephalian	
Opisthias	Indeterminate				Rhynchocephalian	
Paramacellodus	P. oweni					
Parasaurillus	P. pseudobtusus					
Parviraptor	P. estesi				Stem-snake	
Pseudosaurillus	P. becklesi					
Purbicella	P. ragei					
Saurillus	S. robustidens					

=== Crocodyliformes ===
Crocodyliformes reported from the Lulworth Formation
Genus	Species	Location	Stratigraphic position	Material	Notes	Images
cf. Bernissartia	Indeterminate			Teeth		
Goniopholis	Indeterminate					
Nannosuchus	N. gracilidens					
Theriosuchus	T. pusillus					

=== Dinosaurs ===
Dinosaurs reported from the Lulworth Formation
Genus	Species	Location	Stratigraphic position	Material	Notes	Images
Echinodon	E. becklesii	Durlston Bay, Swanage		Teeth and dentary	A small heterodontosaurid	
Owenodon	O. hoggii	Durlston Bay, Swanage		Partial dentary	An iguanodontoid	
Nuthetes	N. destructor	Feather Quarry, Durlston Bay, Swanage		Teeth, dentary fragment	Small dromaeosaur	

=== Mammals ===
Mammals reported from the Lulworth Formation
Genus	Species	Location	Stratigraphic position	Material	Notes	Images
Albionbaatar	A. denisae	Sunnydown Farm Quarry			Albionbaataridae	
Amblotherium	A. pusillum, A. soricinum, A. nanum	Mammal Bed				
Bolodon	B. minor, B. crassidens, B. osborni, B. elongatus, B. falconeri	Mammal Bed			Plagiaulacidae	
Chunnelodon	C. alopekodes	Sunnydown Farm Quarry				
Ctenacodon	C. minor	Mammal Bed			Allodontidae	
Dorsetodon	D. haysomi	Sunnydown Farm Quarry			Paurodontidae	
Durlstotherium	D. newmani	Mammal Bed				
Durlstodon	D. ensomi	Mammal Bed				
Gerhardodon	G. purbeckensis	Sunnydown Farm Quarry			Pinheirodontidae	
Kouriogenys	K. minor	Mammal Bed			Peramuridae	
Magnimus	M. ensomi	Sunnydown Farm Quarry				
Peraiocynodon	P. inexpectatus	Mammal Bed			Docodontidae	
Peramuroides	P. tenuiscus	Mammal Bed			Peramuridae	
Peramus	P. tenuirostris, P. dubius, P. minor	Mammal Bed			Peramuridae	
Peraspalax	P. talpoides	Mammal Bed, Sunnydown Farm Quarry			Dryolestidae	
Phascolestes	P. mustelula	Mammal Bed, Sunnydown Farm Quarry			Dryolestidae	
Plagiaulax	P. becklesii	Mammal Bed			Plagiaulacidae	
Purbeckodon	P. batei	Sunnydown Farm Quarry			Morganucodonta	
Spalacotherium	S. tricuspidens, S. evansae, S. hookeri	Mammal Bed, Sunnydown Farm Quarry			Spalacotheriidae	
Sunnyodon	S. notleyi	Sunnydown Farm Quarry			Paulchoffatiidae	
Thereuodon	T. taraktes	Sunnydown Farm Quarry				
Tinodon	T. micron	Sunnydown Farm Quarry			Tinodontidae	
Triconodon	T. mordax	Mammal Bed, Sunnydown Farm Quarry				
Trioracodon	T. bisulcus, T. major, T. oweni	Mammal Bed, Feather Quarry				

== See also ==
- List of fossiliferous stratigraphic units in England
- List of dinosaur bearing rock formations
