= Koum Formation =

Geological formation in Cameroon

- Stratigraphic range: Aptian-Albian; ~125–100 Ma
- Type: Geological formation
- Sub-units: Mbissirri Member, Grés de Gaba Member

Lithology
- Primary: Sandstone
- Other: Claystone, siltstone, conglomerate

Location
- Coordinates: 8.3°N 14.5°E
- Approximate paleocoordinates: 8.1°S 5.0°E
- Region: Nord
- Country: Cameroon
- Extent: Koum Basin
- Koum Formation (Cameroon)

The Koum Formation is a geological formation in the North Province of Cameroon, western Africa.

Its strata date back to the Aptian and Albian stages of the Early Cretaceous. Dinosaur remains are among the fossils that have been recovered from the formation.

== Fossil content ==
The following fossils have been found in the formation:

Color key: Taxon / Reclassified taxon / Taxon falsely reported as present / Dubious taxon or junior synonym / Ichnotaxon / Ootaxon / Morphotaxon	Notes; Uncertain or tentative taxa are in small text; ~~crossed out~~ taxa are discredited.

=== Dinosaurs ===
==== Ornithischians ====
Ornithischians of the Koum Formation
Genus	Species	Location	Stratigraphic position	Material	Notes	Images
Ouranosaurus	O. nigeriensis				A sail-backed ouranosaurian styracosternan	
?Thyreophora Indet.	Indeterminate					

==== Sauropoda ====
Sauropods of the Koum Formation
Genus	Species	Location	Stratigraphic position	Material	Notes	Images
Sauropoda Indet.	Indeterminate					

==== Theropods ====
Theropods of the Koum Formation
Genus	Species	Location	Stratigraphic position	Material	Notes	Images
Baryonychinae Indet.	Indeterminate				A baryonychine spinosaurid	
Theropoda Indet.	Indeterminate					

=== Crocodylomorphs ===
Crocodylomorphs of the Koum Formation
Genus	Species	Location	Stratigraphic position	Material	Notes	Images
Araripesuchus	A. wegeneri				A uruguaysuchid notosuchian	
Brillanceausuchus	B. babouriensis				A paralligatorid crocodyliform	
Sebecosuchia Indet.	Indeterminate					

=== Mammals ===
Mammals of the Koum Formation
Genus	Species	Location	Stratigraphic position	Material	Notes	Images
Abelodon	A. abeli				A peramurid zatherian	

== See also ==
- List of dinosaur-bearing rock formations
