= Abelodon =

Abelodon Temporal range: Early Cretaceous

Scientific classification
- Kingdom: Animalia
- Phylum: Chordata
- Class: Mammalia
- Order: †Peramura
- Family: †Peramuridae
- Genus: †Abelodon; Brunet et al., 1989

Type species
- †Abelodon abeli Brunet et al., 1989

Species
- †Abelodon abeli Brunet et al., 1989

Extinct family of mammals

Abelodon is an extinct genus of peramurid mammal in the clade Zatheria, which lived during the Early Cretaceous. It is known from a single tooth found in Cameroon's Koum Formation.

== Paleoecology ==
Abelodon lived alongside various archosaurs in the Koum Formation, such as ornithopod dinosaurs like Ouranosaurus, theropods like an unnamed baryonychine, and crocodilians like Araripesuchus.
