= Eucorethrina =

Scientific classification
- Kingdom: Animalia
- Phylum: Arthropoda
- Class: Insecta
- Order: Diptera
- Family: Chaoboridae
- Genus: Eucorethrina; Kalugina, 1985

Genus of insects

Eucorethrina is a genus of flies belonging to the family Chaoboridae.

The species of this genus are found in Europe and Russia.

Species:

- Eucorethrina convexa Lukashevich, 1996
- Eucorethrina flexa Kalugina, 1985
