= Sunnybatrachus =

Sunnybatrachus Temporal range: Early Cretaceous, Berriasian

Scientific classification
- Kingdom: Animalia
- Phylum: Chordata
- Class: Amphibia
- Order: Anura
- Genus: †Sunnybatrachus; Evans & McGowan, 2002
- Species: †S. purbeckensis

Binomial name
- †Sunnybatrachus purbeckensis Evans & McGowan, 2002

Extinct genus of amphibians

Sunnybatrachus is a genus of extinct frog that lived during the Berriasian epoch of the Early Cretaceous of England. The only known material, including the holotype ilium as well as bones of the skull, vertebral column, forelimb, pelvis, and hindlimb was named Sunnybatrachus purbeckensis by Susan E. Evans and Gerard J. McGowan in 2002. The species name describes the Purbeck Limestone Group, while the genus name is for the Sunnydown Farm locality of the Lulworth Formation, where the fossils were found.

Sunnybatrachus purbeckensis is estimated to have a been mid-sized frog, measuring 40–80 mm (1.6–3.1 in) in snout–vent length.
