= Peramuroides =

Peramuroides Temporal range: Berriasian

Scientific classification
- Domain: Eukaryota
- Kingdom: Animalia
- Phylum: Chordata
- Class: Mammalia
- Order: †Peramura
- Family: †Peramuridae
- Genus: †Peramuroides; Davis, 2012
- Species: †P. tenuiscus

Binomial name
- †Peramuroides tenuiscus Davis, 2012

Extinct genus of mammals

Peramuroides is a genus of extinct mammal from the Early Cretaceous of southern England. The type and only species is Peramuroides tenuiscus, described in 2012 by Brian Davis for dentary fragments and teeth from the Berriasian Lulworth Formation. The genus name references closely related Peramus, while the species name is based on the Latin word for "thin". Peramuroides is closely related to coexisting genera Peramus and Kouriogenys, and along with other genera these make up the family Peramuridae, a group of extinct zatherians.
