= Saurillus =

Saurillus Temporal range: Tithonian–Berriasian

Scientific classification
- Kingdom: Animalia
- Phylum: Chordata
- Class: Reptilia
- Order: Squamata
- Family: †Paramacellodidae
- Genus: †Saurillus; Owen, 1854

Type species
- †Saurillus obtusus Owen, 1854

Extinct genus of lizards

Saurillus is an extinct genus of paramacellodid lizard from the Late Jurassic or Early Cretaceous of Europe. It was first named by British palaeontologist Richard Owen in 1854 for a lower jaw found in the Purbeck Group of the Isle of Purbeck, but its only definitive specimen is now lost. Tentative material from the Alcobaça Formation of Portugal, including teeth and a jaw, has also been assigned. Numerous additional specimens have been referred to Saurillus, but all of this material has been removed to Pseudosaurillus. General similarities led Richard Estes to consider Saurillus a member of the extinct lizard family Paramacellodidae.
