= Dorsetodon =

Dorsetodon Temporal range: Early Cretaceous Berriasian

Scientific classification
- Domain: Eukaryota
- Kingdom: Animalia
- Phylum: Chordata
- Class: Mammalia
- Order: †Dryolestida
- Family: †Paurodontidae
- Genus: †Dorsetodon; Ensom & Sigogneau-Russell, 1998
- Species: †D. haysomi

Binomial name
- †Dorsetodon haysomi Ensom & Sigogneau-Russell, 1998

Extinct family of mammals

Dorsetodon is an extinct genus of mammal from the Early Cretaceous (Berriasian) Purbeck Group of Britain. It is represented by isolated lower molars.

== See also ==
- Prehistoric mammal
  - List of prehistoric mammals
