= Magnimus =

Magnimus Temporal range: Berriasian

Scientific classification
- Domain: Eukaryota
- Kingdom: Animalia
- Phylum: Chordata
- Class: Mammalia
- Clade: Zatheria
- Genus: †Magnimus; Sigogneau-Russell, 1999
- Species: †M. ensomi

Binomial name
- †Magnimus ensomi Sigogneau-Russell, 1999

Extinct family of mammals

Magnimus is a genus of extinct mammal from the Early Cretaceous of Southern England. The type and only species is Magnimus ensomi, described in 1999 by Denise Sigogneau-Russell for molars from the Berriasian Lulworth Formation. The specific name was given to honour Paul Ensom, a discoverer of many teeth from the Purbeck beds, while the generic name is from the Latin words for "large" and "mouse". It is similar to but distinct from Peramus and Abelodon, but its classification cannot be narrowed down beyond indeterminate Zatheria due to its incomplete nature.
