= Apricosiren =

Apricosiren Temporal range: Berriasian, 145.5–140 Ma

Scientific classification
- Kingdom: Animalia
- Phylum: Chordata
- Class: Amphibia
- Clade: Caudata
- Genus: †Apricosiren; Evans & McGowan 2002

Type species
- †Apricosiren ensomi Evans & McGowan 2002

Extinct genus of salamanders

Apricosiren is an extinct genus of prehistoric salamander that lived during the Early Cretaceous period around 145.5-140 million years ago . It is known from the Berriasian aged Lulworth Formation in southern England. It was a small species.

The genus name combines Latin apricus (=sunny), in reference to the type locality, Sunnydown Farm, and siren, a salamander. The specific name ensomi honours Paul Ensom for his contributions to "our knowledge of Early Cretaceous microvertebrates".

== Phylogeny ==
Apricosiren belong to a large clade of amphibians known as Caudata and potentially an early diverging member of Salamandroidea. This genus is closely related to genera such as Kiyatriton and Valdotriton.

== See also ==
- Prehistoric amphibian
- List of prehistoric amphibians
