= Kouriogenys =

Kouriogenys Temporal range: Berriasian

Scientific classification
- Domain: Eukaryota
- Kingdom: Animalia
- Phylum: Chordata
- Class: Mammalia
- Order: †Peramura
- Family: †Peramuridae
- Genus: †Kouriogenys; Davis, 2012
- Species: †K. minor

Binomial name
- †Kouriogenys minor (Owen, 1871)

Synonyms
- Spalacotherium minus Owen, 1871

Extinct genus of mammals

Kouriogenys is a genus of extinct mammal from the Early Cretaceous of southern England. The type and only species was originally described as Spalacotherium minus by Richard Owen in 1871 for a dentary with teeth from the Berriasian Lulworth Formation, although it was given its own genus in 2012 by Brian Davis. The genus name is taken from the Ancient Greek "youthful" and "jaw" in reference to the replacement method of the premolars. Kouriogenys is closely related to coexisting genera Peramus and Peramuroides, and along with other genera these make up the family Peramuridae, a group of extinct zatherians.
