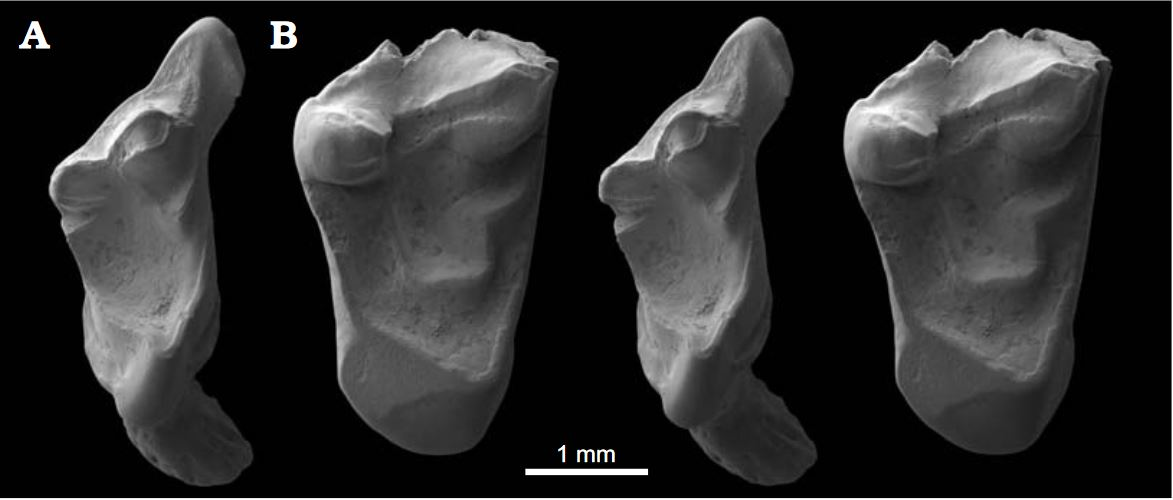
- Molars of Durlstotherium newmani (A) and Durlstodon ensomi (B)

Scientific classification
- Domain: Eukaryota
- Kingdom: Animalia
- Phylum: Chordata
- Class: Mammalia
- Clade: Eutheria
- Genus: †Durlstodon; Sweetman et al., 2017

Type species
- †Durlstodon ensomi Sweetman et al., 2017

= Durlstodon =

Durlstodon Temporal range: Berriasian

Extinct family of mammals

Durlstodon is a genus of extinct mammal from the Early Cretaceous of Southern England. It contains a single species, Durlstodon ensomi, which is known from molars found in the Berriasian Lulworth Formation of Durlston Bay, Dorset, after which the genus was named. The species name honours Paul Ensom, discoverer of many fossil mammals from Lulworth. Durlstodon and two of its contemporaries, Tribactonodon and Durlstotherium, had tribosphenidan (three-cusped) molars, which are an advanced characteristic among eutherian mammals and suggest that the group emerged earlier than the Early Cretaceous.

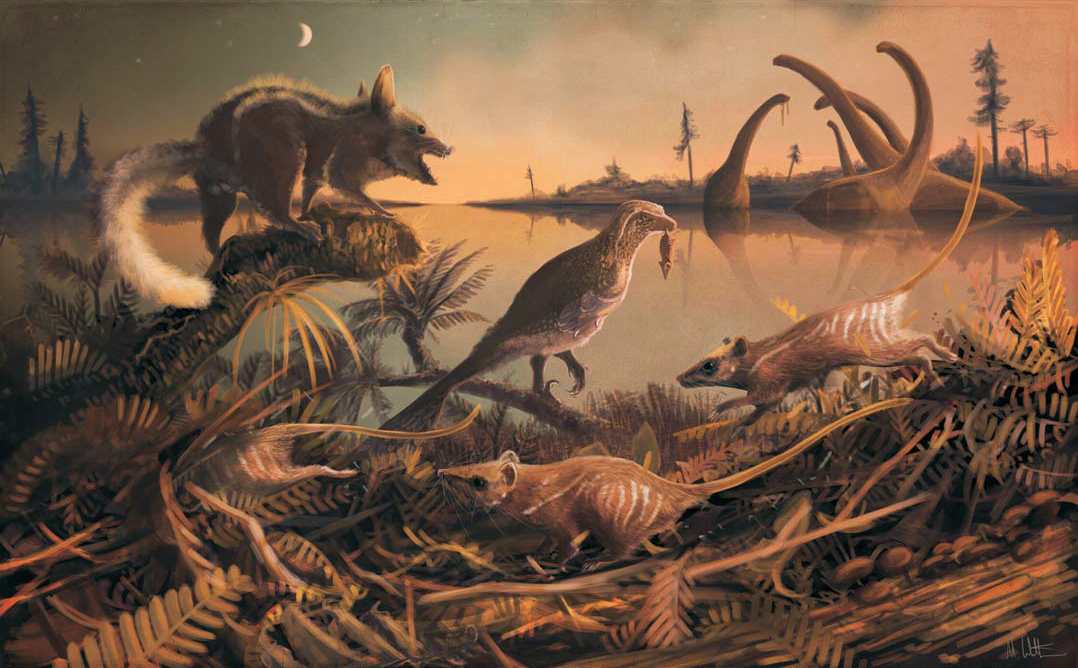
Artist's impression of Durlstotherium (right and center) and Durlstodon (left)
