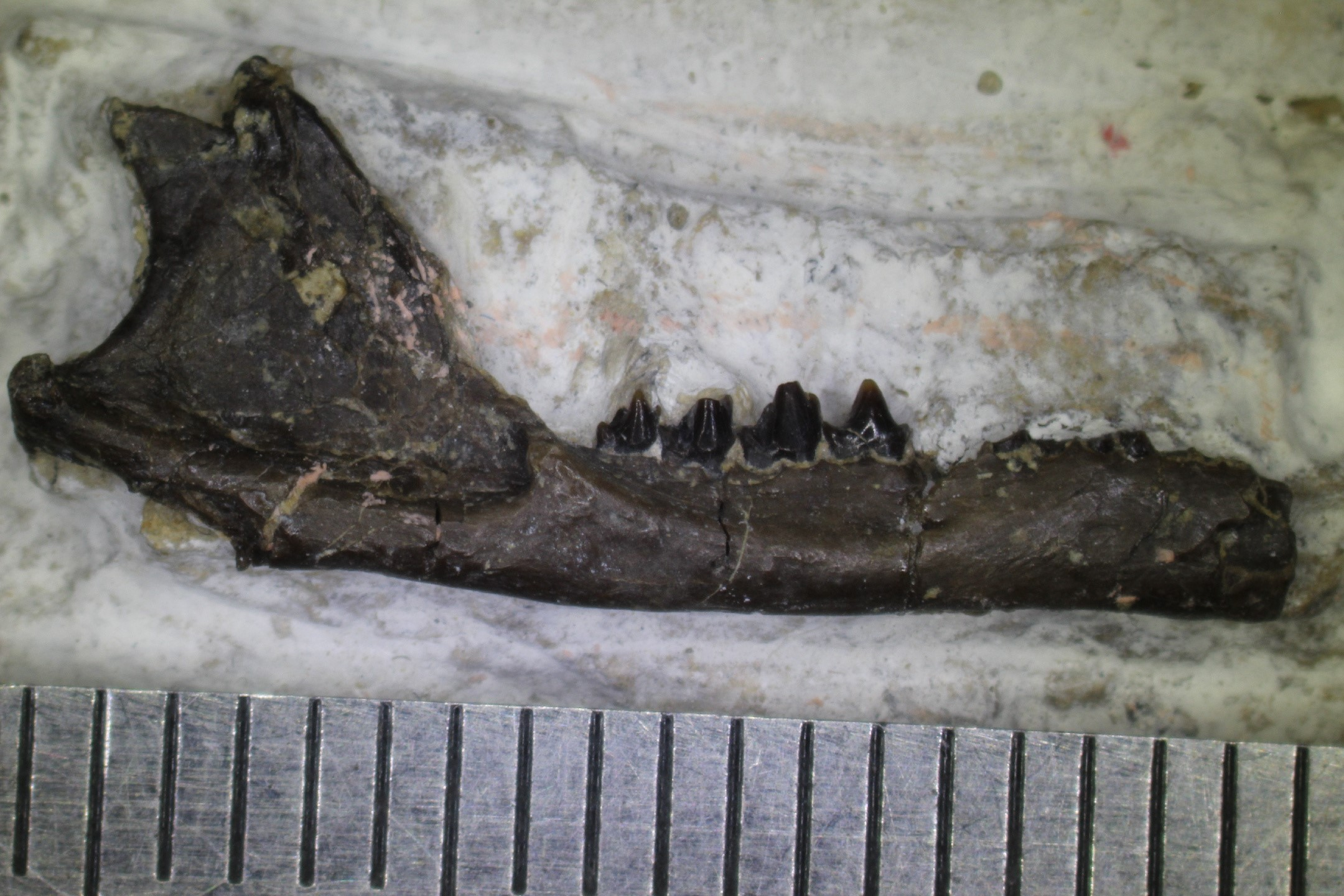
- Lower jaw of Peramus tenuirostris

Scientific classification
- Kingdom: Animalia
- Phylum: Chordata
- Class: Mammalia
- Clade: Prototribosphenida
- Clade: Zatheria
- Order: †Peramura; McKenna, 1975
- Family: †Peramuridae; Kretzoi, 1946

Genera
- Afriquiamus; Kiyatherium; Magnimus; Minimus; ?Tendagurutherium (possibly an australosphenidan instead); Peramus; Abelodon; Pocamus; Kouriogenys; Peramuroides

= Peramuridae =

Peramuridae Temporal range: Late Jurassic-Early Cretaceous

Extinct family of mammals

The family Peramuridae is a family of mammals that lived in the Late Jurassic and Early Cretaceous. They are considered to be advanced cladotherians, closely related to therian mammals as part of Zatheria.
