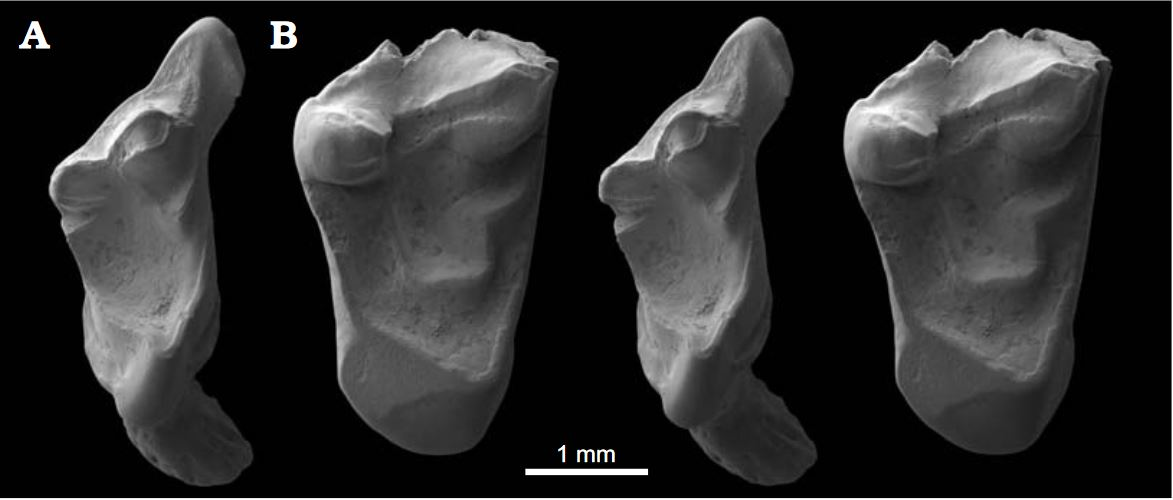
- Molars of Durlstotherium newmani (A) and Durlstodon ensomi (B)

Scientific classification
- Kingdom: Animalia
- Phylum: Chordata
- Class: Mammalia
- Clade: Eutheria
- Genus: †Durlstotherium; Sweetman et al., 2017

Type species
- †Durlstotherium newmani Sweetman et al., 2017

= Durlstotherium =

Durlstotherium Temporal range: Early-Late Berriasian 145–140.2 Ma

Genus of mammals

Durlstotherium is an extinct genus of mammal from the Early Cretaceous. It contains a single species, Durlstotherium newmani. The type specimen was found in Durlston Bay, Dorset, after which the genus was named. D. newmani was named after a British pub landlord, Charlie Newman. Durlstotherium and two of its contemporaries, Tribactonodon and Durlstodon, had tribosphenidan (three-cusped) molars, which are an advanced characteristic among eutherian mammals and suggest that the group emerged earlier than the Early Cretaceous.

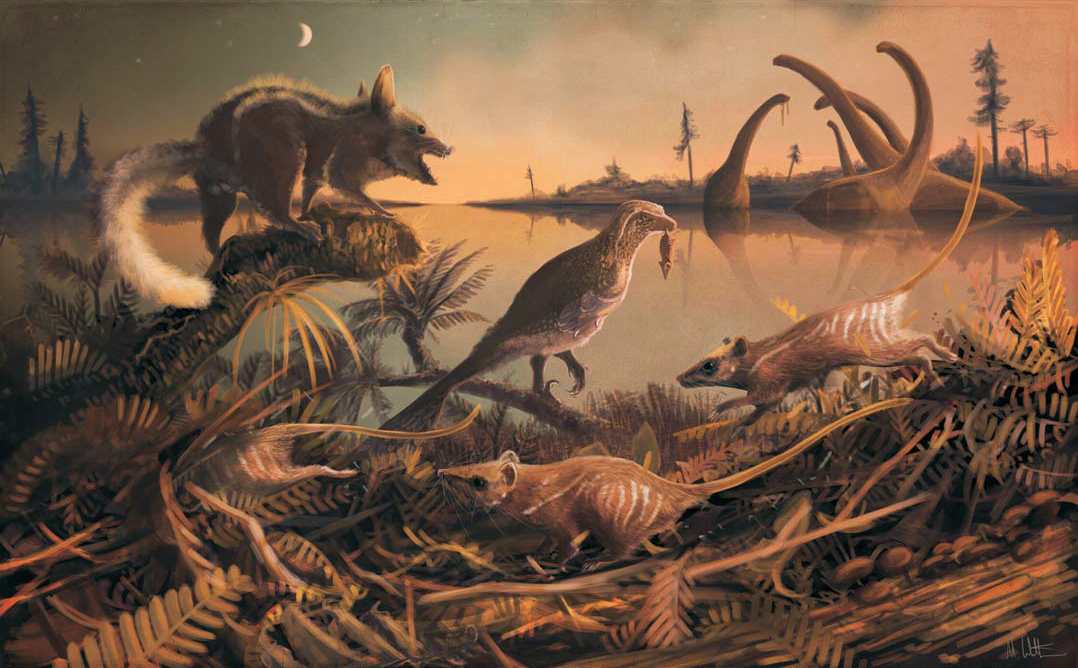
Artist's impression of Durlstotherium (right and center) and Durlstodon (left)
