= Paleobiota of the Morrison Formation =

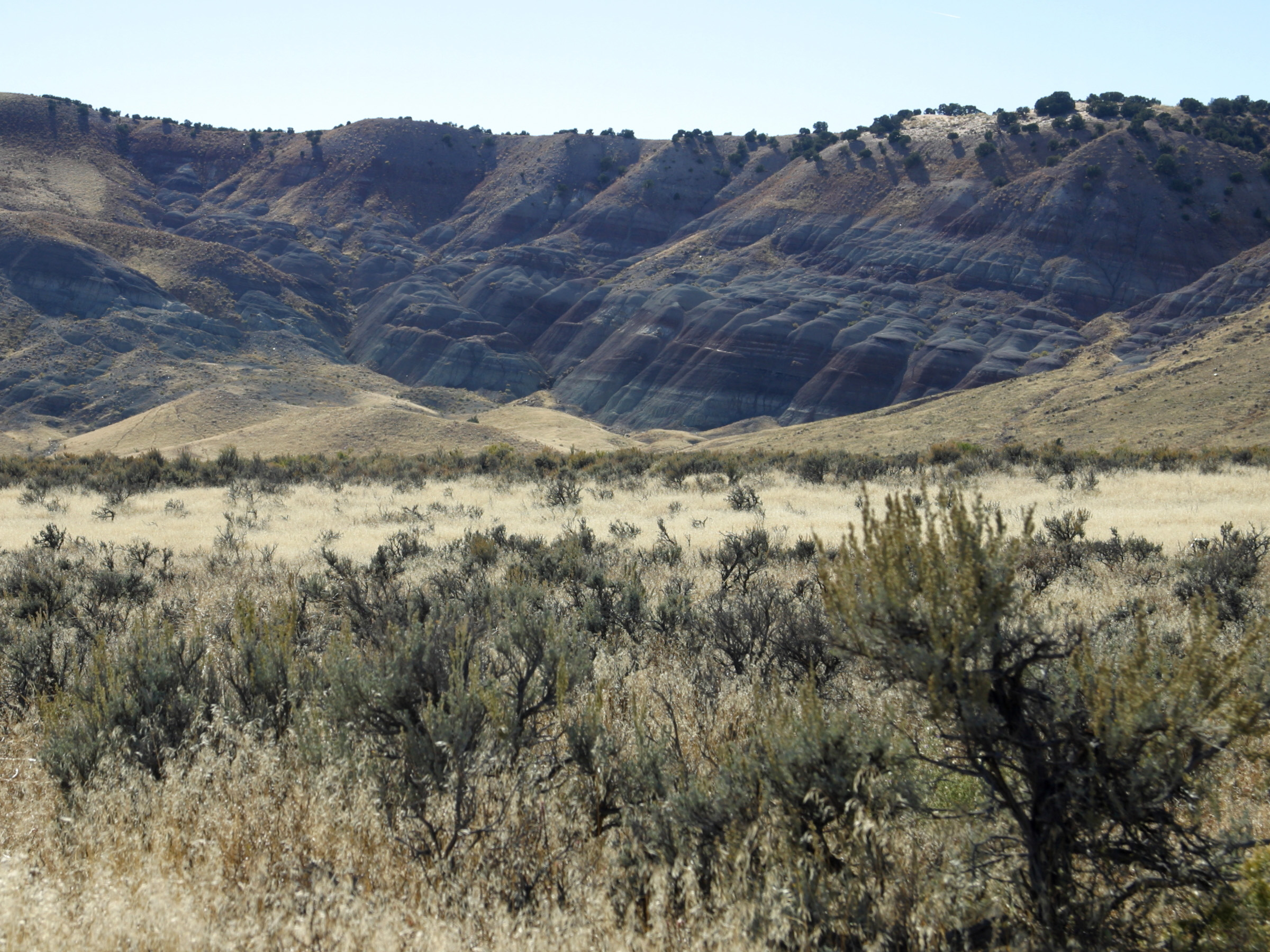
The distinctive banding of the Morrison Formation, a group of rock layers that occur throughout Dinosaur National Monument and the source of fossils like those found at the Dinosaur Quarry.

The Morrison Formation is a distinctive sequence of Late Jurassic sedimentary rock that is found in the western United States, which has a wide assortment of taxa represented in its fossil record, including dinosaur fossils in North America. It is composed of mudstone, sandstone, siltstone and limestone and is light grey, greenish gray, or red. Most of the fossils occur in the green siltstone beds and lower sandstones, relics of the rivers and floodplains of the Jurassic period.

== Plants ==
The Morrison Formation is devoid of flowering plants; during the Jurassic, the Earth was dominated by ferns, seed ferns, and a wealth of gymnosperms—such as cycads, ginkgos, and conifers. Vegetation varied from river-lining forests of conifers, tree ferns, and ferns (gallery forests), to fern savannas with occasional trees such as the Araucaria-like conifer Brachyphyllum.

Color key: Taxon / Reclassified taxon / Taxon falsely reported as present / Dubious taxon or junior synonym / Ichnotaxon / Ootaxon / Morphotaxon

Notes
Uncertain or tentative taxa are in small text
~~crossed out~~ taxa are discredited.

=== Conifers ===
Genus	Species	Locality	Material	Notes
Mesembrioxylon	M. carterii			
Protocupressinoxylon	P. medlynii			
Brachyphyllum	B. rechtenii B. sp			
Sequoia	S.sp			
Araucaria	Cf. A. sp A. delevoryasii			

=== Ginkgos ===
Genus	Species	Locality	Material	Notes
Ginkgo	G. sp			

=== Cycadophyta and relatives ===
Genus	Species	Locality	Material	Notes
Nilssonia	N. compta			
Zamites	Z. arcticus			
Cycadolepis	C. sp			

=== Gnetales ===
Genus	Species	Locality	Material	Notes
Bassitheca	B. hoodiorum	Colorado and Utah (Brushy Basin Member)	More than 300 specimens, three dimensional calcitic casts of a two-seeded compound cone	Tentatively assigned as a gnetale, with some attributes of the cones pointing towards a close relation with the extant genus Ephedra.
Dayvaultia	D. tetragona	Henry Mountains of Utah (Brushy Basin Member)	"Three-dimensional casts and partially permineralized small cones".	A gnetale with close affinities to Cretaceous and modern genera.

== Invertebrates ==
=== Arthropods ===
Trace fossils reported from the Morrison Formation are indicative of greater diversity of arthropods (especially insects) than recorded by body fossils. Bone modifications likely produced by dermestid beetles were reported in vertebrate fossils from Wyoming and Colorado.

Color key: Taxon / Reclassified taxon / Taxon falsely reported as present / Dubious taxon or junior synonym / Ichnotaxon / Ootaxon / Morphotaxon

Notes
Uncertain or tentative taxa are in small text
~~crossed out~~ taxa are discredited.

Name	Species	Locality	Material	Notes
Cambaridae	Indeterminate			A crayfish
Coleoptera	Indeterminate	Utah	Isolated elytra.	
Decapoda		Utah	A specimen preserved with structures similar to eyes on stalks, antennae and a cheliped.	Possibly a freshwater hermit crab.
Eopolis	E. ekdalei	Utah, Brushy Basin member	Nests produced by social insects, possibly termites.	
Morrisonnepa	M. jurassica	Utah		A Nepomorph hemipteran, family unknown
Parapleurites	P. morrisonensis	Colorado	a forewing.	A Locustopsid orthopteran
Spinicaudata		Utah	At least 10 specimens preserved as shells.	
Tektonargus	T. kollaspilus	Colorado, Brushy Basin member	Five specimens were reported in the original description of the ichnogenus.	

== Vertebrates ==
=== Fish ===
Although the paleoclimate of the Morrison formation was semiarid with only seasonal rainfall, there were enough bodies of water to support a diverse ichthyofauna. Although abundant, fish remains are constrained to only certain locations within the formation. Microvertebrate sites in Wyoming are dominated by fish remains. Indeterminate ray-finned fish remains have been recovered from Ninemile Hill and a microvertebrate site in the Black Hills. Found in stratigraphic zones 2, 4, and 5. Morrison actinopterygians generally have no close modern relatives. The Wyoming microvertebrate remains are extracted from the sediment by screenwashing. Paleoniscoid remains are geographically present in the western part of Colorado, where remains have been recovered from "a level above the Mygatt-Moore Quarry." Largely complete remains of small individuals have been consistently recovered for over 15 years. Single tooth fossil of pycnodont fish is represented from Dinosaur National Monument in Utah, found in stratigraphic zone 4. Dipnoan remains found at a fossil site not far from Cañon City, Colorado. Remains usually in a state of rather complete preservation. Halecostome remains are geographically present in the western part of Colorado, where remains have been recovered from "a level above the Mygatt-Moore Quarry." Largely complete remains of small individuals have been consistently recovered for over 15 years. Amiid remains found in stratigraphic zones 2, 3, and 4. Found at a fossil site not far from Cañon City, Colorado. Remains usually in a state of rather complete preservation.

Color key: Taxon / Reclassified taxon / Taxon falsely reported as present / Dubious taxon or junior synonym / Ichnotaxon / Ootaxon / Morphotaxon

Notes
Uncertain or tentative taxa are in small text
~~crossed out~~ taxa are discredited.

Name	Species	Locality	Material	Notes	Images
Ceratodus	C. fossanovum			A lungfish genus whose members ranged from 1 to 2 m in length and weights of up to 79 pounds, with most Morrison lungfish being on the smaller end of that range. These species are believed to have had similar diets to extant lungfish like the physically similar modern genus Neoceratodus.	Ceratodus "Hulettia" hawesi Morrolepis schaefferi A teleost, cf. Leptolepis
Ceratodus	C. ?frazieri			A lungfish genus whose members ranged from 1 to 2 m in length and weights of up to 79 pounds, with most Morrison lungfish being on the smaller end of that range. These species are believed to have had similar diets to extant lungfish like the physically similar modern genus Neoceratodus.	Ceratodus "Hulettia" hawesi Morrolepis schaefferi A teleost, cf. Leptolepis
Ceratodus	C. guentheri			A lungfish genus whose members ranged from 1 to 2 m in length and weights of up to 79 pounds, with most Morrison lungfish being on the smaller end of that range. These species are believed to have had similar diets to extant lungfish like the physically similar modern genus Neoceratodus.	Ceratodus "Hulettia" hawesi Morrolepis schaefferi A teleost, cf. Leptolepis
Ceratodus	C. robustus			A lungfish genus whose members ranged from 1 to 2 m in length and weights of up to 79 pounds, with most Morrison lungfish being on the smaller end of that range. These species are believed to have had similar diets to extant lungfish like the physically similar modern genus Neoceratodus.	Ceratodus "Hulettia" hawesi Morrolepis schaefferi A teleost, cf. Leptolepis
Ceratodus	Indeterminate.	Brushy Basin and Saltwash members		Represented by tooth plates.	Ceratodus "Hulettia" hawesi Morrolepis schaefferi A teleost, cf. Leptolepis
"Hulettia"	"H. hawesi"	Colorado		A small fish, originally considered as a member of Halecostomi about 7.6 cm in length and 5g of live mass which probably preferred quiet water. Its fossils prominently preserve its thick interlocking scales. Later study question its assignment to genus Hulettia, and suggested that it would be a semionotid instead.	Ceratodus "Hulettia" hawesi Morrolepis schaefferi A teleost, cf. Leptolepis
cf. Leptolepis	N/A	Colorado	Known only from a single nearly complete skeleton found at Rabbit Valley. Found in stratigraphic zone 5.	A 13 cm (5 inch) fish that was deeper bodied than its co-occurring contemporaries Morrolepis and "Hulettia". The Morrison cf. Leptolepis probably had a live mass of about 37g. It is the only teleost fish known from the formation and was morphologically more highly derived than other Morrison fish. It is believed to have fed on contemporary fish and small invertebrates.	Ceratodus "Hulettia" hawesi Morrolepis schaefferi A teleost, cf. Leptolepis
Morrolepis	M. schaefferi	Colorado		A coccolepidid "palaeoniscoid" with forward-set eyes positioned past the front end of the lower jaw. It had a tall dorsal fin set far back on the body and an asymmetrical caudal fin. Adult specimens would reach about 20 cm in length and 113 g (4 oz) in mass.	Ceratodus "Hulettia" hawesi Morrolepis schaefferi A teleost, cf. Leptolepis
Potamoceratodus	P. guentheri	Colorado		Once thought to be a species of Ceratodus.	Ceratodus "Hulettia" hawesi Morrolepis schaefferi A teleost, cf. Leptolepis
Purgotybaris	P. fosteri	Utah		A regurgitalite containing frog and salamander bones, probably produced by an amioid fish.	Ceratodus "Hulettia" hawesi Morrolepis schaefferi A teleost, cf. Leptolepis
A hybodont?	Indeterminate	Utah		Known from a dorsal spine.	

=== Amphibians ===
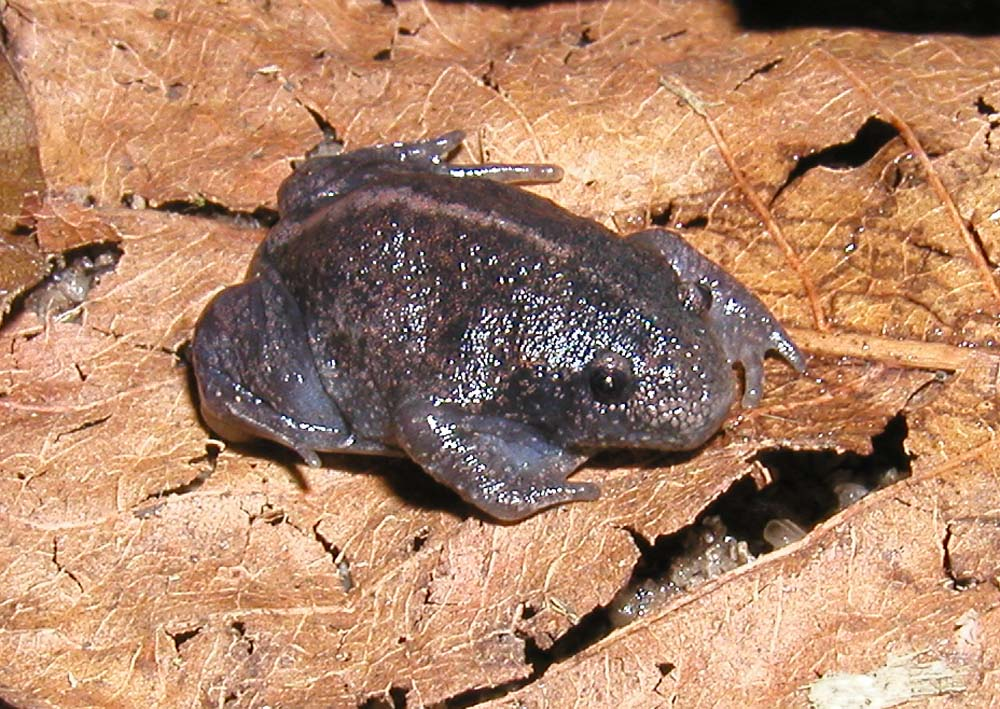
A modern frog from the same family as Rhadinosteus parvus, the rhinophrynidae.

Frogs are known from several sites in the Morrison Formation, but are not particularly well represented. The history of Morrison anuran discoveries began with the recovery of remains from Quarry 9 near Como Bluff, Wyoming. The new genus Eobatrachus was erected for some of these remains by O. C. Marsh, but the material was later considered non-diagnostic. Decades later another dubious anuran genus, Comobatrachus, was erected based on additional fragmentary remains. Despite the erection of multiple new names, only two frog species are currently recognised from the Morrison: Enneabatrachus hechti and Rhadinosteus parvus.

In addition to formally named taxa, indeterminate anuran remains have been recovered from Morrison strata in Colorado, Wyoming, and Utah, with the best specimens found in Dinosaur National Monument and Quarry 9. Stratigraphically speaking, indeterminate anurans have been found in stratigraphic zones 2 and 4. Indeterminate anurans with remains diagnostic down to the family level have also been reported from the Morrison, with pelobatids being represented by the ilium of an unnamed and indeterminate species, which was recovered from Quarry 9. Pelobatids are present in stratigraphic zones 5 and 6.

Indeterminate salamander remains are present in stratigraphic zones 2, 4, and 5. A distinctive type of salamander known only as Caudata B is present in stratigraphic zone 6.

Color key: Taxon / Reclassified taxon / Taxon falsely reported as present / Dubious taxon or junior synonym / Ichnotaxon / Ootaxon / Morphotaxon

Notes
Uncertain or tentative taxa are in small text
~~crossed out~~ taxa are discredited.

Name	Species	Locality	Material	Notes
Comobatrachus	C. aenigmaticus	Wyoming, Brushy Basin member	A partial right humerus.	A dubious genus of prehistoric frog erected by O. C. Marsh to house fragmentary remains recovered from Reed's Quarry 9 near Como Bluff Wyoming. Along with Eobatrachus it was among the earliest frog remains from the formation, although the two dubious genera were erected decades apart.
Comonecturoides	C. marshi	Wyoming, Brushy Basin member	Represented by a single femur.	Considered a nomen dubium because the name is based on non-distinctive remains which cannot be classified in detail.
Enneabatrachus	E. hechti	Utah and Wyoming		A small discoglossid frog whose live weight would have only been a few grams.
Eobatrachus	E. agilis	Wyoming, Brushy Basin member	A partial right humerus.	A dubious genus of prehistoric frog erected by O. C. Marsh to house fragmentary remains recovered from Reed's Quarry 9 near Como Bluff Wyoming. Along with Comobatrachus it was among the earliest frog remains from the formation, although the two dubious genera were erected decades apart.
Iridotriton	I. hechti	Utah, Brushy Basin	A partial skull and incomplete postcranial skeleton.	A basal salamandroid closely related to today's advanced salamanders.
Rhadinosteus	R. parvus	Utah	Known from several slabs of rock which contain multiple partial specimens in association.	A pipoid and possible rhinophrynid, Rhadinosteus parvus was only about 42 mm (1.6 inches) long in life.

=== Sphenodonts ===
Color key: Taxon / Reclassified taxon / Taxon falsely reported as present / Dubious taxon or junior synonym / Ichnotaxon / Ootaxon / Morphotaxon

Notes
Uncertain or tentative taxa are in small text
~~crossed out~~ taxa are discredited.

Name	Species	Locality	Material	Notes	Images
Eilenodon	E. robustus	Colorado	Several fragmentary skull, mandible, and tooth elements.	A herbivorous eilenodontine of relatively large size.	
Opisthias	O. rarus	Colorado, Utah and Wyoming, Brushy Basin member	Several skulls and partial skeletons.	An opisthodontian sphenodontian	
Opisthiamimus	O. gregori	Northern Wyoming, possibly west-central Colorado. Brushy Basin Member	Most of the skull and postcranium	A small-bodied eusphenodontian, and one of the most complete rhynchocephalian taxa yet known from North America.	
Theretairus	T. antiquus	Wyoming, Brushy Basin member	A mandible.	A small sphenodontian.	
Sphenodontia	Indeterminate	Dinosaur National Monument	A crushed partial skull (DINO 16454)	The specimen is undescribed. Although previously considered to have belonged to Opisthias or Theretairus, recent studies have doubted this referral, thus placing it as an indeterminate sphenodont.	

=== Squamates ===
Numerous squamate remains have been found in the sediments of the Morrison Formation, most commonly at sites in Utah, Colorado and Wyoming. A number of taxa have been described, coming from three different groups: anguimorph and scincomorph lizards and early snakes. The first squamates to be reported from the Morrison Formation were Paramacellodus and Dorsetisaurus, which were described from Wyoming's Quarry 9 by Don Prothero and Richard Estes. Later remains would include Diablophis, originally described as a species of Parviraptor by Susan Evans in 1996 but subsequently moved to the new genus Diablophis by Michael Caldwell et al. in 2015, with extra material also being reported from Utah's Cisco Mammal Quarry, and Schillerosaurus, originally described as "Schilleria" and reported from Dinosaur National Monument by Evans and Dan Chure in 1999. Two later additions to the Morrison's squamate assemblages are Eoscincus and Microteras, two scincomorph lizards found at Dinosaur National Monument and Como Bluff's Quarry 9, respectively. They were described by Chase Brownstein et al. in 2022. Indeterminate squamate remains have currently been described from Dinosaur National Monument.

The majority of modern-day scincomorph lizards are small insectivores that feed on a range of invertebrates. It is thought that their counterparts from the Morrison Formation would have occupied a similar niche due to their morphological similarities. Anguimorph lizards most likely hunted small vertebrates, and Diablophis is thought to have done so too. Prey items would have included the other squamates from the formation as well as its large diversity of small mammals. All squamates might have been prey for the larger predators of the Morrison Formation, including the abundant theropod dinosaurs and crocodilians.

Name	Species	Locality	Material	Notes
Diablophis	D. gilmorei	Fruita Palaeontological Area, Colorado and Cisco Mammal Quarry, Utah (Brushy Basin Member)	Broken skull material including a right maxilla, mandible and dentary. Broken axis vertebrae, precloacal vertebrae, one caudal vertebra and a possible sacral vertebra have also been found.	A basal snake. Originally described as a species of Parviraptor, it was subsequently moved to its own genus.
Dorsetisaurus	D. sp.	Quarry 9 at Como Bluff, Wyoming, Utah and Colorado (Brushy Basin Member)	Multiple dentaries.	An anguimorph lizard.
Eoscincus	E. ornatus	Site 412 at Dinosaur National Monument, Utah (Brushy Basin Member)	A partial skull including a complete rostrum and palate, a partial skull roof, and both mandibles.	A scincomorph lizard.
Helioscopos	H. dickersonae	Site 317 at Dinosaur National Monument, Utah (Brushy Basin Member)	A nearly complete skull consisting of a partial cranium and mandibles, lacking the anterior snout.	A stem-gecko.
Microteras	M. borealis	Quarry 9 at Como Bluff, Wyoming (Brushy Basin Member)	A partial skull consisting of an associated maxilla and braincase.	A scincomorph lizard.
Paramacellodus	P. sp.	Fruita Palaeontological Area & Rainbow Park, Colorado and Quarry 9 at Como Bluff, Wyoming (Brushy Basin Member)	Numerous specimens including jaws, skulls, osteoscutes, trunk vertebrae and hindlimbs. Possibly a left prefrontal and postcranial material consisting of a scapulocoracoid, trunk vertebra and multiple articulated bones consisting of a partial pelvis, seven caudal vertebrae and a nearly complete left hind limb.	A small scincomorph lizard with blunt teeth.
Saurillodon	S. sp	Fruita Palaeontological Area, Colorado (Brushy Basin Member)		A scincomorph lizard whose remains have been found in Middle Jurassic strata in England and Scotland as well as Late Jurassic strata in Portugal in addition to the Morrison formation remains.
Schillerosaurus	S. utahensis	Dinosaur National Monument, Utah (Brushy Basin Member)	Part and counterpart of a partial dissociated skeleton and a few limb bone fragments.	A small scincomorph lizard of otherwise uncertain evolutionary affinities.
Squamata	Indeterminate	Dinosaur National Monument, Utah (Brushy Basin Member)	Multiple specimens including fragmentary and disarticulated skeletons.	Squamates of uncertain affinities. Noted as distinct from Paramacellodus and Dorsetisaurus, of which remains have been found in the same quarry.

=== Turtles ===
Turtles (Testudines) are very common fossils in the Morrison, due to their bony shells. The most common were Glyptops plicatus (very common) and Dinochelys whitei (also common, but not as common as Glyptops). Also present were Dorsetochelys buzzops and Uluops uluops.

Color key: Taxon / Reclassified taxon / Taxon falsely reported as present / Dubious taxon or junior synonym / Ichnotaxon / Ootaxon / Morphotaxon

Notes
Uncertain or tentative taxa are in small text
~~crossed out~~ taxa are discredited.

Name	Species	Locality	Material	Notes
Chelonipus		Colorado and Utah, Salt Wash member		
Compsemys	C. plicatulus	Colorado		
Dinochelys	D. whitei	Colorado, Utah and Wyoming, Brushy Basin member	Several shells and some postcranial material.	
Dorsetochelys	D. buzzops			
Glyptops	G. plicatulus	Colorado and Wyoming, Brushy Basin member	Several shells, skulls, and partial skeletons.	
Glyptops	G. ornatus	Wyoming, Brushy Basin member	A skull.	Synonym of Glyptops plicatulus.
Glyptops	G. utahensis	Utah, Brushy Basin member	A complete shell.	Synonym of Glyptops plicatulus.
Uluops	U. uluops	Wyoming, Brushy Basin member	A cranium.	Most basal Pleurosternid from the Morrison Formation.

=== Choristoderes ===
Color key: Taxon / Reclassified taxon / Taxon falsely reported as present / Dubious taxon or junior synonym / Ichnotaxon / Ootaxon / Morphotaxon

Notes
Uncertain or tentative taxa are in small text
~~crossed out~~ taxa are discredited.

Name	Species	Locality	Material	Notes
Cteniogenys	C. antiquus	Colorado, Oklahoma, South Dakota, Utah and Wyoming		A choristoderan about 25 to 50 cm in length.
Meilynodraco	M. amonamarthi	Meilyn Quarry, Wyoming	WDC-DMQ-288, a mostly articulated skeleton with the vertebral column, pelvic girdle, disarticulated hind limb elements and scattered skull remains.	One of the basalmost choristoderans. About 45 cm in total length.

=== Crurotarsans ===
Crocodiles of a variety of sizes and habitats were common Morrison animals. Cursorial mesosuchians, or small terrestrial running crocs, included Hallopus victor and Fruitachampsa callisoni. More derived crocodilians included Diplosaurus ferox, Amphicotylus, Hoplosuchus kayi, and Macelognathus vagans.

Color key: Taxon / Reclassified taxon / Taxon falsely reported as present / Dubious taxon or junior synonym / Ichnotaxon / Ootaxon / Morphotaxon

Notes
Uncertain or tentative taxa are in small text
~~crossed out~~ taxa are discredited.

Name	Species	Locality	Material	Notes	Images
Amphicotylus	A. gilmorei	Wyoming			Hallopus Hoplosuchus
Amphicotylus	A. lucasii	Colorado			Hallopus Hoplosuchus
Amphicotylus	A. milesi	Wyoming, Brushy Basin member	A nearly complete skeleton.		Hallopus Hoplosuchus
Amphicotylus	A. stovalli	Oklahoma			Hallopus Hoplosuchus
Diplosaurus	D. felix	Colorado			Hallopus Hoplosuchus
Eutretauranosuchus	E. delfsi	Colorado and Wyoming			Hallopus Hoplosuchus
Fruitachampsa	F. callisoni	Colorado, Brushy Basin and Saltwash members			Hallopus Hoplosuchus
Hallopus	H. victor	Colorado, Brushy Basin member	A partial skeleton including a fragmentary skull roof.		Hallopus Hoplosuchus
Hatcherichnus	H. sanjuanensis	Colorado and Utah			Hallopus Hoplosuchus
Hatcherichnus	H. sp.	Utah and Wyoming, Salt Wash member			Hallopus Hoplosuchus
Hoplosuchus	H. kayi	Arizona and Utah			Hallopus Hoplosuchus
Macelognathus	M. vagans	Colorado and Wyoming, Brushy Basin member	A partial left mandible (type) and several fragmentary referred fossils.		Hallopus Hoplosuchus
Theriosuchus	T. morrisonensis	Wyoming	A nearly complete left mandible missing teeth.		Hallopus Hoplosuchus

=== Pterosaurs ===
Pterosaurs are very uncommon fossils in the Morrison, because the fragility of their thin walled bones often prevented their remains from being preserved. Despite being uncommon they are geographically widespread; indeterminate pterosaur remains have been found in stratigraphic zones 2 and 4-6. In addition to indeterminate remains, several species have been identified from both the rhamphorhynchoids (long-tailed pterosaurs) and pterodactyloids (short-tailed pterosaurs). Since the 1970s and 80s, pterosaur finds have become more common, but are still rare. Most Morrison pterosaurs have been found in marine and shoreline deposits. Pterosaur tracks have been found in both the Tidwell and Saltwash members. Morrison pterosaurs probably lived on fish, insects and scavenged dinosaur carcasses, or even foraged for prey, and actively hunted; they are fairly ecologically diverse, ranging from small hawking insectivore Mesadactylus to the raptorial Harpactognathus. While relatively few pterosaur genera are named from the Morrison Formation, fragmentary material that is not referrable to the genus level suggests the presence of dsungaripteroids, ctenochasmatids, dimorphodontids, and more tentatively wukongopterids and pteranodontians.

Color key: Taxon / Reclassified taxon / Taxon falsely reported as present / Dubious taxon or junior synonym / Ichnotaxon / Ootaxon / Morphotaxon

Notes
Uncertain or tentative taxa are in small text
~~crossed out~~ taxa are discredited.

Name	Species	Locality	Material	Notes	Images
Comodactylus	C. ostromi	Wyoming, Brushy Basin member	A metacarpal.	Nomen dubium	
Dermodactylus	D. montanus	Wyoming, Brushy Basin member	A metacarpal.	Nomen dubium	
Harpactognathus	H. gentryii	Wyoming, Brushy Basin member	A partial snout.	A large rhamphorhynchid with a wingspan of about 2.5 m and live mass of about 1.5 kg (3.3 lbs). Harpactognathus was related to the Solnhofen genus Scaphognathus.	
Kepodactylus	K. insperatus	Colorado, Brushy Basin member	A partial postcranial skeleton.	A large pterodactyloid with a 2.5 m (8 foot) wingspan and a live weight of about 1.5 kg (3 lbs). Kepodactylus may be related to the Asian dsungaripteroid pterosaurs.	
Laopteryx	L. priscus	Wyoming, Brushy Basin member	A braincase.	Nomen dubium initially misidentified as a bird.	
Mesadactylus	M. ornithosphyos	Colorado, Brushy Basin member	A synsacrum.	Several specimens have been incorrectly referred to Mesadactylus.	
Pteraichnus	P. saltwashensis*	Arizona and Oklahoma, Saltwash member			
Utahdactylus	U. kateae	Utah, Tidwell member	A fragmentary skeleton.	Previously thought to be an indeterminite diapsid, newer material suggests an affinity with ctenochasmatids.	

=== Mammaliaforms ===
Many types of mammaliaform cynodonts, mostly early mammals, are known from the Morrison; almost all of them were small sized animals, though occupying a very large variety of ecological niches, from the more rodent-like multituberculates to the carnivorous eutriconodonts (including the possibly volant Triconolestes) to the anteater-like Fruitafossor. Unclassified types include the digger Fruitafossor windscheffelia. Docodonts included the common genus Docodon, represented by D. victor, D. striatus, and D. superbus, and Peraiocynodon sp. Multituberculates, a common type of early mammal, were represented by Ctenacodon serratus, C. laticeps, C. scindens, Glirodon grandis, Morrisonodon brentbaatar, Psalodon fortis, ?P. marshi, P. potens, and Zofiabaatar pulcher. Triconodonts present included Amphidon superstes, Aploconodon comoensis, Comodon gidleyi, Priacodon ferox, P. fruitaensis, P. gradaevus, P. lulli, P. robustus, Triconolestes curvicuspis, and Trioracodon bisulcus.

Tinodontids were represented by Eurylambia aequicrurius (probably Tinodon), and Tinodon bellus (including T. lepidus). Finally, two families of Dryolestoidea were present: Paurodontidae, including Comotherium richi, Euthlastus cordiformis, Paurodon valens, and Tathiodon agilis; and Dryolestidae, including Amblotherium gracilis, Dryolestes obtusus (common genus), D. priscus, D. vorax, Laolestes eminens, L. grandis, and Miccylotyrans minimus.

In 2009, a study by J. R. Foster was published which estimated the body masses of mammals from the Morrison Formation by using the ratio of dentary length to body mass of modern marsupials as a reference. Foster concludes that Docodon was the most massive mammaliaform genus of the formation at 141g and Fruitafossor was the least massive at 6g. The average Morrison mammal had a mass of 48.5g. A graph of the body mass distribution of Morrison mammal genera produced a right-skewed curve, meaning that there were more low-mass genera.

Color key: Taxon / Reclassified taxon / Taxon falsely reported as present / Dubious taxon or junior synonym / Ichnotaxon / Ootaxon / Morphotaxon

Notes
Uncertain or tentative taxa are in small text
~~crossed out~~ taxa are discredited.

==== Tinodontids ====
Name	Species	Locality	Material	Notes
Eurylambia	E. aequicrurius	Wyoming		A tinodontid similar in appearance to Tinodon.
Tinodon	T. bellus	Wyoming		Tinodontids.
Tinodon	T. lepidus	Wyoming		Tinodontids.

==== Eutriconodonts ====
Name	Species	Locality	Material	Notes
Amphidon	A. superstes	Wyoming		A small amphidontid.
Aploconodon	A. comoensis	Wyoming		An amphilestid eutriconodont.
Comodon	C. gidleyi	Wyoming, Brushy Basin member	A mandible.	An amphilestid eutriconodont slightly larger in size than Aploconodon.
Phascalodon	P. gidleyi	Wyoming		
Triconolestes	T. curvicuspis	Utah		A volaticotherian eutriconodont.
Trioracodon	T. bisulcus	Wyoming		A triconodontid eutriconodont similar to Priacodon.

==== Multituberculates ====
Name	Species	Locality	Material	Notes
Ctenacodon	C. laticeps	Wyoming		
Ctenacodon	C. scindens			
Ctenacodon	C. serratus	Wyoming		
Glirodon	G. grandis	Colorado and Utah		
Morrisonodon	M. brentbaatar	Wyoming		
Priacodon	P. ferox	Wyoming		
Priacodon	P. fruitaensis	Colorado		
Priacodon	P. grandaevus	Wyoming		
Priacodon	P. lulli	Wyoming		
Priacodon	P. robustus	Wyoming		
Psalodon	P. fortis			
Psalodon	P. marshi			
Psalodon	P. potens			
Zofiabaatar	Z. pulcher	Wyoming		

==== Others ====
Name	Species	Locality	Material	Notes	Images
Cifellilestes	C. ciscoensis	Utah, Brushy Basin Member			Fruitafossor
Docodon	D. victor				Fruitafossor
Fruitafossor	F. windscheffeli	Colorado			Fruitafossor

==== Dryolestoids ====
Name	Species	Locality	Material	Notes
Amblotherium	A. gracilis	Colorado		A small Dryolestid dryolestoid.
Amblotherium	A. megistodon	Wyoming		A small Dryolestid dryolestoid.
Araeodon	A. intermissus	Utah and Wyoming		A paurodontid dryolestoid, somewhat smaller than Archaeotrigon and Paurodon. Considered to be a junior synonym of Paurodon valens by Averianov and Martin (2015).
Archaeotrigon	A. brevimaxillus	Wyoming		Paurodontid dryolestoids similar in appearance to Paurodon. Both species were considered to be junior synonyms of Paurodon valens by Averianov and Martin (2015).
Archaeotrigon	A. distagmus			Paurodontid dryolestoids similar in appearance to Paurodon. Both species were considered to be junior synonyms of Paurodon valens by Averianov and Martin (2015).
Comotherium	C. richi	Wyoming		A paurodontid dryolestoid.
Dryolestes	D. obtusus			Dryolestid dryolestoids.
Dryolestes	D. priscus	Wyoming		Dryolestid dryolestoids.
Dryolestes	D. tenax			Dryolestid dryolestoids.
Euthlastus	E. cordiformis	Wyoming		A paurodontid dryolestoid.
Foxraptor	F. atrox	Wyoming		A paurodontid dryolestoid similar in size to Paurodon. Considered to be a junior synonym of Paurodon valens by Averianov and Martin (2015).
Herpetairus	H. sp.			
Kepolestes	K. coloradensis	Colorado		
Laolestes	L. eminens			Common Dryolestid dryolestoids.
Laolestes	L. grandis			Common Dryolestid dryolestoids.
Malthacolestes	M. sp.			
Melanodon	M. goodrichi M. hodsoni M. oweni			
Miccylotyrans	M. minimus			A Dryolestid dryolestoid.
Paurodon	P. valens	Wyoming		A paurodontid dryolestoid.
Pelicopsis	P. dubius	Wyoming		A paurodontid dryolestoid. Considered to be a junior synonym of Paurodon valens by Averianov and Martin (2015).
Tathiodon	T. agilis	Wyoming		A paurodontid dryolestoid.

== See also ==
- List of dinosaur-bearing rock formations
- Molluscs
- Synthesis
- lacustrine carbonates

== Footnotes ==
=== Bibliography ===
- Foster, J. (2007). Jurassic West: The Dinosaurs of the Morrison Formation and Their World. Indiana University Press. 389pp. ISBN 978-0-253-34870-8
- Lockley, M.; Harris, J.D.; and Mitchell, L. 2008. "A global overview of pterosaur ichnology: tracksite distribution in space and time." Zitteliana. B28. p. 187-198. ISSN 1612-4138
