= Como Bluff =

Coordinates: 41°54′58″N 106°03′51″W

- U.S. National Register of Historic Places
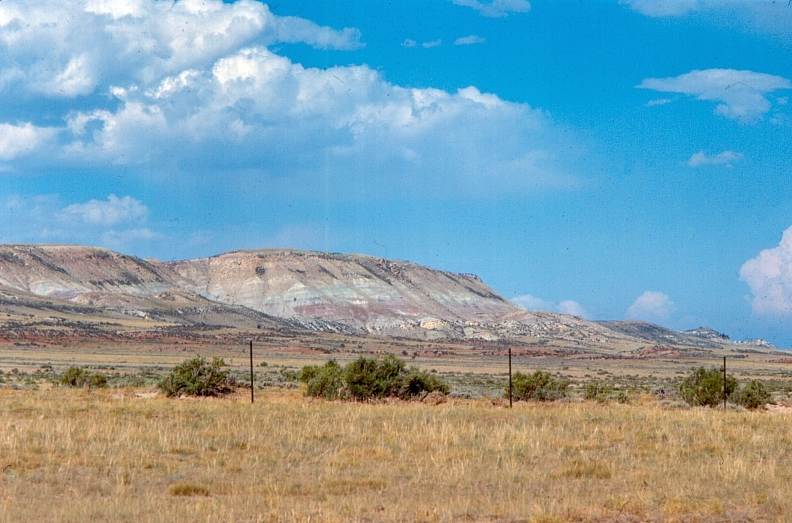
- Multicolored (variegated) beds of the Morrison Formation at Como Bluff, Wyoming. Many historical dinosaur sites are located along the flanks of the bluff. The Sundance Formation is visible as the reddish beds at the base of the bluff.

- Location within Wyoming Location within the United States
- Location: taken near Aurora Lake (a.k.a. Como Lake).
- Nearest city: Rock River-Medicine Bow
- NRHP reference No.: 73001925
- Added to NRHP: January 18, 1973

Como Bluff is a long ridge extending east–west, located between the towns of Rock River and Medicine Bow, Wyoming. The ridge is an anticline, formed as a result of compressional geological folding. Three geological formations, the Sundance, the Morrison, and the Cloverly Formations, containing fossil remains from the Late Jurassic of the Mesozoic Era, are exposed.

Nineteenth-century paleontologists discovered many well-preserved specimens of dinosaurs, as well as mammals, turtles, crocodilians, and fish from the Morrison Formation. Because of this, Como Bluff is considered to be one of the major sites for the early discovery of dinosaur remains. Among the species discovered is the only known specimen of Coelurus. Significant discoveries were made in 22 different areas scattered along the entire length of the ridge. It is included on the National Register of Historic Places as well as the National Natural Landmark list.

== History of discovery ==
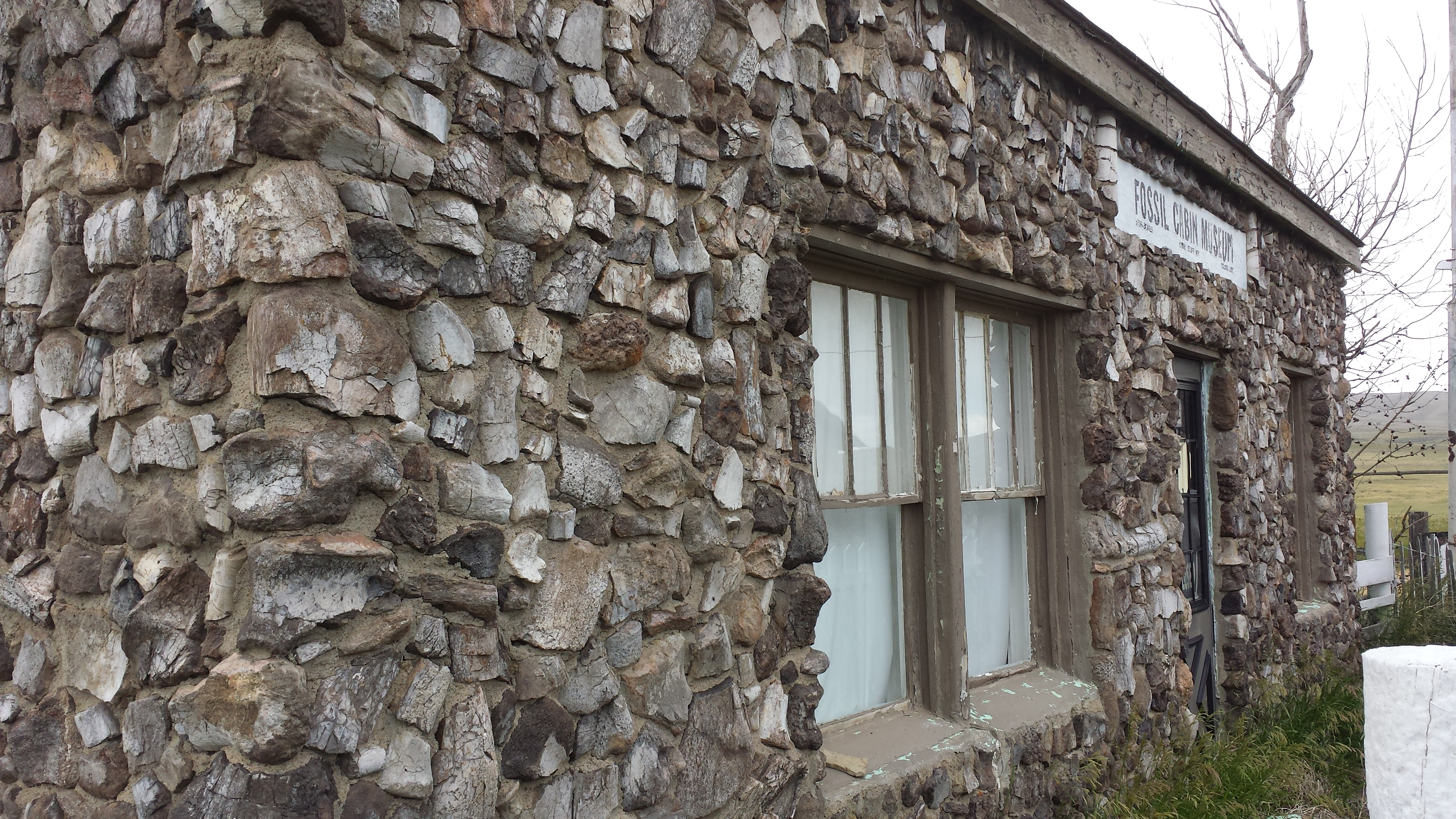
The Fossil Cabin at Como Bluff, built in 1932 from broken dinosaur bones.

The discovery of dinosaurs at Como Bluff has been recounted numerous times, most notably by Schuchert and LeVene, Shur, Ostrom and McIntosh, and Jaffe. Most of the specimens were collected by men working for O.C. Marsh between 1877 and 1889, although some were collected by the Hubbel brothers for E.D. Cope between 1879 and 1880. The American Museum of Natural History (AMNH) excavated in 1897 -1898 , finding two partial skeletons of sauropods. A summary of the quarries and their contents is given below.

In later years, the American Museum of Natural History and Yale University jointly reopened Quarry 9, the Mammal Quarry, 1968–1970, finding only a few specimens. More recently, Robert Bakker has done some collecting there with a variety of groups.

In addition to the major significance of dinosaur discoveries at Como Bluff, the site has also been the source of significant early mammal fossils. In early 1878, Marsh was ecstatic to find that one of his men had uncovered a fossil from a Jurassic mammal. Within a year, the historic Quarry 9 at Como was discovered, producing an astounding 250 specimens, which increased the knowledge of Jurassic mammals exponentially.

== Como Bluff historical quarries (pre-1900) ==
Data source:. . . (h)= holotype

=== AMNH Quarries ===
Excavated by the American Museum of Natural History

==== AMNH Quarry 1 ====
Dinosauria
Saurischia

Sauropoda

Diplodocus sp

==== AMNH Quarry 2 ====
Dinosauria
Saurischia

Sauropoda

Brontosaurus excelsus
Camarasaurus sp,

==== AMNH localities unknown ====
(some could be from Quarry 1 or 2)

Reptilia
Testudines

Amphichelydia

Glyptops plicatus

Squamata

?Sauria indeterminant
Lacertilia

Paramacellodus sp.

Choristodera

Cteniogenys antiquus

Crocodilia

Mesosuchia

Goniopholis sp.

=== Frederick Brown's Quarries ===
==== Brown's Quarry A ====
Dinosauria
Ornithischia

Stegosauria

Stegosaurus sp.

==== Brown's Quarry B ====
Dinosauria
Ornithischia

Stegosauria

Stegosaurus sp.

==== Brown's Quarry C ====
Dinosauria
Saurischia

Theropoda

Allosaurus fragilis

==== Brown's Quarry D ====
Dinosauria
Saurischia

Theropoda

Allosaurus fragilis

==== Brown's Quarry G ====
Dinosauria
Saurischia

Sauropoda

Camarasaurus sp.

=== Arthur Lakes Quarry 1A. (Big Canyon Quarry) ===
Excavated by Arthur Lakes.

Dinosauria
Saurischia

Theropoda

Allosaurus sp.

Sauropoda

Camarasaurus sp.

Ornithischia

Ornithopoda

Camptosaurus amplus (h) (now Allosaurus sp.)

=== E.D. Cope's Quarries ===
Excavated by Edward Drinker Cope

==== Cope's Quarry 3 ====
Dinosauria
Saurischia

Theropoda

Allosaurus sp.

==== Cope's Quarry 4 ====
Dinosauria
Saurischia

Theropoda

Allosaurus sp.

Ornithischia

Stegosauria

Stegosaurus sp.

==== Cope's Quarry 5 ====
Reptilia
Pterosauria

Dermodactylus montanus

Dinosauria
Saurischia

Sauropoda

Apatosaurus sp.

==== Cope's localities unknown ====
(could be from Quarry 1, 2)

Reptilia
Testudines

Amphichelydia

Dinochelys sp.
Glyptops plicatus

Crocodilia

Mesosuchia

Goniopholis sp.

Dinosauria
Ornithischia

Ornithopoda

?Camptosaurus sp.

Stegosauria

Stegosaurus sp.

Mammalia
genus and species indeterminant

=== William Harlow Reed's Quarries ===
Excavated by William Harlow Reed.

==== Reed's Quarry 1 ====
Dinosauria
Saurischia

Theropoda

Allosaurus atrox (h) (now Allosaurus fragilis)

Sauropoda

Camarasaurus grandis (h)
Camarasaurus impar (h) (now Camarasaurus grandis)
Camarasaurus robustus (h) (now Camarasaurus grandis)
Pleurocoelus montanus (h) (now Camarasaurus grandis)
Diplodocus sp.

Mammalia

genus and species indeterminant

==== Reed's Quarry 1 ½ ====
Dinosauria
Saurischia

Theropoda

Allosaurus fragilis

Sauropoda

genus and species indeterminant

==== Reed's Quarry 2 ====
Dinosauria
Saurischia

Sauropoda

Apatosaurus sp.

==== Reed's Quarry 3 ====
Dinosauria
Saurischia

Theropoda

Allosaurus lucaris (h) (now Allosaurus sp.)

Sauropoda

Camarasaurus grandis

Ornithischia

Ornithopoda

Dryosaurus sp.

Stegosauria

Stegosaurus sp.

==== Reed's Quarry 4 ====
Dinosauria
Saurischia

Theropoda

Allosaurus fragilis

Sauropoda

Apatosaurus sp.
Barosaurus sp.
Camarasaurus sp.

Ornithischia

Stegosauria

Stegosaurus sp.

==== Reed's Quarry 5 ====
Reptilia
Pterosauria

Dermodactylus montanus (h) (now nomen dubium)

Dinosauria
Saurischia

Sauropoda

Diplodocus sp.

Ornithischia

Ornithopoda

Dryosaurus altus (h)

==== Reed's Quarry 6 ====
Reptilia
Crocodylia

Mesosuchia

Goniopholis sp.

==== Reed's Quarry 7 (Three Trees Quarry) ====
Dinosauria
Ornithischia

Ornithopoda

Laosaurus consors (h) (now Othnielosaurus consors)

==== Reed's Quarry 8 ====
Reptilia
Testudines

genus and species indeterminant

Crocodilia

Mesosuchia

Goniopholis sp.

Dinosauria
Saurischia

Theropoda

Allosaurus sp.
Coelurus fragilis

Sauropoda

Camarasaurus sp.
Diplodocus sp.

Ornithischia

Stegosauria

Stegosaurus sp.

==== Reed's Quarry 9 (Mammal Quarry) ====
Osteichthyes
Actinopterygii

genus and species indeterminant

Amiiformes

Ophiopsis sp.

Sarcopterygii

Dipnoi

Ceratodus guentheri

Amphibia
Anura

Comobatrachus aenigmatis

Discoglossoidea

Enneabatrachus hechti

Pelobatidae indeterminant
Pipoidea?

Eobatrachus agilis (h)

Caudata

genus and species indeterminant
Comonecturoides marshi (h)

Reptilia
Testudines

Amphichelydia

Dinochelys whitei
Glyptops ornatus

Squamata

?Sauria indeterminant
Lacertilia

Dorsetisaurus sp.
Paramacellodus sp.

Rhynchocephalia

Opisthias rarus (h)
Theretairus antiquus (h)

Choristodera

Cteniogenys antiquus (h)

Crocodylia

Sphenosuchia

Macelognathus vagans (h)

Mesosuchia

Goniopholis sp.

Dinosauria
Saurischia

Theropoda

Allosaurus fragilis
Ceratosaurus nasicornis
Coelurus fragilis
Ornitholestes hermanni?

Tyrannosauroidea

Stokesosaurus clevelandi?

Sauropoda

Macronaria indeterminant
Diplodocidae indeterminant

Ornithischia

Ornithopoda

Othnielosaurus consors
Dryosaurus sp.
Camptosaurus sp.

Stegosauria

Stegosaurus sp.

Pterosauria

Rhamphorhynchoidea

Laopteryx priscus (h) (now nomen dubium)

Mammalia
Docodonta

Docodontidae

Docodon affinis (h)
Docodon crassus (h)
Docodon striatus (h)
Docodon superus (h)
Docodon victor (h)

Multituberculata

Allodontidae

Ctenacodon laticeps (h)
Ctenacodon scindens (h)
Ctenacodon serratus (h)
Psalodon fortis (h)
Psalodon potens (h)
?Psalodon marshi (h)

Triconodonta

Amphilestidae

Aploconodon comoensis (h)
Comodon gidleyi (h)

Triconodontidae

Priacodon ferox (h)
Priacodon grandaevus (h)
Priacodon lulli (h)
Priacodon robustus (h)
Trioracodon bisulcus (h)

Symmetrodonta

Amphidontidae

Amphidon superstes (h)

Tinodontidae

Tinodon bellus (h)
Eurylambda aequicrurius

Dryolestida

Dryolestidae

Amblotherium gracilis (h)
Dryolestes priscus
Dryolestes obtusus (h)
Dryolestes vorax (h)
Laolestes eminens (h)
Laolestes (Melanodon) goodrichi (h)
Laolestes (Melanodon) oweni (h)
Miccylotyrans minimus (h)

Paurodontidae

Araeodon intermissus (h)
Archaeotrigon brevimaxillus (h)
Archaeotrigon distagmus (h)
Comotherium richi (h)
Euthlastus cordiformis (h)
Paurodon valens (h)
Tathiodon agilis (h)

==== Reed's Quarry 10 ====
Dinosauria
Saurischia

Sauropoda

Brontosaurus excelsus (h)

==== Reed's Quarry 11 ====
Dinosauria
Saurischia

Sauropoda

Apatosaurus amplus (h) (now Brontosaurus excelsus)

Ornithischia

Stegosauria

Stegosaurus duplex (h) (now Stegosaurus ungulatus)

Mammalia
genus and species indeterminant

==== Reed's Quarry 12 (Robbers' Roost Quarry) ====
Reptilia
Testudines

genus and species indeterminant

Crocodylia

Mesosuchia

Goniopholis sp.

Dinosauria
Saurischia

Theropoda

Allosaurus sp.
Torvosaurus tanneri
Coelurus sp.
Fosterovenator churei

Sauropoda

Camarasaurus sp.
Diplodocus sp.

Ornithischia
ornithopoda

genus and species indeterminant

Stegosauria

Stegosaurus ungulatus (h)

==== Reed's Quarry 13 ====
Reptilia
Testudines

Amphichelydia

Glyptops plicatulus

Crocodylia

Mesosuchia

Goniopholis sp.

Dinosauria
Saurischia

Theropoda

Coelurus agilis (h) (part of Coelurus fragilis holotype)
Coelurus fragilis (h)

Saurischia

Sauropoda

?Brachiosaurus sp.
Camarasaurus lentus (h)
Diplodocus sp.

Ornithischia

Ornithopoda

Camptonotus dispar (h) (now Camptosaurus dispar)
Camptosaurus medius (h)
Camptosaurus nanus (h)
Camptosaurus browni (h)
Dryosaurus sp.

Stegosauria

Diracodon laticeps (h) (now Stegosaurus sp.)
Stegosaurus sulcatus (h)
Stegosaurus stenops
Stegosaurus ungulatus

==== Reed Quarry 14 ====
Dinosauria
Saurischia

Theropoda

Allosaurus ferox (h) (now Allosaurus fragilis)

== See also ==
- List of fossil sites (with link directory)
