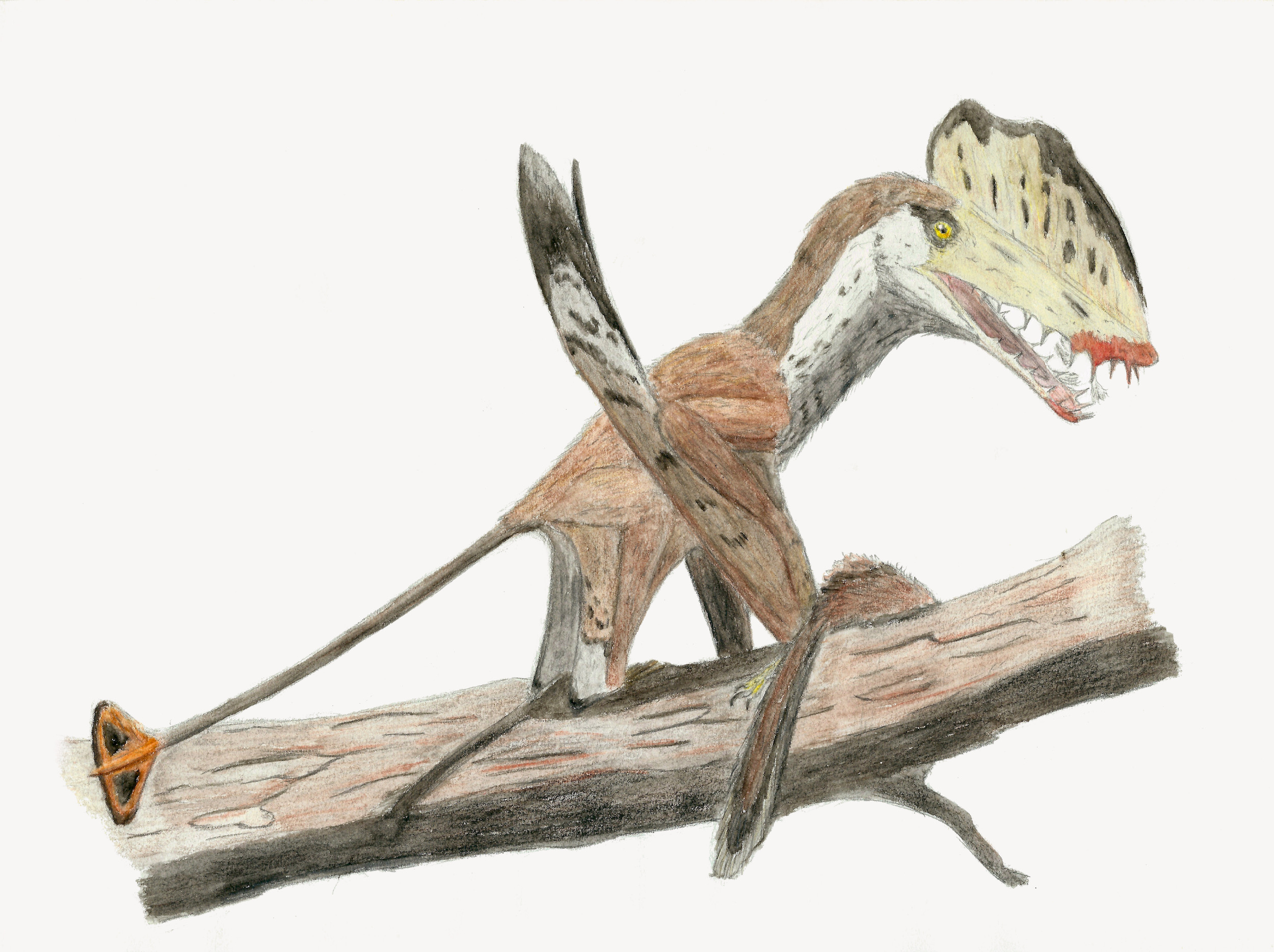
- Life restoration

Scientific classification
- Kingdom: Animalia
- Phylum: Chordata
- Class: Reptilia
- Order: †Pterosauria
- Family: †Rhamphorhynchidae
- Genus: †Harpactognathus; Carpenter et al., 2003
- Species: †H. gentryii

Binomial name
- †Harpactognathus gentryii Carpenter et al., 2003

= Harpactognathus =

Harpactognathus Temporal range: Late Jurassic, Kimmeridgian

Extinct genus of reptiles

Harpactognathus (meaning "seizing/grasping jaw") is a genus of pterosaur, a group of extinct flying reptiles, that lived during the Kimmeridgian stage of the Late Jurassic period in what is now Wyoming, United States. Harpactognathus is confidently known from a single, incomplete rostrum (front of the skull) found in 1996 at the Bone Cabin Quarry, though an incomplete mandible (lower jaw bone) and humerus (upper arm bone) from the quarry have tentatively been referred to the genus. The rostrum was described by paleontologist Kenneth Carpenter and colleagues in 2003, who named the type and only known species, H. gentryii, after Joe Gentry, a volunteer for the Western Paleontological Laboratories in Lehi, Utah.

Harpactognathus is a large-sized pterosaur, with an estimated wingspan of 2.5 metres (8.2 ft) and estimated complete skull length of 280–300 millimetres (11–12 in), making it among the largest known non-pterodactyloid pterosaurs. The rostrum of Harpactognathus is robust, broad, and wider than tall. On the midline of the skull is a premaxillary (front upper jaw bone) crest that may have been extended by soft tissues and used for sexual display or been sexually dimorphic. Due to a lack of remains, much of its anatomy is unknown and can only be inferred from related taxa.

When Harpactognathus was described, it was assigned to the subfamily Scaphognathinae within Rhamphorhynchidae, a group of long-tailed, toothed non-pterodactyloid pterosaurs. However, the descriptions of the rhamphorhynchines Sericipterus and Angustinaripterus, which are similar to Harpactognathus, suggest it was a member of Rhamphorhynchinae instead. Based on its teeth, robusticity, and paleoenvironment, Harpactognathus was a terrestrial carnivore that lived near freshwater areas in contrast to the piscivorous lifestyles of relatives like Rhamphorhynchus.

Harpactognathus was found in the strata of the Morrison Formation, which bears a variety of other fossils. This includes several other genera of pterosaurs, such as Mesadactylus and Dermodactylus, as well as many unnamed pterosaurs. In addition to pterosaurs, the Morrison Formation preserves fossils of many dinosaurs, including sauropods, theropods, and ornithischians, crocodylomorphs, mammals, lizards, turtles, and more.

== Discovery and naming ==
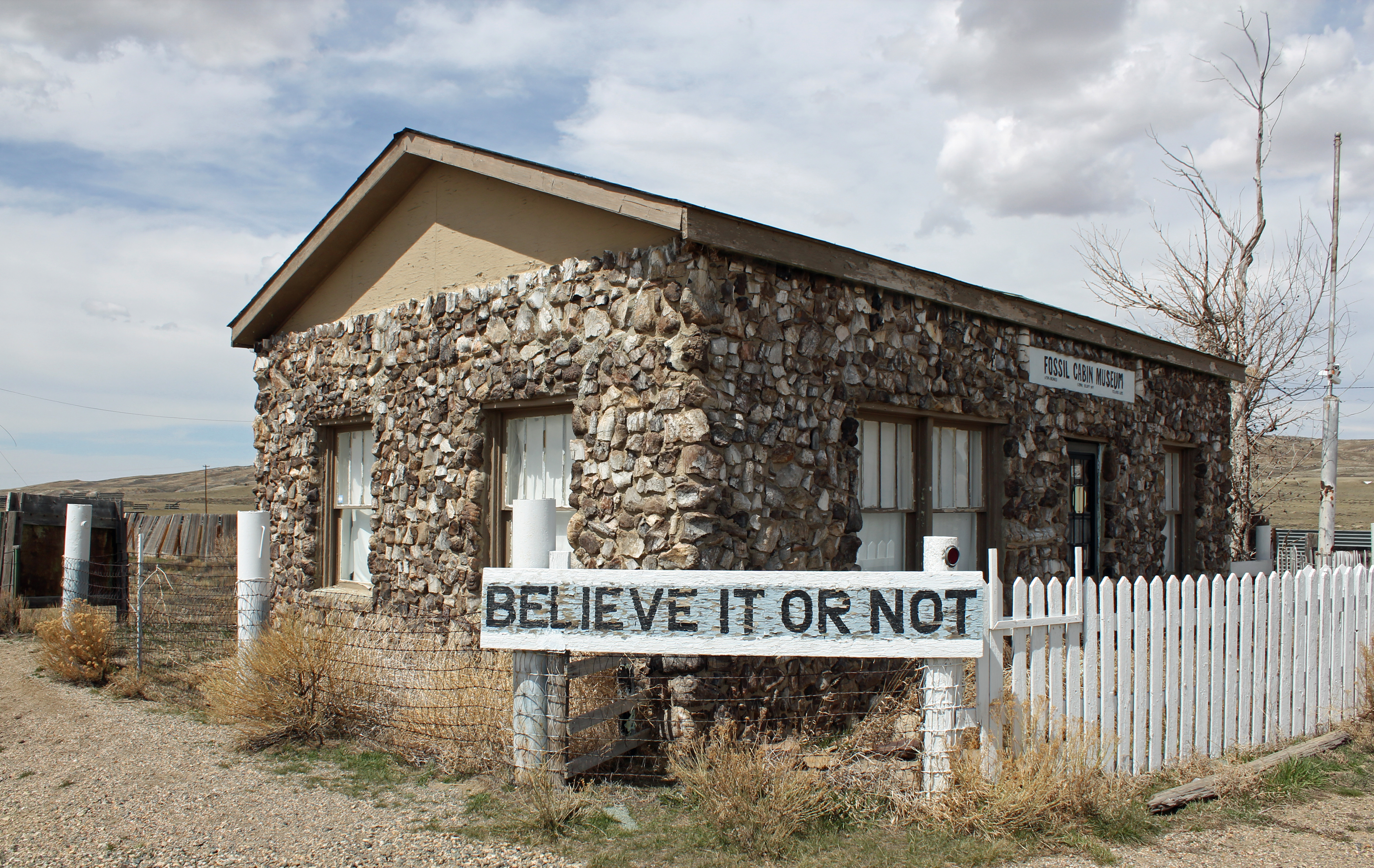
The Bone Cabin at Bone Cabin Quarry, where Harpactognathus fossils were first unearthed.

In 1996 during excavations of the Bone Cabin Quarry in Albany, Wyoming, an incomplete rostrum of a pterosaur was unearthed in strata deriving from the upper limits of the Salt Wash Member of the Morrison Formation. These strata are composed of fluvial channel deposits, coarse sand, and sand-pebble conglomerates which date to the late Kimmeridgian stage of the Late Jurassic period. In 1999, a pterosaur mandible was found within a meter of the rostrum fragment. In 2003, American paleontologist Kenneth Carpenter and colleagues described the rostrum as belonging to a new genus and species of scaphognathine pterosaur, Harpactognathus gentryii. The rostrum fragment was chosen to be the holotype (specimen used as the basis for the taxon), cataloged under specimen number NAMAL 101, whereas the status of the mandible fragment was left uncertain. The holotype resides in the Stewart Museum of Paleontology at Ogden's George S. Eccles Dinosaur Park in northern Utah. The generic name Harpactognathus, meaning "seizing/grasping jaws", comes from the Greek roots harpact, "seize" or "grab", and gnathus, "jaws". The specific name gentryii is in honor of Joe Gentry, a volunteer for the western Paleontological Laboratories in Lehi, Utah. Prior to the naming of Harpactognathus, the pterosaur Comodactylus ostromi was named in 1981 by researcher Peter Galton on the basis of a fourth metacarpal, a wing bone, (YPM 9150) that had been found in Como Bluff, Wyoming, another Morrison Formation site. Comodactylus was later declared a nomen dubium, though Carpenter and colleagues noted that this fourth metacarpal may belong to Harpactognathus based on its size and rhamphorhynchid characteristics. However, a lack of overlap makes this impossible to prove.

In a 2014 study, paleontologist S. Christopher Bennett argued that the mandible as well as a large pterosaur humerus (upper arm bone; EDP-SM 2017.02.003) belong to the same individual as the holotype rostrum. This would expand the known material of Harpactognathus from a rostrum to also include a mandible and a humerus. Bennett stated that the large size, morphology, and close proximity of the mandible and humerus to the holotype mean that they could have come from the same individual. Additionally, no other pterosaur remains were found in the Bone Cabin Quarry, making it parsimonious to assign all of these elements to the same individual. However, the referral of the mandible to Harpactognathus is questionable, as it is likely from a different type of rhamphorynchid or rhamphorhynchine based on its slender nature and the anatomy of its alveoli (tooth-bearing holes in the skull). In a 2025 paper, paleontologists Michael Sprague and Matthew McLain described the humerus in detail, which they assigned to Harpactognathus based on its size, location, and parsimony.

== Description ==
Harpactognathus is definitively known from a single, incomplete rostrum that measures 130 millimetres (5.1 in) in preserved length and 42.5 millimetres (1.67 in) at its widest preserved point (estimated skull length of 280–300 mm (11–12 in)). This is extremely large for a rhamphorhynchid, indicating an estimated wingspan of at least 2.5 m (8.2 ft). This makes Harpactognathus among the largest known non-pterodactyloid pterosaurs, comparable in size to Sericipterus, Angustinaripterus, the largest Rhamphorhynchus, and Dearc. EDP-SM 2017.02.003, a right humerus assigned to Harpactognathus, is among the largest known pre-Cretaceous pterosaur humeri, measuring 110.5 millimetres (4.35 in) in length.

=== Skull ===
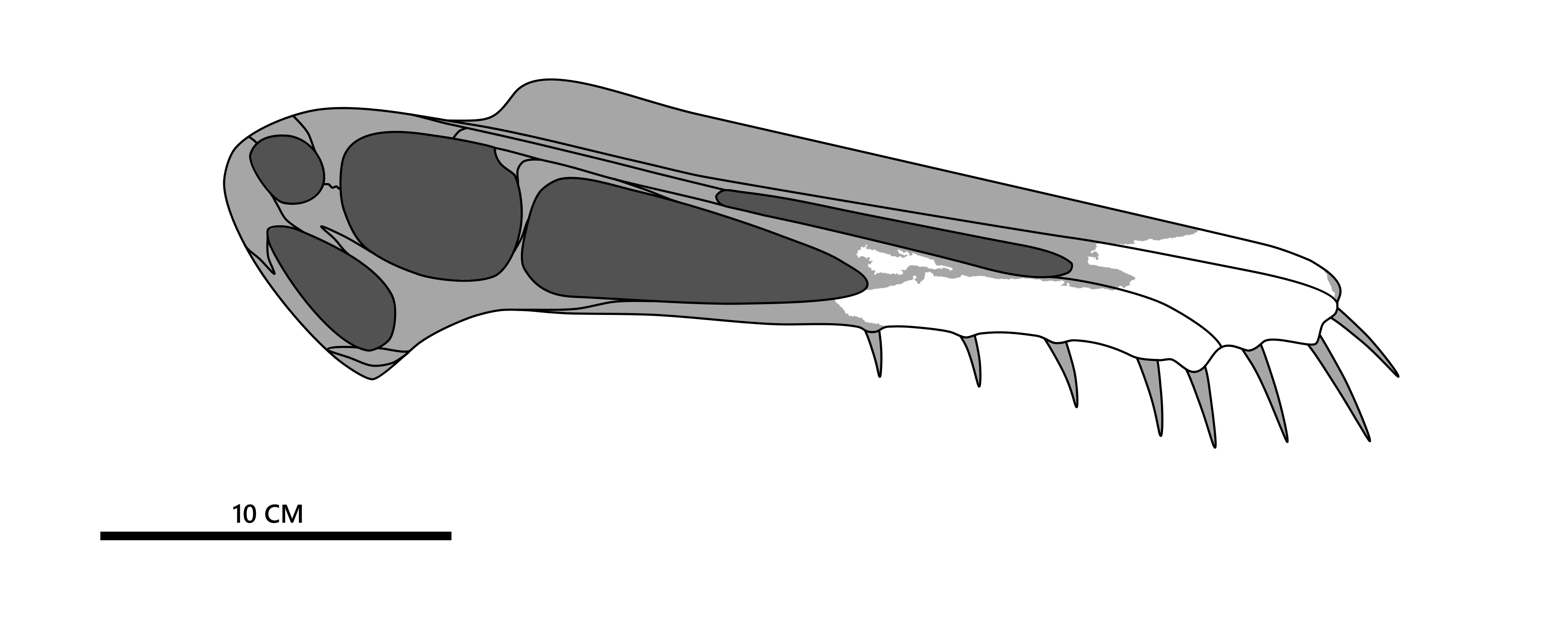
Skull reconstruction of Harpactognathus, with preserved material in white

Much of the skull is missing and the preserved portion is dorsoventrally (top-bottom) compressed by taphonomy. The rostral region itself is extremely broad and would have been wider than tall in life, a feature absent in many rhamphorhynchids. The widened portion of the rostrum contains four pairs of teeth in Harpactognathus, meanwhile in Angustinaripterus it incorporates three and Sericipterus it only incorporates two. The tooth count differs as well between these genera, with Harpactognathus' rostrum containing at least 12 teeth whereas Angustinaripterus' bears 18 and Sericipterus' has 10-14. The tip of the rostrum is missing but the premaxilla (anteriormost upper jaw bone) is preserved. The premaxilla tapers anteriorly (front) and forms a pointed tip that is made up of the two fused premaxillae. The premaxilla differs from those of other rhamphorhynchids, besides Sericipterus and Angustinaripterus, in that it bears a thin crest which extends above the nares (nose holes) from the tip of the premaxilla to likely the rest of the skull. The crest is made up of a midline process at the anterior tip of the rostrum that joins with a low premaxillary crest, together forming this thin crest. While the cross-section of this midline process is triangle-shaped in Harpactognathus, it is elliptical in Sericipterus and Angustinaripterus. However, much of this premaxillary crest is missing from the holotype. Its nares are narrow, elongate, and bear openings with acute angles at their posterior (back) and anterior ends, a characteristic found in Rhamphorhynchus and Dorygnathus. As for the maxilla, its main body is convex and the maxilla extends across the length of the rostrum.

Overall, the silhouette of the maxilla is similar to that of Scaphognathus and Sordes, though its robusticity is more similar to that of Sericipterus. At its posterior end, the maxilla is divided into a jugal process and a robust nasal process. The maxilla ends posteriorly at the antorbital fenestra (a large opening in front of the eye sockets). The maxillary wall of the antorbital fenestra bears a shallow triangular fossa (a depression in bone) at its anterior edge, a characteristic absent in other rhamphorhynchid genera. At its dorsal surface, Harpatognathus' maxilla has a dorsally thickened nasal process (the part of the maxilla that articulates with the nasal), a characteristic distinct from Sericipterus and Angustinaripterus. The palate (mouth roof) is flat, deeply recessed, and contains the maxilla, premaxilla, and palatines (palate bones). On the posterior end of the palate is a pair of choanae (internal nares), which are ovular, elongated, and separated by a medial bar. On the scalloped lateral surfaces of the premaxilla and maxilla (upper jaw bone) are large gaps inbetween alveoli, a characteristic diagnostic of Harpactognathus. These scalloped surfaces are striking, being visible in both dorsal and lateral view. Although unique at the time of its description, many diagnostic traits for Harpactognathus stated by Carpenter et al are now recognized as belonging to Sericipterus and/or Angustinaripterus. However, later studies have still recognized Harpactognathus as diagnostic.

== Classification ==
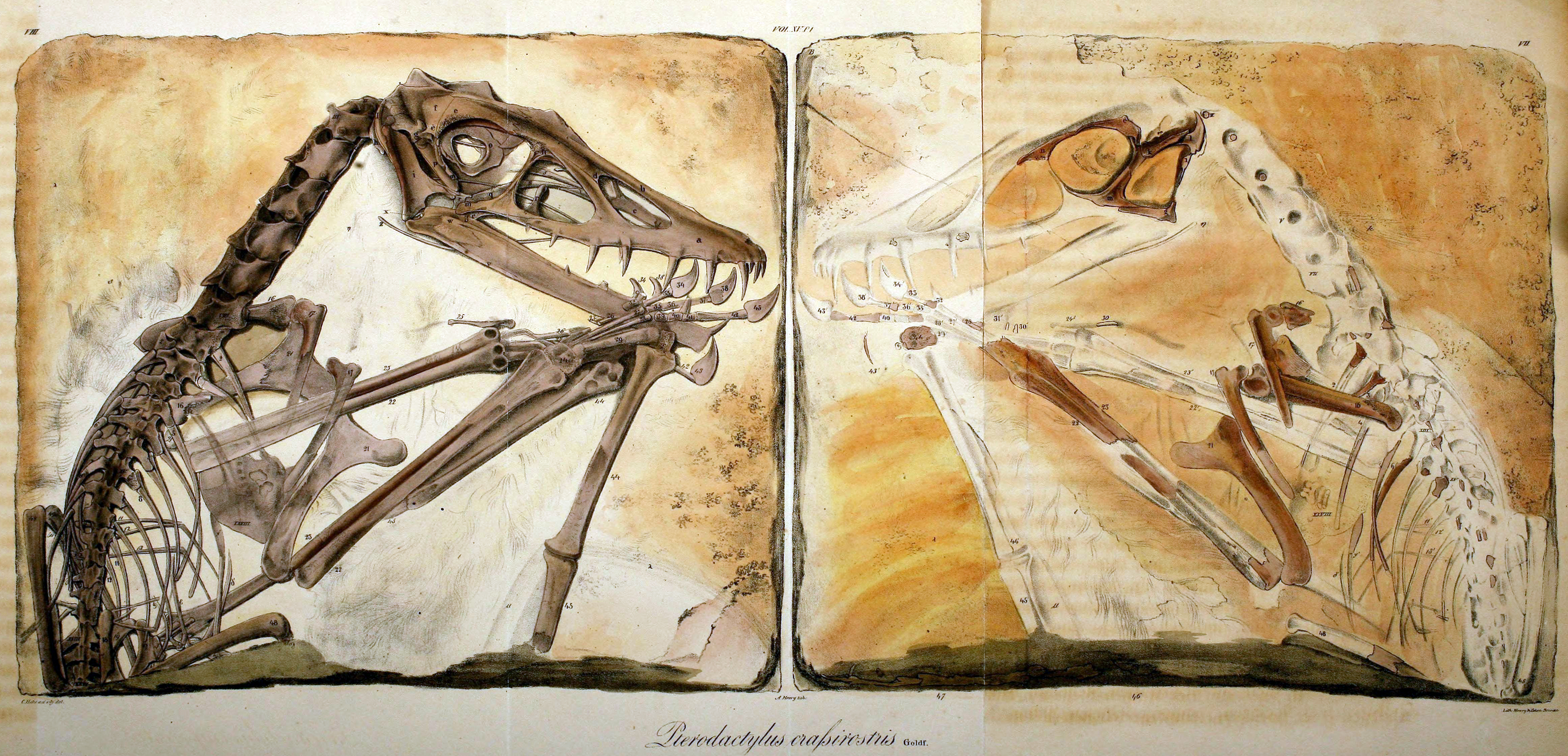
Skeleton of Scaphognathus, a previously purported relative of Harpactognathus

Harpactognathus is a genus in the family Rhamphorhynchidae, however its position within the family is contested. Harpactognathus lacks the deep skull anatomy observed in basal non-pterodactyloids like dimorphodontids and anurognathids or the nasoantoribital fenestra (a large opening in front of the eye socket containing the nasal and antorbital fenestra) seen in pterodactyloids, allowing it to be classified as a rhamphorhynchid or campylognathid. However, Harpactognathus cannot be classified as a campylognathid based on its tooth count and alveolar anatomy. Rhamphorhyncidae contains two subfamilies; Rhamphorhynchinae and Scaphognathinae. Rhamphorynchines are distinguished from scaphognathines by their slender skulls, flexible necks, and laterally-oriented teeth. In contrast, Scaphognathines have deep skulls with teeth that interlock vertically as well as robust necks.

When initially described, Harpactognathus was classified within the subfamily Scaphognathinae on account of its tooth count, with all of its teeth widely spaced apart from one another. Additionally, it shares a dorsally flexed anterior rostrum that creates a curve at the end of the snout with other scaphognathines. The shape and proportions of the rostrum as well as the anatomy of the alveoli are comparable to those of Scaphognathus. However, a phylogenetic analysis performed by Brian Andres, James Clark and Xu Xing in 2010 recovered Harpactognathus in Rhamphorhynchinae as a close relative of the large rhamphorhynchids Angustinaripterus and Sericipterus, both of which are now classified within the tribe Angustinaripterini according to Natalia Jagielska and colleagues (2022, 2024). Harpactognathus is similar to these genera in that it has an expanded rostrum, a premaxillary crest, a set of ventrolaterally (down and side)-oriented teeth, and an undulating rostrum margin. Harpactognathus may be in the tribe Angustinaripterini, however it was not included in the phylogenetic analysis conducted by Jagielska et al (2022) due to the fragmentary nature of Harpactognathus. Additionally, Bennett (2014) argued that Harpactognathus cannot belong to Scaphognathinae on account of its laterally compressed, thin teeth which contrast with those of Scaphognathus. Bennett, assuming that the mandible belongs to the same individual as the holotype, noted that the shallow ramus and edentulous (toothless) tip of the mandible exclude Harpactognathus from being a member of Scaphognathinae.

The cladogram (family tree) of rhamphorhynchids below is the result of a large phylogenetic analysis published by Andres & Myers in 2013.

- Breviquartossa
  - Rhamphorhynchidae
    - - Scaphognathus crassirostris
    - Rhamphorhynchinae
      - Dorygnathus banthensis
      - - - Cacibupteryx caribensis
          - Nesodactylus hesperius
          - Rhamphorhynchus muensteri
        - - Harpactognathus gentryii
          - - Angustinaripterus longicephalus
            - Sericipterus wucaiwanensis

== Paleobiology ==
Previously, Scaphognathines were hypothesized to be specialized as aerial predators in inland freshwater habitats. However, more recent publications have suggested scaphognathines lacked specializations for piscivory, and were likely terrestrial predators of small vertebrates or corvid-like generalists. Based on the occurrence of scaphognathines in riverine or lacustrine deposits, it was hypothesized that scaphognathines, along with Harpactognathus, preferred terrestrial freshwater environments in contrast to rhamphorhynchines who preferred coastal environments. This hypothesis was supported by Andres and Xu (2010), who in their description of Sericipterus pointed out that the robust, broad skulls and highly curved teeth of Sericipterus, Angustinaripterus, and Harpactognathus are not adapted to piscivory or interaction with a water surface, supporting the idea that they were terrestrial carnivores.

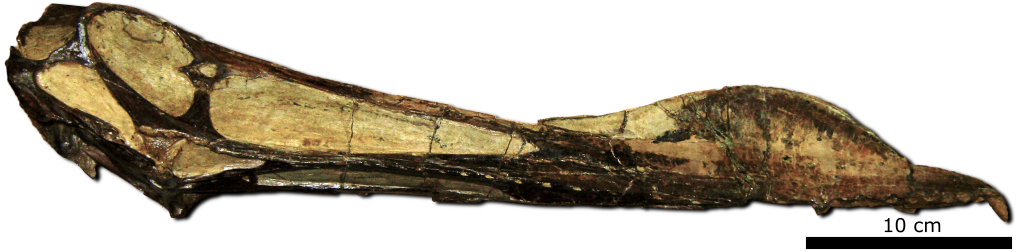
Skull of Anhanguera, another crested pterosaur

Cranial crests can be found across Pterosauria, however not many have been found in rhamphorhynchids. The crest of Harpactognathus is unusual however in that it continues to the tip of the rostrum, a feature not found in the crests of other pterosaurs like tapejarids or ctenochasmatoids. The function of the crest of Harpactognathus was presumed to be for displays purposes by Carpenter et al (2003) due to the fact that in other pterosaurs like Pteranodon and Anhanguera, the crests are sexually dimorphic or acted as a display structure. Harpactognathus' crest likely was extended by soft tissue structures as well based on the crests of Tapejara.

== Paleoecology ==
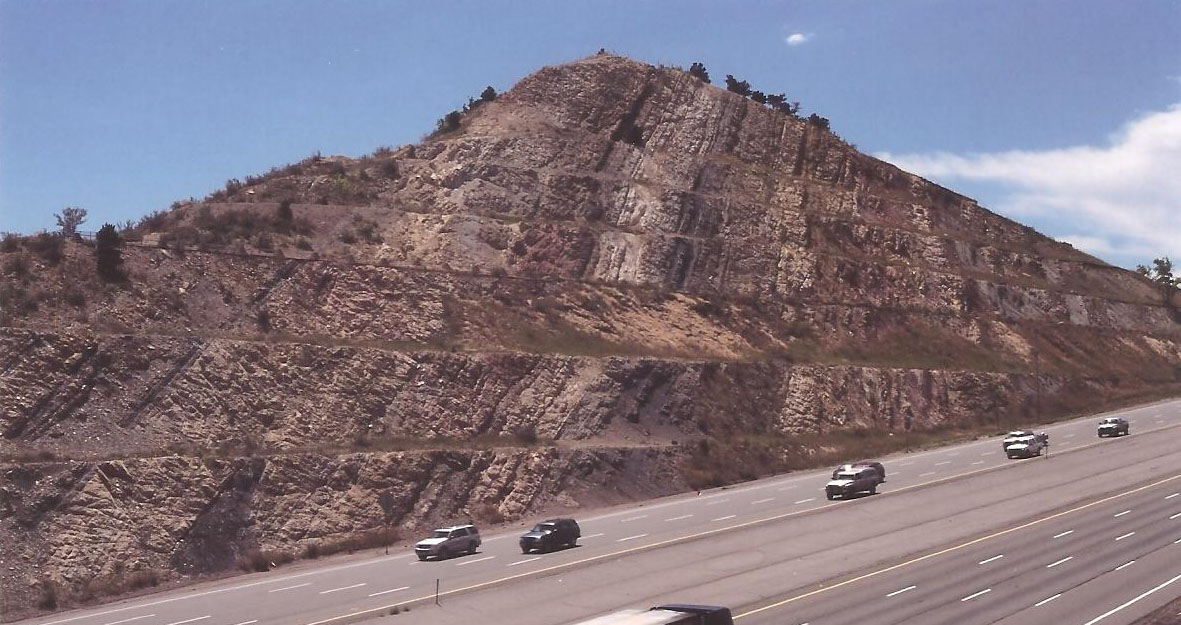
A roadcut of Dinosaur Ridge, a locality in the Morrison Formation

The Morrison Formation is a sequence of shallow marine and alluvial sediments which, according to radiometric dating, ranges between 156.77 million years old (Mya) at its base, and 150 Mya at the top, which places it in the late Oxfordian, Kimmeridgian, and early Tithonian stages of the Late Jurassic period. This formation is interpreted as a semi-arid environment with distinct wet and dry seasons. The Morrison Basin, where pterosaurs and dinosaurs lived, stretched from New Mexico to Alberta and Saskatchewan and was formed when the precursors to the Front Range of the Rocky Mountains started pushing up in the west. The deposits from their east-facing drainage basins were carried by streams and rivers and deposited in swampy lowlands, lakes, river channels, and floodplains. This formation is similar in age to the Lourinhã Formation in Portugal and the Tendaguru Formation in Tanzania.

Pterosaurs known from the Morrison include the possible anurognathid Mesadactylus, the pterodactyloid Kepodactylus, and the possible ctenochasmatid Utahdactylus. Many of the specimens referred to Mesadactylus may in fact belong to other kinds of pterosaurs like pterodactyloids, illustrating a greater diversity of pterosaurs from the formation than previously assumed. Dinosaurs known from the Morrison include the theropods Ceratosaurus, Ornitholestes, and Allosaurus, the sauropods Apatosaurus, Brachiosaurus, Camarasaurus, and Diplodocus, and the ornithischians Camptosaurus, Dryosaurus, and Stegosaurus. Other vertebrates that shared this paleoenvironment included ray-finned fishes, frogs, salamanders, turtles, sphenodonts, lizards, and crocodylomorphs. Shells of bivalves and aquatic snails are also common. The flora of the period has been revealed by fossils of green algae, mosses, horsetails, cycads, ginkgoes, and several families of conifers. Vegetation varied from river-lining gallery forests of tree ferns and ferns, to fern savannas with occasional trees such as the Araucaria-like conifer Brachyphyllum.

== See also ==
- List of pterosaur genera
- Timeline of pterosaur research
