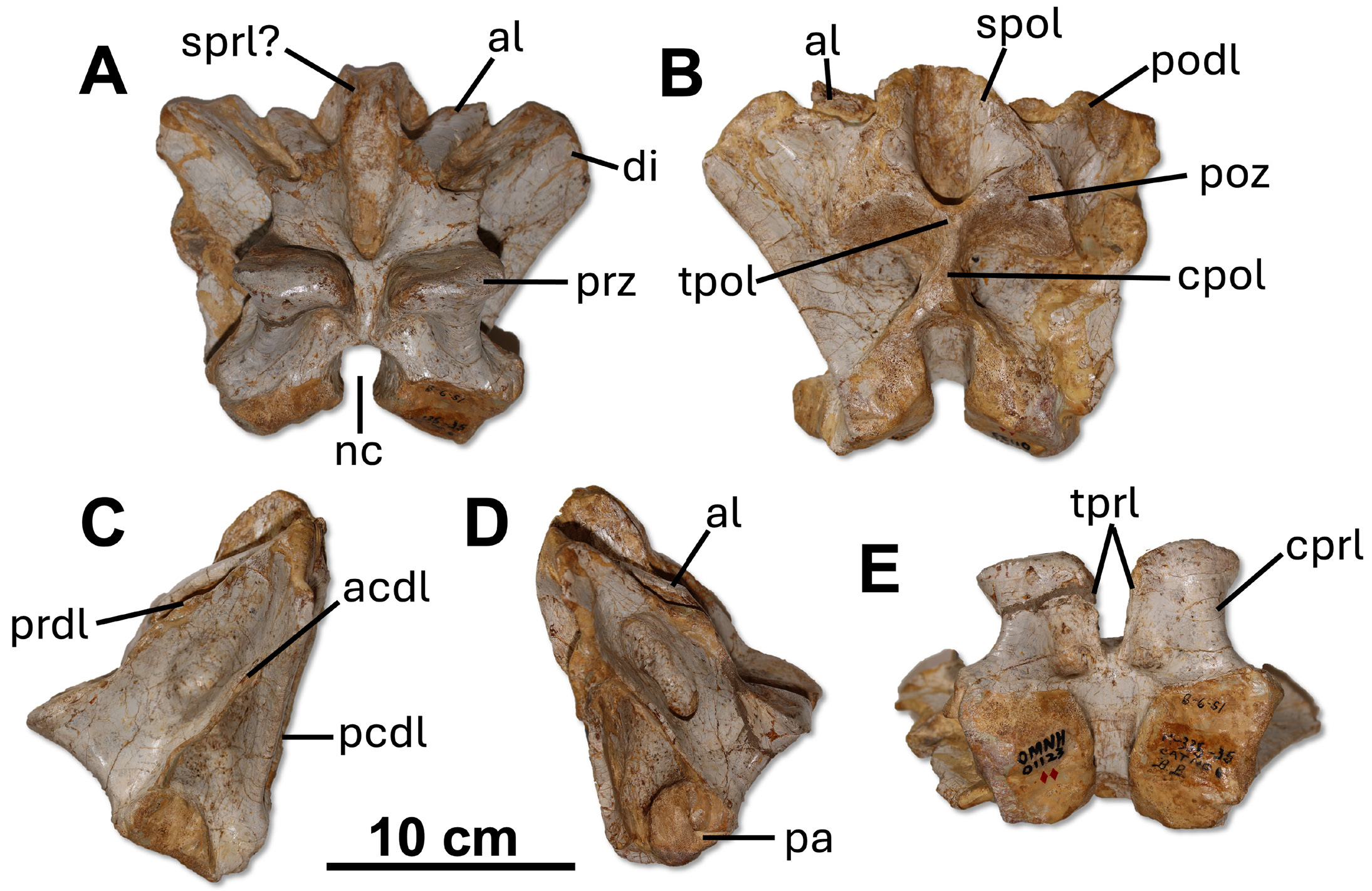
- Holotype specimen, a dorsal neural arch

Scientific classification
- Kingdom: Animalia
- Phylum: Chordata
- Class: Reptilia
- Clade: Dinosauria
- Clade: Saurischia
- Clade: incertae sedis
- Genus: †Saurophaganax; Chure, 1995
- Species: †S. maximus

Binomial name
- †Saurophaganax maximus Chure, 1995

Synonyms
- "Saurophagus maximus" Stovall, 1941 (preoccupied); Allosaurus maximus? (Chure, 1995) Smith, 1998

= Saurophaganax =

Saurophaganax Temporal range: Late Jurassic Kimmeridgian

Dubious saurischian dinosaur genus

Saurophaganax ("lord of lizard-eaters") is a dubious, chimeric genus of large saurischian dinosaur, possibly a sauropod, from the Late Jurassic (Kimmeridgian) Morrison Formation of Oklahoma, United States. This taxon was historically considered to represent a species of Allosaurus or very large allosaurid. However, re-examinations of the attributed specimens suggested that it is a chimera of multiple dinosaur genera, since some specimens most likely belong to a diplodocid sauropod, while the other referred specimens could be reassigned to a novel species of Allosaurus.

== Discovery and naming ==
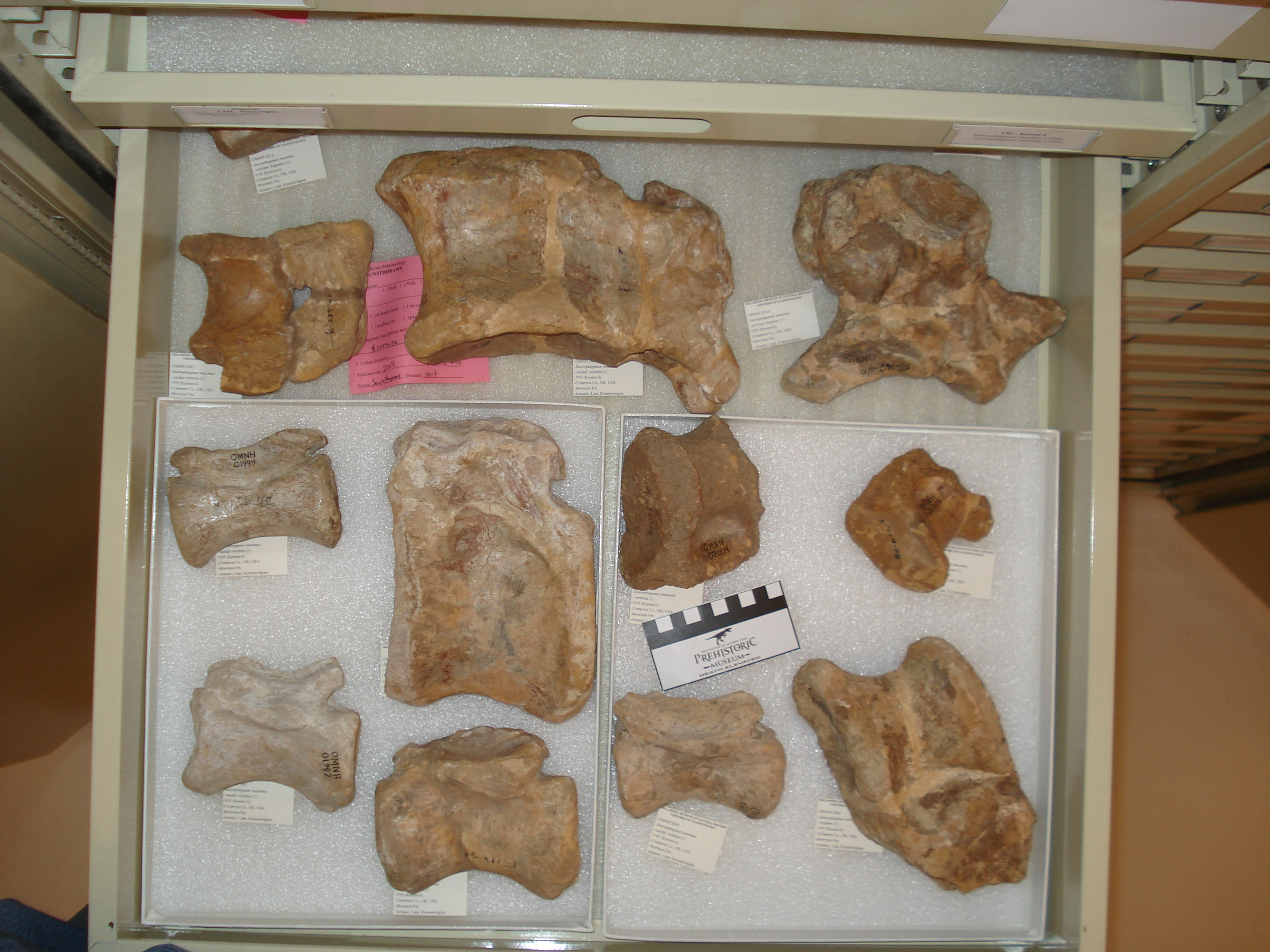
A drawer of vertebrae historically assigned to Saurophaganax, Oklahoma Museum of Natural History

In 1931 and 1932, John Willis Stovall uncovered remains of a large theropod near Kenton in Cimarron County, Oklahoma in layers of the late Kimmeridgian. In 1941, these were named Saurophagus maximus by Stovall in an article by journalist Grace Ernestine Ray. The generic name is derived from Greek σαυρος, sauros, "lizard", φάγειν, phagein, "to eat", with the compound meaning of "lizard eater". The specific epithet maximus means "the largest" in Latin. Because the naming article did not contain a description, the name remained a nomen nudum. In 1987, Spencer George Lucas erroneously made OMNH 4666, a tibia, the lectotype, unaware that Saurophagus was a nomen nudum.

Later, it was discovered that the name Saurophagus was preoccupied: in 1831, it had already been given by William Swainson to a tyrant-flycatcher, an extant eater of taxonomically true lizards. In 1995, Daniel Chure named a new genus Saurophaganax, adding Greek suffix -άναξ, anax which means "ruler", replacing the earlier informal name "Saurophagus"; he also found OMNH 4666 undiagnostic in relation to Allosaurus, so he chose OMNH 1123, a neural arch, as the holotype for Saurophaganax. Much of the material informally named "Saurophagus maximus", namely those diagnostic elements that could be distinguished from Allosaurus, were referred to Saurophaganax maximus by Chure; they contain disarticulated bones of at least four individuals.

In 2024, Danison and colleagues revised the referral of various specimens assigned to Saurophaganax maximus including the fragmentary holotype neural arch (OMNH 1123) based on their comparative analysis. They suggested that the holotype could not confidently be regarded as a theropod or sauropod, although the complex accessory laminae are more comparable to those of sauropods, especially some juvenile specimens of Apatosaurus. Some referred specimens, including the holotype, are more likely belong to diplodocids than the large Kenton 1 Quarry allosaurid, i.e., the specimens are chimeric. Since the holotype neural arch is so fragmentary, the researchers could not confidently refer it to a theropod or sauropod, so they considered Saurophaganax maximus to be a nomen dubium.

=== Previously assigned allosaurid specimens ===
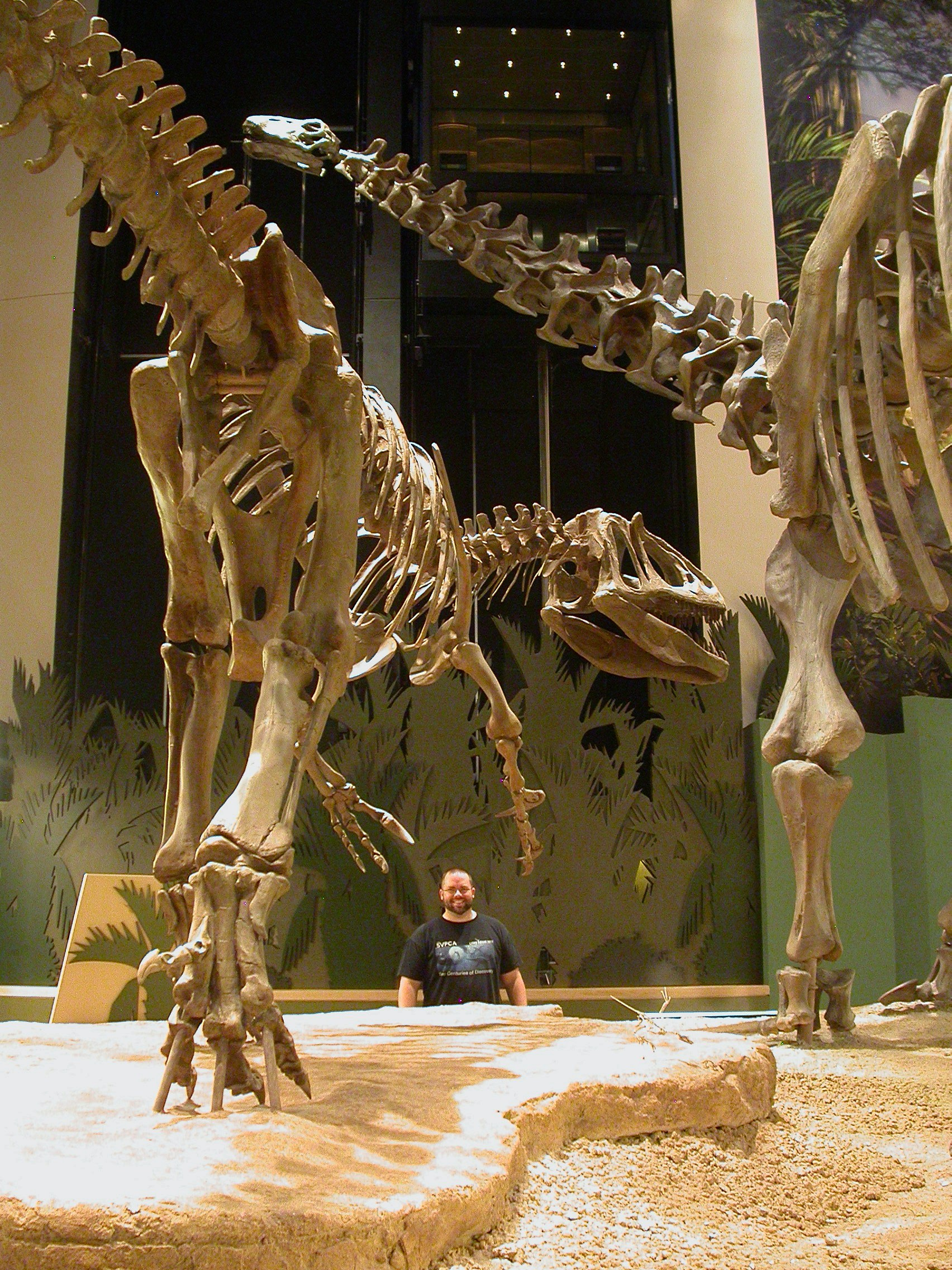
Mounted skeletons showing Saurophaganax as an Allosaurus-like taxon attacking Apatosaurus sp., in Oklahoma Museum of Natural History. The latter dinosaur may be closer to the actual identity of Saurophaganax

The identification of the allosaurid elements referred to Saurophaganax was a matter of dispute. It has been described as its own genus, or as a species of Allosaurus: Allosaurus maximus. A review of basal tetanurans in 2004 and Carrano et al.'s comprehensive 2012 analysis of Tetanurae accepted Saurophaganax as a distinct genus. Possible Saurophaganax material from New Mexico may clear up the status of the genus. In 2019, Rauhut and colleagues noted that the definitive taxonomic placement of Saurophaganax within Allosauroidea is unstable, being recovered as a sister taxon of Metriacanthosauridae or Allosauria, or even as a basalmost carcharodontosaurian. Re-evaluation of the assigned specimens in a 2024 reassessment suggested that the referred allosaurid specimens belong to a novel species of Allosaurus, named as Allosaurus anax.

== Paleoenvironment ==
The Morrison Formation is a sequence of shallow marine and alluvial sediments which, according to radiometric dating, ranges between 156.3 million years old (Ma) at its base, to 146.8 million years old at the top, which places it in the late Oxfordian, Kimmeridgian, and early Tithonian stages of the Late Jurassic period. This formation is interpreted as a semiarid environment with distinct wet and dry seasons. The Morrison Basin where dinosaurs lived, stretched from New Mexico to Alberta and Saskatchewan, and was formed when the precursors to the Front Range of the Rocky Mountains started pushing up to the west. The deposits from their east-facing drainage basins were carried by streams and rivers and deposited in swampy lowlands, lakes, river channels and floodplains. This formation is similar in age to the Solnhofen Limestone Formation in Germany and the Tendaguru Formation in Tanzania. The fossils known of Saurophaganax (both the possible material from New Mexico and the Oklahoma material) are known from the Brushy Basin Member, which is the latest part of the Morrison Formation, suggesting that this genus was either always uncommon or that it first appeared rather late in the Jurassic. Because of the rarity of discovered remains, not much about its behavior is known.

The Morrison Formation records an environment and time dominated by gigantic sauropod dinosaurs such as Barosaurus, Apatosaurus, Brontosaurus, Camarasaurus, Diplodocus, and Brachiosaurus. Dinosaurs that lived alongside Saurophaganax included the herbivorous ornithischians Camptosaurus, Dryosaurus, Stegosaurus, and Nanosaurus. Predators in this paleoenvironment included the theropods Torvosaurus, Ceratosaurus, Marshosaurus, Stokesosaurus, Ornitholestes, and Allosaurus, which accounted for 70 to 75% of theropod specimens and was at the top trophic level of the Morrison food web. Other vertebrates that shared this paleoenvironment included ray-finned fishes, frogs such as Eobatrachus, salamanders, turtles, sphenodonts, lizards, terrestrial and aquatic crocodylomorphs like Goniopholis, and several species of pterosaur like Kepodactylus. Early mammals were present in this region, such as Fruitafossor, docodonts, multituberculates, symmetrodonts, and triconodonts. The flora of the period has been revealed by fossils of green algae, fungi, mosses, horsetails, cycads, ginkgoes, and several families of conifers. Vegetation varied from river-lining forests of tree ferns, and ferns (gallery forests), to fern savannas with occasional trees such as the Araucaria-like conifer Brachyphyllum.

== Sources ==
- Dixon, Dougal. The World Encyclopedia of Dinosaurs and Prehistoric Creatures.
