= Enneabatrachus =

Enneabatrachus Temporal range: Late Jurassic-Early Cretaceous, Kimmeridgian–Berriasian

Scientific classification
- Kingdom: Animalia
- Phylum: Chordata
- Class: Amphibia
- Order: Anura
- Family: Alytidae
- Genus: †Enneabatrachus; Evans and Milner, 1993
- Species: †E. hechti

Binomial name
- †Enneabatrachus hechti Evans and Milner, 1993

Extinct genus of amphibians

Enneabatrachus (meaning "[Quarry] nine frog") is an extinct genus of prehistoric frogs known from the late Jurassic Morrison Formation of the United States and also the Late Jurassic-Early Cretaceous Ksar Metlili Formation of Morocco. The type species is E. hechti (named in 1993), whose remains have been recovered from stratigraphic zone 5.

One specimen has been recovered from Quarry 9 of Como Bluff in Wyoming and another specimen was later reported from Dinosaur National Monument. The Como Bluff specimen was an ilium only a few millimeters long. Indeterminate specimens are known from Morocco.

E. hechti's live weight would have only been a few grams.

== See also ==
- Prehistoric amphibian
  - List of prehistoric amphibians
- Paleobiota of the Morrison Formation
