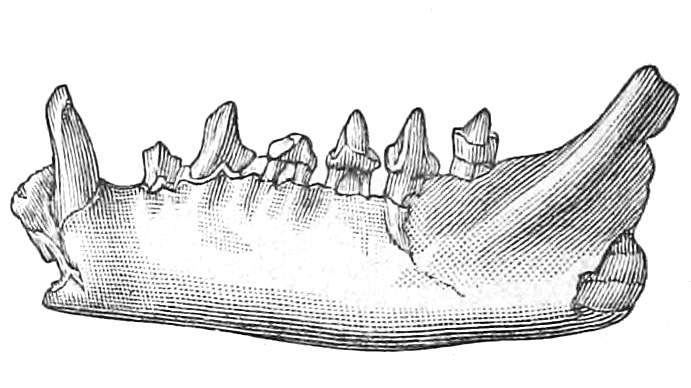

Scientific classification
- Kingdom: Animalia
- Phylum: Chordata
- Class: Mammalia
- Order: †Dryolestida
- Family: †Paurodontidae
- Genus: †Paurodon; Marsh, 1887
- Species: †P. valens

Binomial name
- †Paurodon valens Marsh, 1887

Synonyms
- Archaeotrigon Simpson, 1927; Pelicopsis Simpson, 1927; Araeodon Simpson, 1937; Foxraptor Bakker and Carpenter, 1990

= Paurodon =

Paurodon Temporal range: Late Jurassic Kimmeridgian–Tithonian

Extinct family of mammals

Paurodon is an extinct genus of Late Jurassic mammal from the Morrison Formation of the Western United States.

== Taxonomy ==
Paurodon is the type genus of the dryolestidan group Paurodontidae. Araeodon, Archaeotrigon, Foxraptor, and Pelicopsis are apparently growth stages of Paurodon.

== Distribution and stratigraphy ==
Remains of Paurodon have been found in stratigraphic zone 5 of the Morrison Formation in Como Bluff, Wyoming.

== Biology ==
Paurodon was strongly convergent with modern golden moles in terms of dentition and jaw shape. This suggests that its diet was composed of earthworms (unlike other contemporary dryolestidans, which were more insectivorous).

== See also ==
- Prehistoric mammal
  - List of prehistoric mammals
- Paleobiota of the Morrison Formation
