= Fossil Cabin =

Coordinates: 41°51′54″N 106°04′24″W

- Fossil Cabin, The
- U.S. National Register of Historic Places
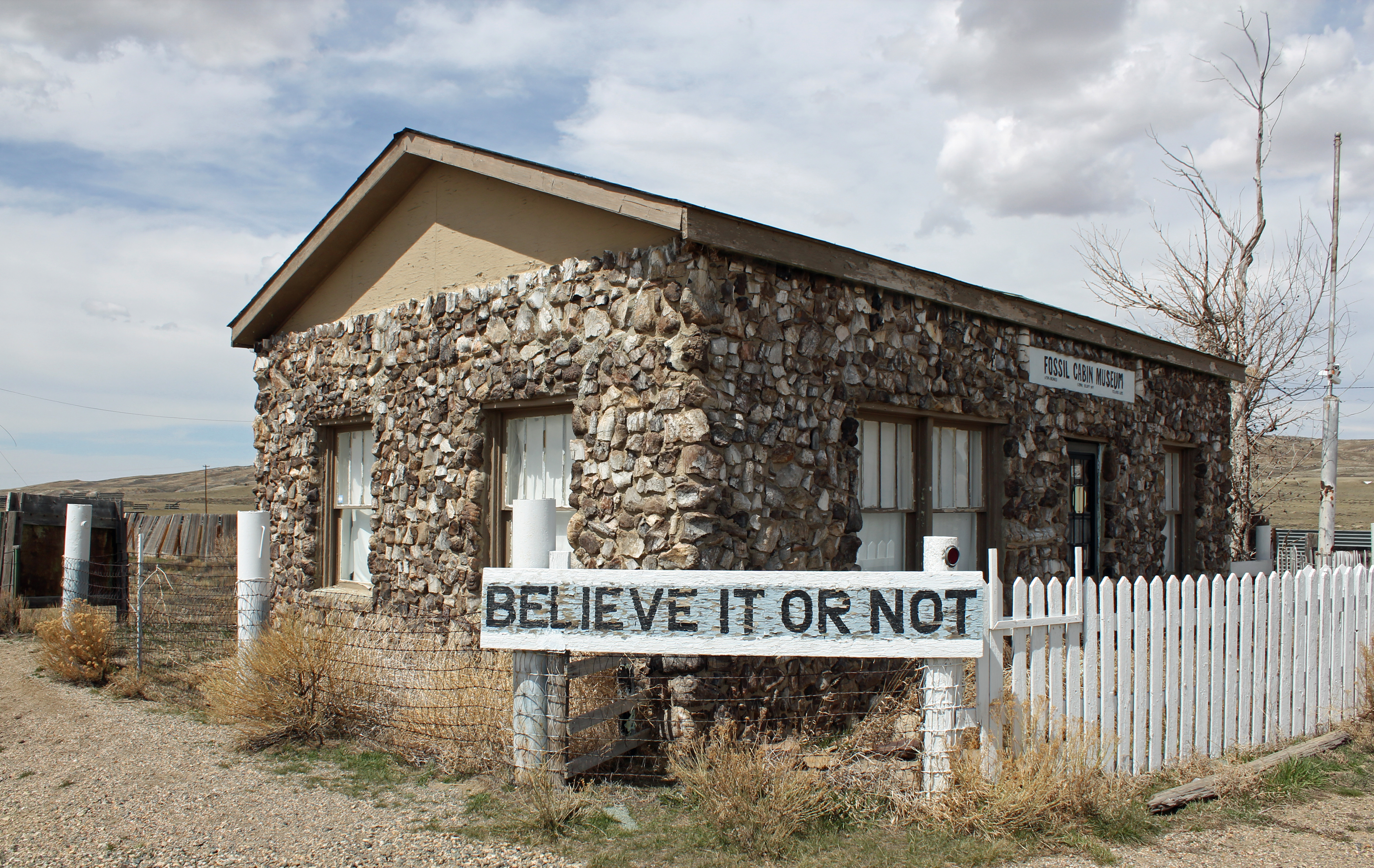
- The cabin in 2014.

- Location within Wyoming Location within the United States
- Location: US 30, Medicine Bow, Wyoming
- Built: 1932
- Architect: Boylan, Thomas
- NRHP reference No.: 08000289
- Added to NRHP: April 11, 2008

The Fossil Cabin near Medicine Bow, Wyoming, United States, was built in 1932 as a roadside attraction. The cabin is built of dinosaur bones excavated at nearby Como Bluff, using a total of 5,796 bones. The cabin was built as part of a gasoline filling station along US 30 by Thomas Boylan. Boylan had come from California to homestead in Wyoming and had been collecting bones for seventeen years, intending to create sculptures of dinosaurs in front of his house and gas station along the Lincoln Highway.

Thomas Boylan was born in Humboldt County, California, in 1863. He arrived in Wyoming in 1892, working for sheep ranching operations until 1904, when he switched to cattle. Boylan filed for a homestead near Como Bluff in 1908, where extensive deposits of fossilized dinosaur bones had been discovered in the 1870s. His 5,796 bones weighed 102,116 pounds (46,319 kg). Initially intending to erect a complete skeleton, Boylan was daunted by the task, as well as the likelihood that few of the bones came from the same animal, or even the same species. Boylan, with the help of his son, built the 29-foot (8.8 m) by 19-foot (5.8 m) cabin in 1932 for the 1933 tourist season. By 1936 Boylan had postcards printed, calling it the "Como Bluff Dinosaurium." In 1938 the cabin was promoted in Ripley's Believe It or Not as "The World's Oldest Cabin", although many common rock formations predate the era of dinosaurs. After the Ripley mention, Boylan also called the cabin the "Creation Museum" and "The Building that Used to Walk."

Boylan died in 1947. Operated by his widow, Grace, the gas station continued until the 1960s, when the construction of Interstate 80 caused a fall-off in traffic on Route 30. Grace sold the property in 1974. The cabin has since been offered for sale. One potential buyer has proposed moving the cabin to North Carolina for display.

The Fossil Cabin was listed on the National Register of Historic Places in 2008.
