= Schillerosaurus =

Schillerosaurus Temporal range: Late Jurassic, 155.7–145.5 Ma

Scientific classification
- Kingdom: Animalia
- Phylum: Chordata
- Class: Reptilia
- Order: Squamata
- Infraorder: Scincomorpha
- Genus: †Schillerosaurus; Nydam, Chure, and Evans, 2013

Type species
- †Schillerosaurus utahensis (Evans and Chure, 1999)

Synonyms
- Schilleria Evans and Chure, 1999

Extinct genus of lizards

Schillerosaurus is an extinct genus of lizard known from the Late Jurassic Morrison Formation of Western North America Described based on a partial skeleton from Dinosaur National Monument by Susan Evans and Dan Chure in 1999 as Schilleria utahensis, its name was subsequently changed to Schillerosaurus due to the former name already being occupied by a modern-day arachnid subgenus.

Other than it belonging to the infraorder scincomorpha, its further relations are unknown. It is thought to have been an insectivore like most of its modern relatives due to their morphological similarities. Possibly present in stratigraphic zone 5.

== See also ==
- Paleobiota of the Morrison Formation
