= Comobatrachus =

Comobatrachus Temporal range: Late Jurassic, 156.3–146.8 Ma

Scientific classification
- Domain: Eukaryota
- Kingdom: Animalia
- Phylum: Chordata
- Class: Amphibia
- Order: Anura
- Genus: †Comobatrachus; Estes & Hecht, 1960

Type species
- †Comobatrachus aenigmatis Estes & Hecht, 1960

Synonyms
- †Comobatrachus aenigmaticus (sic)

Genus of amphibians

Comobatrachus (meaning "Como Bluff frog") is a dubious genus of extinct frog known only from the holotype, YPM 1863, part of the right humerus, found in Reed's Quarry 9 near Como Bluff, Wyoming in the Late Jurassic-aged Morrison Formation. The holotype was commented on but not described by Moodie in 1912, although it was probably discovered alongside the holotype of Eobatrachus, but was not described by Othniel Charles Marsh when he named Eobatrachus in 1887. The type, and only species, C. aenigmatis, was named and described in 1960. It was probably related to the contemporaneous Eobatrachus.
