= Amphidon =

Amphidon Temporal range: Late Jurassic

Scientific classification
- Domain: Eukaryota
- Kingdom: Animalia
- Phylum: Chordata
- Class: Mammalia
- Order: †Eutriconodonta
- Family: †Amphidontidae
- Genus: †Amphidon; Simpson, 1925

Type species
- Amphidon superstes Simpson, 1925

Species
- A. superstes Simpson, 1925; A. aequicrurius Simpson, 1925

Synonyms
- Amphiodon

Genus of mammals

Amphidon is an extinct genus of Late Jurassic mammal from the Morrison Formation. It is present in stratigraphic zone five. Two species have been named in the genus: Amphidon superstes and Amphidon aequicrurius, by Simpson in 1925.

== See also ==
- Prehistoric mammal
  - List of prehistoric mammals
- Paleobiota of the Morrison Formation
