= Comonecturoides =

Comonecturoides Temporal range: Late Jurassic, Kimmeridgian–Tithonian

Scientific classification
- Domain: Eukaryota
- Kingdom: Animalia
- Phylum: Chordata
- Class: Amphibia
- Clade: Caudata
- Genus: †Comonecturoides; Hecht & Estes, 1960

Type species
- †Comonecturoides marshi Hecht & Estes, 1960

Extinct genus of amphibians

Comonecturoides is an extinct genus of prehistoric caudate amphibians, possibly a salamander, from Reed's Quarry 9 of the Morrison Formation, near Como Bluff, Wyoming; the type species is C. marshi. It is considered a nomen dubium because the name is based on non-distinctive remains which cannot be classified in detail.

== See also ==
- Prehistoric amphibian
- List of prehistoric amphibians
