= Aploconodon =

Aploconodon Temporal range: Late Jurassic

Scientific classification
- Domain: Eukaryota
- Kingdom: Animalia
- Phylum: Chordata
- Class: Mammalia
- Order: †Eutriconodonta
- Family: †Amphidontidae
- Genus: †Aploconodon; Simpson, 1925
- Species: †A. comoensis

Binomial name
- †Aploconodon comoensis Simpson, 1925

Extinct genus of mammals

Aploconodon is an extinct genus of Late Jurassic mammals belonging to the family Amphidontidae. It contains one species, A. comoensis.

It is present in stratigraphic zone 5 of the Morrison Formation.

== See also ==
- List of prehistoric mammals
- Paleobiota of the Morrison Formation
