= Euthlastus =

Euthlastus Temporal range: Late Jurassic Kimmeridgian–Tithonian

Scientific classification
- Domain: Eukaryota
- Kingdom: Animalia
- Phylum: Chordata
- Class: Mammalia
- Order: †Dryolestida
- Family: †Paurodontidae
- Genus: †Euthlastus; Simpson, 1929
- Species: †E. cordiformis

Binomial name
- †Euthlastus cordiformis Simpson, 1929

Extinct family of mammals

Euthlastus is an extinct genus of Late Jurassic (Kimmeridgian - Tithonian) mammal from the Morrison Formation. Present in stratigraphic zones 5 and 6. It is represented by only five upper molars.

== See also ==
- Prehistoric mammal
  - List of prehistoric mammals
- Paleobiota of the Morrison Formation
