= Laopteryx =

Laopteryx Temporal range: Late Jurassic

Scientific classification
- Kingdom: Animalia
- Phylum: Chordata
- Class: Reptilia
- Order: †Pterosauria
- Genus: †Laopteryx; Marsh, 1881
- Species: †L. prisca

Binomial name
- †Laopteryx prisca Marsh, 1881

Extinct species of reptile

Laopteryx is the name assigned to a pterosaur (flying reptile) from the Upper Jurassic Morrison Formation of Wyoming, United States; it was originally thought to be a bird.

The genus was named in 1881 by Othniel Charles Marsh. The generic name is derived from Greek laas, "stone", and pteryx, "wing". The full species name given by Marsh was Laopteryx priscum; the specific name meaning "of venerable age" in Latin. However, Marsh incorrectly used the neuter form, while pteryx is feminine in Greek. (See grammatical gender.) This was in the 19th century emended to an, also incorrect, masculine priscus and in 1971 by Pierce Brodkorb to prisca.

A partial skull, holotype YPM 1800, was discovered in Quarry 9 at Como Bluff. It consists of a piece from the hind portion of the cranium. There is also a single tooth, found near the skull and referred to the type. Marsh identified it as a bird, about the size of a heron, of the family Archaeopterygidae within the Odontornithes. As such it would have been one of the oldest known and the only one of that age then discovered in America. Only a century later would another possible Archaeopteryx - type bird be described from North America: Palaeopteryx, also from the Upper Jurassic of the US. This has been identified as a dinosaur but may more precisely have been an archaeopterygid; however, all that can be told from the single known specimen is that it was probably a more general eumaniraptoran. The fossil record of Mesozoic birds mainly consists of Eurasian rather than American Laurasian forms.

During most of the 20th century the identification by Marsh was generally doubted but the limited remains generated little interest. In 1986 however, the fossil was restudied by John Ostrom who concluded that Laopteryx was a pterosaur. There were some indications it belonged to the Pterodactyloidea but Ostrom, in view of the lack of information, limited his determination to a more general Pterosauria incertae sedis. Of the tooth he thought it likely belonged to some crocodylomorph. The name is also regarded as a nomen dubium, because the fragmentary remains are not sufficiently diagnostic to refer future other fossils to it.

== See also ==
- List of pterosaur genera
- Timeline of pterosaur research
