= Comodactylus =

Comodactylus Temporal range: Late Jurassic, 155 Ma

Scientific classification
- Kingdom: Animalia
- Phylum: Chordata
- Class: Reptilia
- Order: †Pterosauria
- Genus: †Comodactylus; Galton, 1981
- Species: †C. ostromi

Binomial name
- †Comodactylus ostromi Galton, 1981

Extinct genus of reptiles

Comodactylus is a genus of "rhamphorhynchoid" pterosaur from the Kimmeridgian-Tithonian-age Upper Jurassic Morrison Formation of Wyoming, United States, named for a single wing metacarpal.

In 1879 collector William Harlow Reed sent some fossil material he had excavated at Como Bluff in Quarry N° 9, or the "Mammal Quarry", to his employer Professor Othniel Charles Marsh at New Haven. Among it was the bone of a pterosaur that was subsequently filed, stored and forgotten.

In 1981 Peter Galton erected the genus Comodactylus based on this bone. The type species is Comodactylus ostromi. The genus name is derived from Como Bluff and Greek daktylos, meaning "finger", referring to the dramatically extended wing finger that is unique to pterosaurs. The specific name honors John Ostrom.

The holotype is YPM 9150, consisting of an intact fourth metacarpal measuring 57.5 millimeters (2.26 in) long. This holotype is the only known material from the animal. The metacarpal is quite robust, with the proximal end being very expanded. Such proportions are typical for basal pterosaurs such as Rhamphorhynchus, suggesting Comodactylus was not a member of the advanced Pterodactyloidea. However, assigning it to a pterosaur clade beyond the paraphyletic group "Rhamphorhynchoidea" has proven difficult due to a lack of diagnostic material. In 1989, James Jensen and Kevin Padian considered Comodactylus a nomen dubium. David Unwin in 1993 suggested an affinity with Nesodactylus.

The wingspan has been estimated at 2.5 meters (8.2 ft), exceptionally large for a pterosaur not belonging to the Pterodactyloidea. Comodactylus was also the first non-pterodactyloid pterosaur that was found in the Americas.

== See also ==
- List of pterosaur genera
- Timeline of pterosaur research
