= Diplosaurus =

Scientific classification
- Kingdom: Animalia
- Phylum: Chordata
- Class: Reptilia
- Clade: Pseudosuchia
- Clade: Crocodylomorpha
- Family: †Goniopholididae
- Genus: †Diplosaurus; Marsh, 1877

Species
- D. felix Marsh, 1877 (type); D. vebbii (Cope 1874) Marsh, 1877; "D. nanus" Marsh, 1895 (nomen dubium)

Extinct genus of reptiles

Diplosaurus is an extinct genus of goniopholidid mesoeucrocodylian. Fossils have been found from the Western United States and range from Late Jurassic to Early Cretaceous in age. The genus was first named and described in a paper written in 1877 by Othniel Charles Marsh.

== Discovery and etymology ==
The generic name, derived from Greek διπλόος, diploos, "double", probably refers to the "biconcave vertebrae" Marsh mentions as a distinctive trait compared to modern forms. The type species is Diplosaurus felix. The species was named on a heavily eroded skull roof and several postcranial elements, including a partial humerus, though the fossils have yet to be properly diagnosed. The fossils had been collected the same year by Benjamin Franklin Mudge and others during a Yale expedition to Morrison, Colorado, one of the first dinosaur-bearing battle grounds of Othniel Marsh’s competition with Edward Drinker Cope. In 1890 Karl Alfred von Zittel recombined this with Goniopholis into a Goniopholis felix, but today this is generally rejected.

Along with D. felix (sometimes misspelled D. felise), a second species of Diplosaurus was constructed in 1877 by Marsh after he recombined Hyposaurus vebbii, named by Edward Drinker Cope in 1874, with Diplosaurus into a new combination, Diplosaurus vebbii. Cope had named the species on a vertebra collected by Kansas railway worker and politician William C. Webb in 1871, though the fossil has since been lost. The fossil was even reported on in the newspaper Harpers Monthly and described as an 2.4 to 3.0 m (8 to 10 ft) long crocodilian. D. nanus was named by Marsh in 1895 based on a right humerus but is now considered to be a nomen dubium. The humerus had been collected by Marsh earlier in 1870 in the older Sundance Formation deposits in the Green River Basin of Utah.
