= Comodon =

Comodon Temporal range: Late Jurassic

Scientific classification
- Kingdom: Animalia
- Phylum: Chordata
- Class: Mammalia
- Order: †Eutriconodonta
- Family: †Amphidontidae
- Genus: †Comodon; Kretszoi and Kretzoi, 2000

Species
- C. gidleyi (Simpson, 1925) (type)

Extinct family of mammals

Comodon is an extinct genus of Late Jurassic mammal from the Morrison Formation of Wyoming. Fossils of this taxon are present in stratigraphic zone 5.

== Systematics ==
Comodon was originally named Phascolodon by Simpson (1925) for USNM 2703, a mandible from Quarry 9 in Como Bluff, Wyoming. However, the name Phascolodon was already in use for a ciliophore described in 1859, and the replacement name Comodon ("tooth from Como Bluff") was erected by Kretzoi & Kretzoi (2000). Meanwhile, Cifelli & Dykes (2001) coined the replacement name Phascolotheridium for Phascolodon, unaware of the paper by Kretzoi and Kretzoi (2000).

== See also ==
- Prehistoric mammal
  - List of prehistoric mammals
- Paleobiota of the Morrison Formation
