= Tathiodon =

Tathiodon Temporal range: Late Jurassic Kimmeridgian–Tithonian

Scientific classification
- Domain: Eukaryota
- Kingdom: Animalia
- Phylum: Chordata
- Class: Mammalia
- Order: †Dryolestida
- Family: †Paurodontidae
- Genus: †Tathiodon; Simpson, 1927
- Species: †T. agilis

Binomial name
- †Tathiodon agilis (Simpson, 1927 [originally Tanaodon])

Synonyms
- Tanaodon agilis Simpson, 1927

Extinct family of mammals

Tathiodon is an extinct genus of Late Jurassic (Kimmeridgian - Tithonian) mammal from the Morrison Formation. Present in stratigraphic zone 5.

== See also ==
- Paleobiota of the Morrison Formation
