= Tektonargus =

Trace fossil classification
- Domain: Eukaryota
- Kingdom: Animalia
- Phylum: Arthropoda
- Class: Insecta
- Ichnogenus: †Tektonargus; Hasiotis, Kirkland, Windscheffel & Safris, 1998

Trace fossil

Tektonargus is a trace fossil ichnotaxon genus of insect, from the Late Jurassic period.

It was discovered in a section of the Morrison Formation, located in Colorado, western North America. The name Tektonargus comes from the Greek word tēkton meaning artisan/craftsman and the Greek word argus referring to the mythological giant Argus Panoptes, who was all-seeing. It appears to have been created by a caddisfly.

== See also ==
- Morrison fauna
