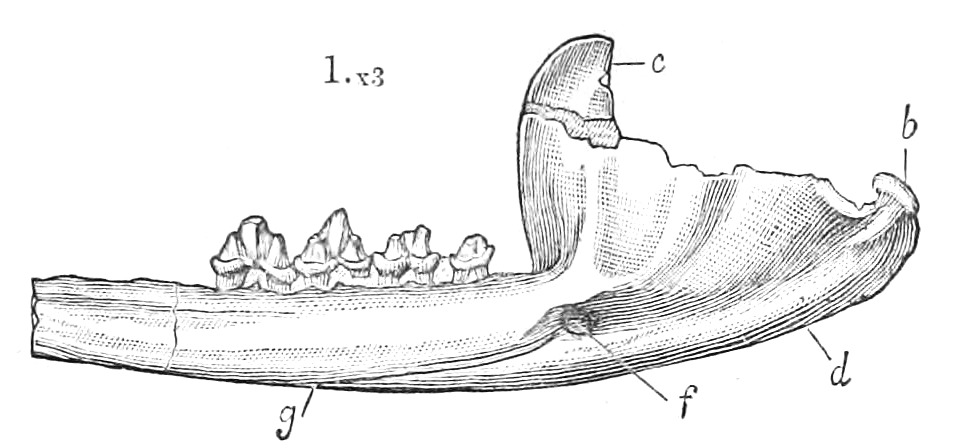
- Illustration of the lower jaw of Tinodon bellus, created by Othniel Charles Marsh

Scientific classification
- Kingdom: Animalia
- Phylum: Chordata
- Class: Mammalia
- Family: †Tinodontidae
- Genus: †Tinodon; Marsh, 1879

Type species
- †Tinodon bellus Marsh, 1879

Other species
- † T. micron Ensom & Sigogneau-Russell, 2000

Synonyms
- Eurylambda Simpson, 1929; Menacodon Marsh, 1887

= Tinodon =

Tinodon Temporal range: Kimmeridgian – Berriasian 154.8–143.1 Ma

Extinct genus of mammals

Tinodon is an extinct genus of mammal. First described by the paleontologist Othniel Charles Marsh, it contains two recognized species: Tinodon bellus and T. micron. It is known from jaw and dental remains. Its taxonomic placement within the mammalian lineage remains uncertain, having been variously placed within and outside of the crown group Mammalia. It lived from the Late Jurassic to the Early Cretaceous, found in both North America and Europe. Its known habitats are believed to have ranged from semi-arid to arid.

== History of discovery ==
The genus Tinodon was described by American paleontologist Othniel Charles Marsh in 1879, from remains found in the "Jurassic beds of the Rocky Mountains" (now known as the Morrison Formation). In 1887, he assigned the genus to the new family Tinodontidae. Marsh identified four species of Tinodon: T. bellus (the type species), T. ferox, T. robustus, and T. lepidus. The species T. ferox and T. robustus have since been moved to the genus Priacodon, while T. lepidus has been treated as a synonym of T. bellus. An additional species was described from teeth from England's Purbeck Group in 2000 by French paleontologist Denise Sigogneau-Russell and British geologist Paul Ensom. It was named T. micron. Another species was suggested by American paleontologists George Engelmann and George Callison in 1998, but it was left in open nomenclature. A tooth found by German paleontologist Georg Krusat in 1969 at the Lourinhã Formation in Portugal has been tentatively assigned to Tinodon, but the identity of the specimen remains uncertain.

== Description ==
=== Type species ===
Marsh described Tinodon from a single lower jaw. He remarked on its distinctiveness from other early mammals from the United States, saying it more closely resembled the English genus Triconodon. Both genera have three cusps (pointed cones) on each molar, but Tinodon differs in having four lower molar teeth instead of three. In Tinodon, the middle cone of each tooth is the largest, while in Triconodon, they are all about the same size. Marsh described the specimen's coronoid process (a bony projection found on mammalian jaws) as "striking". Its front edge forms a right angle with the ramus (an upward facing bony projection of the lower jaw). The jaw joint is only slightly above the level of the teeth. The eight posterior teeth together occupy 10 millimeters (0.39 in) of the jawline, while the length from the last molar to the end of the jawline is 9 millimeters (0.35 in). In a further study of the type specimen, South African paleontologist Alfred W. Crompton and American paleontologist Farish Jenkins observed that the teeth contained deeply incised facets (flat surfaces), representing a state of advanced wear.

Crompton and Jenkins also compared the teeth with the only known tooth (an upper molar) of Eurylambda, another genus of mammal from the Morrison Formation, and wrote that the molar outlines and corresponding wear patterns of both specimens made it "extremely probable" that the "Eurylambda" specimen simply represents an upper tooth of Tinodon. Another tooth of Eurylambda/Tinodon, a complete upper left molar, was later described by paleontologist Guillermo W. Rougier and colleagues. The discovery of the tooth, in better condition than the previous Eurylambda specimen, was significant because teeth of the upper jaws of fossil mammals are usually preserved more poorly than those of the lower jaw. The molar has three cusps, of which the paracone (the frontmost cusp) is by far the largest and highest, twice as high as the next highest cusp, the metacone (middle cusp). This, along with its shape, which is curved on one side and flat on the other, gives the paracone a conspicuous, hooklike shape. Based on their finding, they hypothesized that the main cusps formed a triangular shape, that the teeth were somewhat broad in the directions of the lips and tongue, and that the animal lacked a parastylar lobe (a specific cusp whose presence is believed to be specific to more modern mammal lineages). Based on these features, Rougier and colleagues concluded that the idea that Eurylambda is synonymous with Tinodon is likely correct.

=== Other species ===
Marsh described what he believed represented another species of the genus based on another, smaller lower jaw. The perceived differences included smaller teeth, the inner margin of the jaw being somewhat inflected, and the jaw joint being level with the base of the teeth rather than being above their crowns. American paleontologist George Gaylord Simpson wrote that Marsh's first observation was erroneous, as Marsh's own measurements had shown that the teeth of both specimens were the same size. Simpson further stated that while other differences did exist, they were slight. Polish paleobiologist Zofia Kielan-Jaworowska and colleagues declared the two species synonymous based on Simpson's observations, and further stated that it is likely that all Tinodon remains from the Morrison Formation belong to the species T. bellus.

The species T. micron was described on the basis of a handful of molars. The teeth differed from those of known specimens in their smaller size, the presence of labial cingula (ridges of enamel facing the lips), a less centrally acute lingual (facing the tongue) cingulum, and less steep angulation of the cusps. The researchers who described T. micron noted that some of the teeth could potentially belong to a species of the genus Spalacotherium instead; on the other hand, they stated that some of the teeth they assigned to Spalacotherium evansae could possibly belong to T. micron.

== Classification ==
The placement of Tinodon within the broader mammalian classification scheme is uncertain. In their 2004 book Mammals from the Age of the Dinosaurs, Kielan-Jaworowska et al. constructed multiple cladograms evaluating potential relationships among extinct mammals, one of which placed Tinodontidae in an unnamed clade consisting of the groups Allotheria, Eutriconodonta, and Trechnotheria. However, their results were not conclusive, and they ultimately designated Tinodontidae as incertae sedis within Mammalia. The family was later included in a 2010 study by Russian paleontologists Alexander Olegovich Averianov and Alexey Vladimirovich Lopatin that analyzed the relationships between various mammalian groups based on scientific consensus, which rejected the traditional idea that Mammalia could be divided into three subclasses (Prototheria, represented by living monotremes; Allotheria, containing the extinct multituberculates; and Theria). Instead, it placed all members of the crown group Mammalia within Trechnotheria, with Tinodontidae as its sister group. A similar 2014 consensus-based analysis by Chinese paleontologist Shundong Bi and colleagues contradicted the results of the 2010 study (without citing it directly) and reaffirmed the placement of Tinodon among crown mammals, specifically as a sister group to Allotheria. However, the paper's authors noted that this was inconsistent with its usual taxonomic placement (citing Kielan-Jaworowska et al.) and that its position was unstable. They suggested the possibility that this placement could indicate the development of allotherian teeth, such as those of Haramiyavia, from a simpler triangular cusp arrangement. Ultimately, they stated that more data would be needed to come to a more definitive conclusion.

== Paleoecology ==
In North America, Tinodon is known from the Morrison Formation, dated to the Late Jurassic (from the late Kimmeridgian to the early Tithonian). In Europe, it has been recorded from the Purbeck Group in Dorset, England, and possibly the Lourinhã Formation in Portugal, with both records dated to the Berriasian of the Early Cretaceous. Its Portuguese record is considered tentative, based on a single lower molar, with some of the specimen's features more closely resembling those of a spalacotheriid.

Besides Tinodon, the Morrison Formation has yielded remains of over a hundred species of vertebrates, including dinosaurs (such as Stegosaurus, Allosaurus, and Apatosaurus), crocodiles, turtles, frogs, salamanders, and other mammals. According to Kielan-Jaworowska et al., the entirety of the mammal assemblage of the Late Jurassic of North America comes from the Morrison Formation, which they described as the most diverse assemblage of mammals of its age anywhere in the world. The paleoclimate of the area is believed to have been semi-arid, with seasonal rainfall and subtropical westerly winds.

The mammals of the Purbeck Group, while somewhat similar to those of the Morrison Formation and traditionally believed to have been Late Jurassic in age, have been more recently suggested to come from the Berriasian of the Early Cretaceous. The Purbeck Group has been known for over a century for its fossiliferous limestone, which is believed to have been deposited in shallow water lagoons of varying salinity, from hypersaline to brackish to fresh. The area around the lagoons was dominated by the conifer Protocupressinoxylon purbeckensis. British paleobotanist and paleoclimatologist Jane Francis, whose doctoral dissertation was written on the fossil trees of the Purbeck Group, suggested that the shallow roots and sparse and waxy foliage of the trees were adapted for a climate with little rainfall and arid summers, similar to parts of modern-day North Africa. The forests are thought to have been subject to repeated flooding, leading to their encasement in algal stromatolites. British geologist John R. Underhill has attributed these events to movement along fault lines.

== See also ==
- List of prehistoric mammals
- Paleobiota of the Morrison Formation
