= Psalodon =

Psalodon Temporal range: Late Jurassic

Scientific classification
- Domain: Eukaryota
- Kingdom: Animalia
- Phylum: Chordata
- Class: Mammalia
- Order: †Multituberculata
- Family: †Allodontidae
- Genus: †Psalodon; Simpson, 1926

Species
- P. fortis (Marsh, 1887); P. marshi Simpson, 1929; P. potens (Marsh, 1887)

Extinct family of mammals

Psalodon is an extinct genus of North American mammal that lived during the Upper Jurassic period. It's a member of the family Allodontidae within the order Multituberculata.

== Biostratigraphy ==
Present in stratigraphic zones 2 and 5.

== Species ==
Psalodon fortis was named by Othniel Charles Marsh in 1887 and G. G. Simpson in 1927. It is also known as Allodon fortis (Marsh 1887). Remains have been found in the Upper Jurassic Morrison Formation of Wyoming (United States). The holotype is at the Peabody Museum of Natural History at Yale University.

Psalodon marshi was named by Simpson G.G. in 1929. All of the remains came from the Morrison Formation of Wyoming.

Psalodon potens was named by Marsh O.C. in 1887 and Simpson G.G. in 1927. It is also known as Ctenacodon potens (Marsh 1887). The remains assigned to this species were also found in the Morrison Formation of Wyoming and the holotype is also at Yale.
