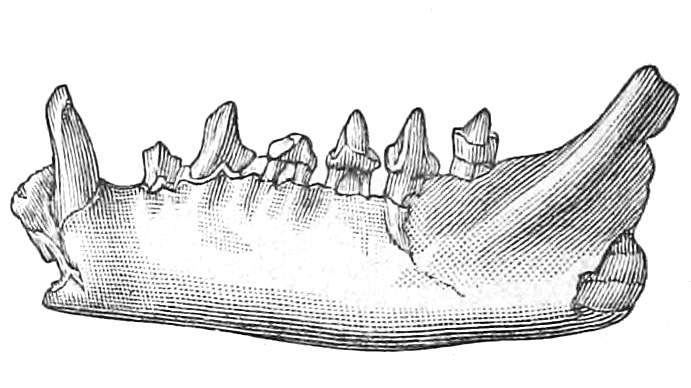
- Lower jaw of Paurodon valens from the Late Jurassic of North America

Scientific classification
- Kingdom: Animalia
- Phylum: Chordata
- Class: Mammalia
- Order: †Dryolestida
- Family: †Paurodontidae; Marsh, 1887

Genera
- †Brancatherulum?; †Comotherium; †Dorsetodon; †Drescheratherium; †Euthlastus; †Henkelotherium; †Paurodon; †Tathiodon

= Paurodontidae =

Paurodontidae Temporal range: Late Jurassic - Early Cretaceous Kimmeridgian–Berriasian

Extinct family of mammals

Paurodontidae is a family of Late Jurassic to Early Cretaceous mammals in the order Dryolestida. Remains of paurodontids have been found in the United States, Britain, Portugal, and Tanzania. The group likely represents a paraphyletic group of basal non dryolestid dryolestidans. Paurodon has been suggested to have been a specilast feeder on earthworms due to the morphology of its teeth closely resembling that of the golden mole genus Amblysomus.
