= Eobatrachus =

Eobatrachus Temporal range: Late Jurassic, 156.3–146.8 Ma

Scientific classification
- Kingdom: Animalia
- Phylum: Chordata
- Class: Amphibia
- Order: Anura
- Clade: Pipoidea
- Genus: †Eobatrachus; Marsh, 1887

Type species
- †Eobatrachus agilis Marsh, 1887

Genus of amphibians

Eobatrachus is a dubious genus of extinct frog known only from the holotype, YPM 1862, part of the right humerus, found in Reed's Quarry 9 near Como Bluff, Wyoming in the Late Jurassic-aged Morrison Formation. The type, and only species, E. agilis, was named by Othniel Charles Marsh in 1887 and he initially interpreted it as a mammal, although it was later re-classified as a genus of frog related to Comobatrachus and Eobatrachus is now seen as a dubious amphibian genus, possibly belonging to Anura (frogs) according to Foster (2007).

== See also ==
- List of prehistoric amphibians
