= Pantotheria =

Pantotheria Temporal range: Jurassic-Cretaceous

Scientific classification
- Kingdom: Animalia
- Phylum: Chordata
- Class: Mammalia
- Subclass: Theria
- Infraclass: Trituberculata
- Order: †Pantotheria Marsh, 1880

Obsolete taxon of mammals

Pantotheria is an abandoned taxon of Mesozoic mammals. This group is now considered an informal "wastebasket" taxon and has been replaced by Dryolestida as well as other groups. It is sometimes treated as an infraclass and older books refer to it as being related to symmetrodonts. One classification makes it an infraclass with a single order, Eupantotheria.

== Taxonomy ==
List of mammals that were at one time included in the group Pantotheria

- Genus †Tribactonodon bonfieldi Sigogneau-Russell, Hooker & Ensom 2001
- Genus †Paraungulatum rectangularis Bonaparte 1999
- Genus †Argaliatherium robustum Cifelli & Davis 2015
- Genus †Carinalestes murensis Cifelli & Davis 2015
- Genus †Hypomylos Sigogneau-Russell 1992
- Family †Picopsidae Fox 1980
  - Genus †Picopsis pattersoni Fox 1980
  - Genus †Tirotherium aptum Montellano-Ballesteros & Fox 2015
- Family †Casamiqueliidae Bonaparte 1999
  - Genus †Casamiquelia rionegrina Bonaparte 1990
  - Genus †Rougiertherium tricuspes Bonaparte 1999
  - Genus †Alamitherium bishopi Bonaparte 1999
- Family †Brandoniidae Bonaparte 1992
  - Genus †Brandonia intermedia Bonaparte 1992
- Family †Donodontidae Sigogneau-Russell 1991
  - Genus †Donodon presciptoris Sigogneau-Russell 1991
- Family †Paurodontidae Marsh 1887
  - Genus †Brancatherulum tendagurense Dietrich, 1927
  - Genus †Comotherium richi Prothero 1981
  - Genus †Dorsetodon haysomi Ensom & Sigogneau-Russell 1998
  - Genus †Drescheratherium acutum Krebs 1998
  - Genus †Euthlastus cordiformis Simpson 1927
  - Genus †Henkelotherium guimarotae Krebs 1991
  - Genus †Paurodon valens Marsh 1887
  - Genus †Tathiodon agilis (Simpson 1927) Simpson 1927 [Tanaodon Simpson 1927 non Kirk 1927; Tanaodon agilis Simpson 1927]
- Family †Vincelestidae Bonaparte 1986
  - Genus †Vincelestes neuquenianus Bonaparte 1986
- Order †Spalacotheriida Prothero 1981 [Spalacotheroidea Prothero 1981; Quirogatheria Bonaparte 1992]
  - Genus †Maotherium Rougier, Ji & Novacek 2003
    - †M. sinensis Rougier, Ji & Novacek 2003
    - †M. asiaticus Ji et al. 2009
  - Family †Thereuodontidae Sigogneau-Russell 1998
    - Genus †Thereuodon Sigogneau-Russell 1987
      - †T. dahmanii Sigogneau-Russell 1987
      - †T. taraktes Sigogneau-Russell & Ensom 1998
- Order †Meridiolestida Rougier, Apesteguia & Gaetano 2011
  - Genus †Leonardus cuspidatus Bonaparte 1990
  - Genus †Cronopio dentiacutus Rougier, Apesteguia & Gaetano 2011
  - Family †Necrolestidae Ameghino 1894
    - Genus †Necrolestes Ameghino 1894 sensu Rougier et al. 2012
      - †N. patagonensis Ameghino 1891
      - †N. mirabilis Goin et al. 2007
  - Family †Reigitheriidae Bonaparte 1990
    - Genus †Reigitherium bunodontum Bonaparte 1990
  - Family †Peligotheriidae Bonaparte, Van Valen & Kramartz 1993
    - Genus †Peligrotherium Bonaparte, Van Valen & Kramartz 1993
  - Family †Mesungulatidae Bonaparte 1986 sensu Rougier et al. 2009
    - Genus †Coloniatherium Rougier et al. 2009
    - Genus †Quirogatherium Bonaparte 1990
    - Genus †Mesungulatum Bonaparte & Soria 1985
- Order †Dryolestida Prothero 1981 sensu stricto Rougier et al. 2012
  - Family †Barbereniidae Bonaparte 1990
    - Genus †Barberenia Bonaparte 1990
      - †B. araujoae Bonaparte 1990
      - †B. allenensis Rougier et al. 2008
  - Family †Dryolestidae Marsh 1879
    - Genus †Anthracolestes Averianov, Martin & Lopatin 2014
    - Genus †Guimarotodus Martin 1999
    - Genus †Krebsotherium Martin 1999
    - Genus †Phascolestes Owen 1871
    - Genus †Lakotalestes luoi Cifelli, Davis & Sames 2014
    - Genus †Laolestes Simpson 1927
    - Genus †Achyrodon Owen 1871
    - Genus †Amblotherium Owen 1871
    - Genus †Dryolestes Marsh 1878
    - Genus †Portopinheirodon Martin 1999
    - Genus †Kurtodon Osborn 1887
    - Genus †Crusafontia Henkel & Krebs 1969
    - Genus †Groeberitherium Bonaparte 1986
- Order †Amphitheriida Prothero 1981
  - Family †Amphitheriidae Owen 1846
    - Genus †Amphibetulimus Lopatin & Averianov 2007
    - Genus †Amphitherium de Blainville 1838
- Order †Peramurida McKenna 1975
  - Family †Peramuridae Kretzoi 1946
    - Genus †Kiyatherium cardiodens Maschenko, Lopatin & Voronkevich 2002
    - Genus †Tendagurutherium dietrichi Heinrich 1998
    - Genus †Peramuroides tenuiscus Davis 2012
    - Genus †Kouriogenys minor (Owen 1871) Davis 2012 [Spalacotherium minus Owen 1871]
    - Genus †Peramus Owen 1871
    - Genus †Palaeoxonodon Freeman 1976
    - Genus †Abelodon Brunet et al. 1991
    - Genus †Pocamus Canudo & Cuenca-Bescós 1996
