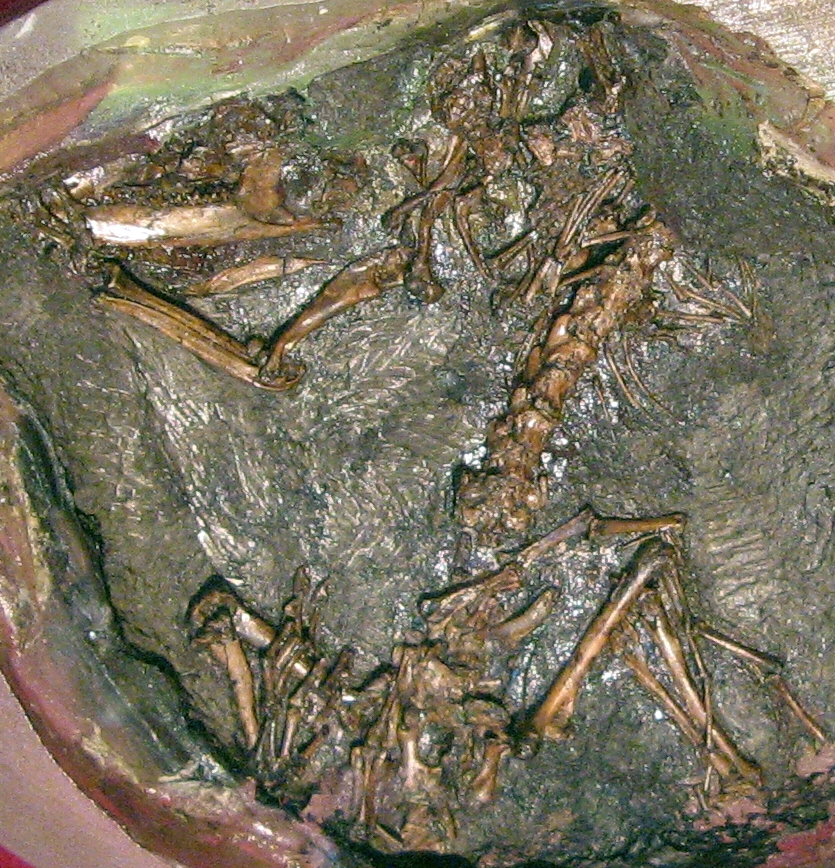
- Skeleton

Scientific classification
- Kingdom: Animalia
- Phylum: Chordata
- Class: Mammalia
- Order: †Dryolestida
- Genus: †Henkelotherium; Krebs, 1991
- Species: †H. guimarotae

Binomial name
- †Henkelotherium guimarotae Krebs, 1991

= Henkelotherium =

Henkelotherium Temporal range: Late Jurassic, Kimmeridgian

Extinct family of mammals

Henkelotherium is an extinct genus of dryolestidan mammal from the Late Jurassic (Kimmeridgian) Camadas de Guimarota, in Portugal. Unlike many other Jurassic mammals, it is known from a largely complete skeleton, and is thought to have had an arboreal lifestyle.

== Description ==
The skull of Henkelotherium is 4 cm (1.6 in) long, and presacral body length is 11 cm (4.3 in). This suggest a weight of about 20 g (0.71 oz).

== Paleobiology ==
Primitive characters of Henkelotherium (e.g. asymmetric condyles of the femur) indicate that this species had a mode of locomotion similar to tree shrews and opossums. The small size of Henkelotherium and elongated tail made it suited to an arboreal lifestyle and capable of climbing trees, a notion supported by the paleoecological reconstruction of the Guimarota ecosystem indicating a densely vegetated environment. Based on its late growth of jaws and it possessing additional molars that erupted after antemolar replacement was completed, Henkelotherium is believed to have had a long lifespan, a slower life history, or a combination of the two.

== Taxonomy ==
In cladistic analyses, Henkelotherium has been considered closely related to Dryolestidae, either as a part of that group, or as closely related but placed outside that family as a non-dryolestid dryolestidan.

- Cladotheria
  - Meridiolestida
  - - Dryolestida
      - - - Anthracolestes
          - Tathiodon
        - - Euthlastus
          - Paurodon
      - - Drescheratherium
        - Henkelotherium
        - Dryolestidae
          - Amblotherium
          - - - Dryolestes
              - Laolestes
            - - - Krebsotherium
                - Thereuodon
              - - Guimarotodus
                - - Crusafontia
                  - Hercynodon
    - - Donodontidae
      - Prototribosphenida
        - Vincelestes
        - - Amphitherium
          - - - Amphibetulimus
              - Nanolestes
            - - Palaeoxonodon
              - Zatheria
                - - Arguimus
                  - Peramus
                - Tribosphenida

== See also ==
- Prehistoric mammal
  - List of prehistoric mammals
