= Ksar Metlili Formation =

Geological formation in Morocco

- Stratigraphic range: Late Tithonian to Early Berriasian
- Type: Geological formation
- Unit of: Moroccan Red Beds
- Underlies: Dekkar Group
- Overlies: Anoual Formation
- Thickness: ~80 m (260 ft)

Lithology
- Primary: Mudstone, sandstone
- Other: Limestone, marl, calcarenite

Location
- Coordinates: 32.7°N 3.1°W
- Approximate paleocoordinates: 25.1°N 1.9°E
- Region: Figuig Province
- Country: Morocco
- Extent: High Atlas

Type section
- Named for: Ksar Met Lili Fort
- Ksar Metlili Formation (Morocco)

The Ksar Metlili Formation is a geological formation in eastern High Atlas of Morocco. It is late Tithonian to Berriasian in age. It is approximately 80 metres (260 ft) thick and primarily consists of mudstone and sandstone, with thin calcareous beds. One of these calcareous beds near the middle of the sequence is an important microvertebrate locality. Subsequent to the original site, several other localities have been sampled. The depositional environment is thought to be near shore deltaic.

== Fossil content ==
=== Fish ===
| Genus | Species | Location | Material | Notes | Images |
|---|---|---|---|---|---|
| Cypriniformes indet. | Indeterminate | Ksar Metlili | Teeth | Bony Fish | |
| Egertonodus | E. basanus | Ksar Metlili | 16 isolated Teeth; KM-A2-26, teeth; KM-D1-22, teeth; KM-D2-25, tooth | Hybodontid | |
| Ginglymodi indet. | Indeterminate | Ksar Metlili | KM-A1-41, fin rays; KM-A1-42, teeth; 46, scales; 47, scale; 49, scales; 50, scales; KM-B'-58 and 60, 66, all ichthyoliths; KM-B'-59, 61, 64-65, 72, 84, all scales; KM-A2-22, mandibular fragments; KM-A2-23, 27, both scales; 32. teeth; KM-C-6, mandibular fragments; KM-C-7, scales; 9, teeth; KM-D1-21, teeth; KM-D2-30, teeth | Bony Fish | |
| Hybodus? | sp. | Ksar Metlili | Teeth | Hybodontid | Reconstruction of Hybodus |
| Lepidotes? | sp. | Ksar Metlili | Teeth | Lepidotidae | Reconstruction of Lepidotes |
| Lonchidion | L. (Lissodus) marocensis | Ksar Metlili | MCM108, isolated tooth | Lonchidiid | |
| Mawsoniidae indet. | Indeterminate | Ksar Metlili | KM-A2-11, left postparietal shield | Coelacanth | |
| Osteoglossiformes indet. | Indeterminate | Ksar Metlili | KM-B'-89, teeth | Bony Fish | |
| Polyacrodus | sp. | Ksar Metlili | Teeth | Polyacrodontid | |
| Ptychoceratodontidae indet. | Indeterminate | Ksar Metlili | KM-B'-56, teeth; KM-A2-24, teeth; KM-D1-20, teeth; KM-D2-22, teeth; KM-D2-22, tooth | Lungfish | |
| Pycnodontidae indet. | Indeterminate | Ksar Metlili | KM-A1-58, teeth; KM-A2-25, tooth; KM-D1-23, teeth | Pycnodontiform | |
| Semionotidae indet. | Indeterminate | Ksar Metlili | Teeth | Bony Fish | |
| ?Siluriformes/?Polypteriformes indet. | Indeterminate | Ksar Metlili | KM-A1-40, fin spine; KM-B'-57, fin spine; KM-D1-19, fin spines | Bony Fish | |

=== Amphibians ===
| Genus | Species | Location | Material | Notes | Images |
|---|---|---|---|---|---|
| Alytidae indet. | Indeterminate | Ksar Metlili | KM-B'-18, dorsal vertebrae | Toad | |
| Anoualerpeton | A. unicus | Ksar Metlili | Right premaxilla (Holotype); KM-B'-12-13, left dentary; KM-A2-7, fused frontals; KM-A2-31, dentary; KM-D2-28, fragmentary dentary | Albanerpetontid | Holotype |
| Anura indet. | Indeterminate | Ksar Metlili | MCM 70-72, 74-76, 88-92, 97-99; KM-B'-15, right ilium; 16, scapula; 17, dorsal vertebrae; 27, dorsal vertebrae of a hatchling or neotenic; 86, long bone fragments; KM-A2-2, radioulna; KM-A2-3, coracoid; 4, femur; 5, scapula; 29, long bones; KM-D1-25, long bones | Frogs | |
| Aygroua | A. anoualensis | Ksar Metlili | MCM 183 - holotype (proximal part of right ilium); MCM 57, 61, 67-69, 77, 81-82, 85-86, 95-96, 208-210(ilia, premaxilla, maxillae, atlantes, sacral vertebra, presacral vertebrae, scapulae) | Frog | |
| Enneabatrachus | aff.sp. | Ksar Metlili | ACMC60, left illium | Discoglossid Frog | |
| Rubricacaecilia | R. monbaroni | Ksar Metlili | Nearly complete right pseudodentary, partial left pseudodentaries, partial right pseudangular, partial palatine, atlas, postcranial vertebrae | Stem-caecilian | Holotype |

=== Lepidosaurs ===
| Genus | Species | Location | Material | Notes | Images |
|---|---|---|---|---|---|
| Lacertilia indet. | Indeterminate | Ksar Metlili | Teeth | Lizard | |
| Paramacellodus | P. marocensis | Ksar Metlili | MCM 116 (holotype), left dentary with 12 teeth; MCM 117, fragment of right dentary; MCM 118, fragment of left dentary with 3 teeth | Paramacellodidae Lizard | |
| Paramacellodidae indet. | Indeterminate | Ksar Metlili | Teeth | Lizard | |
| Scincomorpha indet. | Indeterminate | Ksar Metlili | KM-A1-7, left dentary (fragmentary); KM-B'-19, right dentary | Lizard | |
| Squamata indet. | Indeterminate | Ksar Metlili | KM-A1-5, dorsal vertebra; KM-A1-6, humerus, 8, dorsal vertebra; KM-B'-28, dorsal vertebrae; 29, jaw fragment; 90, 92, single teeth; KM-A2-6, right dentary; KM-A2-28, long bones; KM-D1-5, dorsal vertebra; KM-D1-26, vertebrae; KM-D2-27, "diverse elements" | Lizard? | |
| Sphenodontia indet. | Indeterminate | Ksar Metlili | "Sphenodontian B", teeth; KM-B'-14, dorsal vertebra | Distinct from Tingitana | |
| Tarratosaurus | T. anoualensis | Ksar Metlili | MNHN MCM 140; KM-B'-20, right dentary | Lizard | |
| Tingitana | T. anoualae | Ksar Metlili | MCM 120, a mandible | Sphenodontid | |

=== Turtles ===
| Genus | Species | Location | Material | Notes | Images |
|---|---|---|---|---|---|
| Araripemydidae indet. | Indeterminate | Ksar Metlili | Isolated Plastrons | Pelomedusoide Turtle | |
| Cryptodira indet. | Indeterminate | Ksar Metlili | Isolated Plastrons | Turtle | |
| Pleurodira indet. | Indeterminate | Ksar Metlili | Isolated Plastrons | Turtle | |
| Taquetochelys | sp. | Ksar Metlili | Isolated Plastrons | An Araripemydid turtle | |
| Testudinata indet. | Indeterminate | Ksar Metlili | KM-A1-18, osteoderms; KM-A1-20 to 24, osteoderms; KM-B'-39, 41, osteoderms; KM-A2-14 osteoderms; KM-D1-10, osteoderms; KM-D2-13, osteoderms; Mo-GR.23-002, bone fragment | Turtle | |

=== Choristoderes ===
| Genus | Species | Location | Material | Notes | Images |
|---|---|---|---|---|---|
| Choristodera indet. | Indeterminate | Ksar Metlili | KM-A1-19, dorsal vertebra; KM-D1-18, vertebrae; KM-D2-23 and -26; KM-B'-49, dorsal vertebrae | Similar to Cteniogenys | |

=== Crocodylomorpha ===
| Genus | Species | Location | Material | Notes | Images |
|---|---|---|---|---|---|
| Atoposauridae indet. | Indeterminate | Ksar Metlili | KM-B'-47, 48, A1-28, 29, 34, all teeth; KM-A2-18, teeth; KM-C-2, tooth; KM-D1-17, teeth; KM-D2-14, -15 and -18, teeth; -19, tooth | Crocodrylomorph | |
| Goniopholididae/Pholidosauridae indet. | Indeterminate | Ksar Metlili | Mo-GR.23-001, Postcranial elements & osteoderms; Mo-GR.23-001, complete skull | Crocodrylomorph | |
| Crocodylomorpha indet. | Indeterminate | Ksar Metlili | KM-B'-40, KM-A1-25, KM-A2-13, osteoderms; KM-B'-45, mandibular fragment; 46, 52, 91, A1-26, 27, 30 to 33, 35; KM-A2-15 to 17, 20 all teeth; KM-D1-7 and 8, both single teeth; KM-D1-11, osteoderms; 12, dorsal vertebra; 13, scapula/coracoid; 14-16, all teeth; KM-D2-12, osteoderms; KM-D2-16, teeth; -20, tooth | Crocodrylomorph | |
| Teleosauridae indet. | Indeterminate | Ksar Metlili | KM-B'-51, teeth; KM-B'-53, tooth; KM-A1-53, tooth; KM-A2-30, tooth; KM-C-5, teeth; KM-C-8, tooth; KM-D2-29, teeth | Marine Crocodrylomorph | |
| Theriosuchus | Cf.T. sp. | Ksar Metlili | KM-B'-42, premaxillary | An Atoposaurid | |

=== Pterosaurs ===
| Genus | Species | Location | Material | Notes | Images |
|---|---|---|---|---|---|
| Ctenochasmatidae indet. | Indeterminate | Ksar Metlili | Teeth | Pterosaur | |
| Pterosauria indet. | Indeterminate | Ksar Metlili | KM-A1-38 to 39; KM-B'-54-55; KM-A2-21, teeth; KM-D2-17 and -21, teeth; Numerous robust teeth; Abundant small teeth | Pterosaur | |
| Rhamphorhynchidae indet. | Indeterminate | Ksar Metlili | Teeth | Pterosaur | |

=== Dinosaurs ===
| Genus | Species | Location | Material | Notes | Images |
|---|---|---|---|---|---|
| Dromeosauridae indet. | Indeterminate | Ksar Metlili | KM-A1-10, tooth; KM-B'-26, teeth; KM-D1-6, tooth; KM-D2-11, teeth | Coelurosaur | |
| Maniraptoriformes indet. | Indeterminate | Ksar Metlili | "morphotype II" MNHN SA 2004/5A; "morphotype III"; MNHN SA 2004/4E; KM-B'-22, tooth; KM-A2-9, teeth; KM-D2-8, teeth | Coelurosaur | |
| Ornithischia indet. | Indeterminate | Ksar Metlili | 3 teeth varieties of unknown taxonomic meaning; KM-A2-8, tooth | Ornithischian | |
| Theropoda indet. | Indeterminate | Ksar Metlili | KM-A1-9, claw (pedal?); KM-A1-11, claws; 12 to 13, both teeth; 55, claw (pedal?), 56, claw (ungual?); KM-B'-21, claw; KM-B'-23-25, teeth; 94, claw (ungual?); MNHN SA mcm 167, 2004/2A, 2004/2D, 2004/2C, 2004/2E, 2004/2F, 2004/2G, 2004/3B, 2004/4A, 2004/5C, 2004/5D; KM-A2-10, teeth; KM-C-1, claw; KM-D1-9, teeth; KM-D2-9, claw; KM-D2-10, teeth | Theropod | |
| Velociraptorinae indet. | Indeterminate | Ksar Metlili | "morphotype II"; MNHN SA 2004/5B; "morphotype III"; MNHN SA mcm 158 | Coelurosaur | |

=== Mammals ===
| Genus | Species | Location | Material | Notes | Images |
|---|---|---|---|---|---|
| Afriquiamus | A. nessovi | Ksar Metlili | SA 84 (holotype upper left molar) | Peramurid | |
| Atlasodon | A. monbaroni | Ksar Metlili | MNHN SA 27 (holotype right upper molar) | Theriiform | |
| Amazighodon | A. orbis | Ksar Metlili | MCM 618, left lower molar; KM-B’-2, right lower molar | Donodontid | |
| Amphilestidae indet. | Indeterminate | Ksar Metlili | Teeth | Amphilestid | |
| Anoualestes | A. incidens | Ksar Metlili | KM-B’-97, left lower molar; MCM 620, left lower molar; MCM 623, right lower molar; KM-B’-1, right lower molar; KM-A1-1, left lower molar | Donodontid | |
| Cynodontia? indet. | Indeterminate | Ksar Metlili | KM-B’-44, KM-B’-43, KM-B’-98, teeth crowns; KM-?-1, almost complete ?lower tooth | Two morphotypes, non tritylodontid | |
| Denisodon | D. moroccensis | Ksar Metlili | Isolated m2 MNHN SA 97 | Hahnodontidae Haramiyidan | |
| Donodon | D. prescriptoris, D. minor, sp. | Ksar Metlili | MNHN SA 31 (holotype right upper molar); SA 1, SA 44; MCM 595, right upper molar; KM-A1-2, left upper molar; KM-B'-2, left lower molar; 11, right upper molar; 95, right upper molar; KM-D2-5, left upper molar | Donodontid | |
| Dryolestidae indet. | Indeterminate | Ksar Metlili | KM-D2-4, left lower molar | Dryolestid | |
| Dryolestoidea indet. | Indeterminate | Ksar Metlili | KM-A1-1, left lower molar; KM-B'-1, left lower molar; 37, teeth; 96-97, single left lower molars | Dryolestoid | |
| Dyskritodon | D. amazighi | Ksar Metlili | MNHN SA 92 (holotype right lower molar) | Eutriconodontan | Holotype |
| Eutriconodonta indet. | Indeterminate | Ksar Metlili | KM-A1-3, tooth; KM-B'-3, 6, single lower molars; 8, 30, single teeth; KM-A2-1, tooth; KM-D2-1, tooth | Eutriconodontan | |
| Gobiconodon | G. palaios | Ksar Metlili | SA 107, a right upper molar; SA Ill, a right ?upper molar (M2?); SA 119, a right upper molar; SA 130, a left upper molar (M2?); SA 138, a right upper molar; SA 141, a left upper molar; SA 146, anterior third of a left upper molar; SA 153, anterior two-thirds of a left upper molar; SA 80, a worn right upper molariform; SA 93, a partial left ?upper premolar; SA 129, a partial right ?upper premolar | Eutriconodontan | Gobiconodon |
| Hahnodon | H. taqueti | Ksar Metlili | left m2 | Hahnodontidae Haramiyidan | |
| Hahnodontidae indet. | Indeterminate | Ksar Metlili | Posterior upper premolar; Lower incisor | Hahnodontidae Haramiyidan | |
| Hypomylos | H. phelizoni, H. micros; sp. | Ksar Metlili | SA 82 (right lower molar), 83 (right lower tooth), 45 (right incomplete trigonid); SA 76 (small lower right molar; holotype); MNHN SA 54, lower right molar; KM-B'-4, left lower molar; 9-10, single right lower molars | Tribosphenidan | |
| Ichthyoconodon | I. jaworowskorum | Ksar Metlili | MNHN SA 46 (holotype); SA 78 (right lower molars) | Volaticothere | Holotype |
| Kryptotherium | K. polysphenos | Ksar Metlili | SA 22, a right lower molar; Sa 69, a right lower molar; SA 70, a right lower molar; SA 101, a left lower molar; SA 34, anterior part of a left lower ?premolar | Eutriconodonta | |
| Mammalia indet. | Indeterminate | Ksar Metlili | KM-A1-16, incisor tooth; KM-A1-17, left dentary; KM-A1-36, mandibular fragments, -37, phalanx; KM-B'-31-32, both single incisor teeth; 33-34, left dentary; 35, dentary; 38, right dentary; 50, mandibular fragment; KM-A2-19, mandible; KM-A2-12, left dentary; KM-D1-1, tooth; KM-D1-2, canine; 3, incisor teeth; KM-D2-2, right dentary; KM-D2-3, left dentary; KM-D2-7, dentaries (fragments) | Mammal | |
| Microderson | M. laaroussii | Ksar Metlili | MNHN SA 40 (holotype upper right molar) | Mammal | |
| Minimus | M. richardfoxi | Ksar Metlili | SA 122 (holotype left lower molar), 10 (right lower molar), 64 (left lower molar) | Zatherian | |
| Peramuridae indet. | Indeterminate | Ksar Metlili | Teeth | Peramurid | |
| Peramus | sp. | Ksar Metlili | SA 37 (small tooth) | Peramurid | |
| Stylodens | S. amerrukensis | Ksar Metlili | MCM 578, right upper molar | Donodontid | |
| Symmetrodonta indet. | Indeterminate | Ksar Metlili | KM-B'-36, teeth; | Mammal | |
| Thereuodon | T. dahmani | Ksar Metlili | Teeth | Thereuodontid Symmetrodont | |
| Tribotheria indet. | Indeterminate | Ksar Metlili | SA 55 (left trigonid), 4 (upper left labial tooth fragment) | Tribosphenidan | |
| Tribotherium | T. africanum | Ksar Metlili | MNHN SA 39 (holotype partial right upper molar); SA 72, 56 (teeth), 71, 56 (tooth fragments); KM-B'-5, right upper molar | Tribosphenidan | |
| Triconodontidae indet. | Indeterminate | Ksar Metlili | Teeth | Triconodontid | |
| Zatheria indet. | Indeterminate | Ksar Metlili | Teeth | Cladotherian | |

=== Plants ===
| Genus | Species | Location | Material | Notes | Images |
|---|---|---|---|---|---|
| Coniferophyta | Indeterminate | Ksar Metlili | Branched Shoots | Conifer | |
| Phlebopteris/Piazopteris | Indeterminate | Ksar Metlili | Fronds | A Matoniaceae fern | Phlebopteris |
| Ruffordia? | R?. sp. | Ksar Metlili | Fronds | A Schizaeaceae fern | |
