= Chunnelodon =

Chunnelodon Temporal range: Berriasian

Scientific classification
- Domain: Eukaryota
- Kingdom: Animalia
- Phylum: Chordata
- Class: Mammalia
- Clade: Cladotheria
- Genus: †Chunnelodon; Ensom & Sigogneau-Russell, 1998
- Species: †C. alopekodes

Binomial name
- †Chunnelodon alopekodes Ensom & Sigogneau-Russell, 1998

Extinct family of mammals

Chunnelodon is a genus of extinct mammal from the Early Cretaceous of Southern England. The type and only species is Chunnelodon alopekodes, represented by two lower molars from the Sunnydown Farm locality of the Lulworth Formation of Dorset. The taxon was described by Paul Ensom and Denise Sigogneau-Russell in 1998, who gave the species name from the translation of the Ancient Greek phrase "sly as a fox", with the generic name honouring the British-French collaboration and the newly inaugurated Channel Tunnel. Chunnelodon is diagnosed by multiple features of the dental anatomy including slightly asymmetrical but aligned roots, sharp cusps, a tall protoconid and metaconid, a small paraconid, and a reduced talonid. While it was only assigned to Cladotheria indeterminate, Chunnelodon was likely closely related to Dryolestoidea, although outside the clade.

- Cladotheria
  - Zatheria (incl Marsupialia and Placentalia)
  - - Donodontidae
    - - Chunnelodon
      - Dryolestoidea
        - - Henkelotheriidae?
          - Paurodontidae
        - - Henkelotheriidae?
          - Dryolestidae
