= Anoual Formation =

Geologic formation in Morocco

- Stratigraphic range: Early Bathonian
- Type: Geological formation
- Unit of: Anoual Syncline
- Sub-units: Lower Member, Upper Member
- Underlies: Unconformity with Ksar Metlili Formation
- Overlies: Pholadomya Marls and Limestones Formation
- Thickness: ~500 m (1,600 ft)

Lithology
- Primary: Mudstone (Lower), limestone (Upper)
- Other: Sandstone, limestone, marl (Lower)

Location
- Coordinates: 32.5°N 3.1°W
- Approximate paleocoordinates: 26.9°N 0.9°E
- Region: Figuig Province
- Country: Morocco
- Extent: High Atlas

Type section
- Named for: Anoual
- Anoual Formation (Morocco)

The Anoual Formation is a geological formation in the High Atlas of Morocco. It is early Bathonian in age. It consists of two members. The lower member is several hundred metres thick, and consists largely of mudstone with lens beds of cross bedded sandstone, with thin intercalations of limestone that was deposited in a freshwater continental setting, likely lacustrine or palustrine, with small marine influences. The upper member is several tens of metres thick and consists of limestone deposited in a shallow marine setting. The formation is fossiliferous, with several of the limestone intercalations yielding a diverse fauna, including amphibians, reptiles, dinosaurs and mammals.

== Paleobiota ==
=== Brachiopoda ===
Genus	Species	Location	Stratigraphic Position	Material	Notes	Images
Burmirhynchia	B. gr. termierae-athiaensis	Anoual	Lower Member	Isolated shells	A brachiopod of the family Tetrarhynchiidae	
Kallirhynchia	K. oranensis	Anoual	Lower Member	Isolated shells	A brachiopod of the family Tetrarhynchiidae	Kallirhynchia specimen

=== Arthropoda ===
Genus	Species	Location	Stratigraphic Position	Material	Notes	Images
Asciocythere	A. sp.	Anoual	Lower Member	Isolated Valves	A Marine Ostracod of the family Schulerideidae.	
Bythocypris	B. sp.	Anoual	Lower Member	Isolated Valves	A Marine Ostracod of the family Bythocyprididae	
Asciocythere	A. sp.	Anoual	Lower Member	Isolated Valves	A Marine Ostracod of the family Schulerideidae.	
Cypridea	C. cf. postelongata	Anoual	Upper Member	Isolated Valves	A Freshwater Ostracod of the family Cyprididae	
Cypris	C. spp.	Anoual	Upper Member	Isolated Valves	A Freshwater Ostracod of the family Cyprididae	
Darwinula	D. magna; D. cf. leguminella	Anoual	Upper Member	Isolated Valves	A Freshwater Ostracod of the family Darwinulidae	
Fabanella	F. bathonica; F. sp.	Anoual	Upper Member	Isolated Valves	A Freshwater Ostracod of the order Podocopida	
Fastigocythere	F. sp.	Anoual	Lower Member	Isolated Valves	A Marine Ostracod of the order Podocopida	
Klieana	K. levis	Anoual	Upper Member	Isolated Valves	A Freshwater Ostracod of the order Cytherideidae	
Kinkelinella	K. sp.	Anoual	Lower Member	Isolated Valves	A Freshwater/Brackish Ostracod of the family Protocytheridae	
Mantelliana	M. sp.	Anoual	Upper Member	Isolated Valves	A Freshwater Ostracod of the family Cyprididae	
Metacypris	M. sp.	Anoual	Upper Member	Isolated Valves	A Freshwater/Brackish Ostracod of the family Limnocytheridae	
Paracypris	P. sp.	Anoual	Lower Member	Isolated Valves	A Marine Ostracod of the family Candonidae. Dominant marine taxon	
Pneumatocythere	P.? juglandiformis	Anoual	Lower Member	Isolated Valves	A Marine Ostracod of the order Podocopida	
Praeschuleridea	P. sp.	Anoual	Lower Member	Isolated Valves	A Marine Ostracod of the family Candonidae.	
Procytheridea	P. sp.	Anoual	Lower Member	Isolated Valves	A Marine Ostracod of the order Podocopida	
Scabriculocypris	S. sp.	Anoual	Upper Member	Isolated Valves	A Freshwater Ostracod of the family Cyprididae	
Theriosynoecum	T. sp.	Anoual	Upper Member	Isolated Valves	A Freshwater/Brackish Ostracod of the family Limnocytheridae	

=== Mollusca ===
Genus	Species	Location	Stratigraphic Position	Material	Notes	Images
Lymnaeidae indet.	Indeterminate	Guelb el Ahmar	Upper Member	Isolated shells	Freshwater snails	
Nerineidae indet.	Indeterminate	Anoual	Lower Member	Isolated shells	Marine snails	
Planorbidae indet.	Indeterminate	Guelb el Ahmar	Upper Member	Isolated shells	Freshwater snails	
Provalvata	P. sp.	Anoual	Upper Member	Isolated shells	Freshwater snail of the family Provalvatidae	
Valvatidae indet.	Indeterminate	Guelb el Ahmar	Upper Member	Isolated shells	Freshwater snails	

=== Fish ===
Abundant osteichthyan ichthyoliths are known. An isolated spine displaying characters seen in extant cypriniform or siluriform fishes has been recovered, alternatively can belong to a member of Myriacanthidae.

Genus	Species	Location	Stratigraphic Position	Material	Notes	Images
Arganodus	A. sp.	Guelb el Ahmar	Upper Member	Isolated tooth plates	Lungfish	Arganodus reconstruction
Lepidotes/Scheenstia	L./S. sp.	Guelb el Ahmar	Upper Member	Isolated teeth and scales	Lepidotidae bony fish	Lepidotes reconstruction
cf. Ionoscopiformes indet.	Indeterminate	Guelb el Ahmar	Upper Member	Rhomboidal scales	Tentatively assigned to Ophiopsidae	
Mawsoniidae indet.	Indeterminate	Guelb el Ahmar	Upper Member	Skull bones including a parasphenoid	Coelacanth	
Osteoglossiformes indet.	Indeterminate	Guelb el Ahmar	Upper Member	Squamules (small scales)	The oldest record of the group	

=== Amphibians ===
Genus	Species	Location	Stratigraphic Position	Material	Notes	Images
Albanerpetontidae indet.	Indeterminate	Guelb el Ahmar	Upper Member	Incomplete premaxilla and incomplete frontal	Likely represents a new taxon	
Caudata? indet.	Indeterminate	Guelb el Ahmar	Upper Member	Fragment of a dentary		
Lissamphibia? indet.	Indeterminate	Guelb el Ahmar	Upper Member	Fragment of a maxilla		

=== Turtles ===
Genus	Species	Location	Stratigraphic Position	Material	Notes	Images
Testudinata indet.	"Morphotype 1"	Guelb el Ahmar	Upper Member	Fifty plate fragments	Similar to Solemydidae and Pleurosternidae turtles	
Testudinata indet.	"Morphotype 2"	Guelb el Ahmar	Upper Member	Single neural plate	Plate slightly longer than wide	
Testudinata indet.	"Morphotype 3"	Guelb el Ahmar	Upper Member	Multiple plates	By far the most abundant, maybe a larger taxon with smooth plates	
Testudinata indet.	"Morphotype 4"	Guelb el Ahmar	Upper Member	Two costal plates	Similar to Araripemys and some Trionychidae	

=== Lepidosaurs ===
Genus	Species	Location	Stratigraphic Position	Material	Notes	Images
Parviraptor	cf. P. sp.	Guelb el Ahmar	Upper Member	Four vertebral centra	Squamatan, previously identified as a stem-snake	
Rhynchocephalia indet.	Indeterminate	Guelb el Ahmar	Upper Member	One fragment of dentary bearing two incomplete teeth; one fragment of maxilla bearing the bases of two teeth.	Similar to the co-regional but younger genus Tingitana, but also to Clevosaurus.	
Scincomorpha indet.	Indeterminate	Guelb el Ahmar	Upper Member	A fragment of bone bearing teeth; potentially a fragment of bone bearing one complete tooth	Squamatan	
Squamata indet.	Indeterminate	Guelb el Ahmar	Upper Member	Incomplete maxilla, incomplete dorsal vertebra, one proximal part of femur		

=== Choristoderes ===
Genus	Species	Location	Stratigraphic Position	Material	Notes	Images
Choristodera indet.	Indeterminate	Guelb el Ahmar	Upper Member	Fragmentary dentary, centrum of an anterior caudal vertebra, possibly centrum of a dorsal vertebra	Similar to Cteniogenys	

=== Dinosaurs ===
Genus	Species	Location	Stratigraphic Position	Material	Notes	Images
Ornithischia indet.	Indeterminate	Guelb el Ahmar	Upper Member	Tooth	Similar to Alocodon	Illustration of a fossil of Alocodon
cf. Stegosauria indet.	Indeterminate	Guelb el Ahmar	Upper Member	Poorly preserved tooth		
Theropoda indet.	Indeterminate	Guelb el Ahmar	Upper Member	Several teeth		

=== Pterosaurs ===
Genus	Species	Location	Stratigraphic Position	Material	Notes	Images
Pterosauria indet.	Indeterminate	Guelb el Ahmar	Upper Member	Teeth	Similar to wukongopterids	
Rhamphorhynchidae indet.	Indeterminate	Guelb el Ahmar	Upper Member	Teeth		

=== Crocodyliformes ===
Genus	Species	Location	Stratigraphic Position	Material	Notes	Images
Atoposauridae indet.	Indeterminate	Guelb el Ahmar	Upper Member	Teeth		
Ctenosuchus	C. tenuidens	Anoual–Talsint	Lower Member?	Two specimens, both including a partial skull and osteoderms. One also preserves a partial postcranial skeleton.	A teleosaurid thalattosuchian	Holotype specimen
Teleosauridae indet.	Indeterminate	Guelb el Ahmar	Upper Member	Teeth		
Thalattosuchia indet.	Indeterminate	Guelb el Ahmar	Upper Member	Teeth, various skeletal elements probably belonging to a single individual		
Theriosuchus	cf. T. sp.	Guelb el Ahmar	Upper Member	Teeth	An atoposaurid	

=== Mammals ===
Genus	Species	Location	Stratigraphic Position	Material	Notes	Images
Amphitheriidae indet.	Indeterminate	Guelb el Ahmar	Upper Member	Fragment of juvenile right dentary; fragment of an edentulous right dentary, probably middle-posterior part.	If true is the 1st Gondwanic member of the family	
cf. Dryolestida/Donodontidae indet.	Indeterminate	Guelb el Ahmar	Upper Member	Fragment of a tooth bearing one cusp and one root	Similar to Donodon	

=== Charophyta ===
Genus	Species	Location	Stratigraphic Position	Material	Notes	Images
Aclistochara	A. africana	Guelb el Ahmar	Upper Member	Gyrogonites	A Characean algae of the family Characeae	
Porochara	P. hians	Anoual	Upper Member	Oogonia	A characean algae of the family Porocharaceae	

=== Palynology ===
Genus	Species	Location	Stratigraphic Position	Material	Notes	Images
Alisporites	A. spp.	Guelb el Ahmar	Upper Member	Pollen	Affinities with the families Peltaspermaceae or Corystospermaceae	
Araucariacites	A. australis	Guelb el Ahmar	Upper Member	Pollen	Affinities with Araucariaceae inside Coniferae.	Example of extant Araucaria cones
Callialasporites	C. spp.	Guelb el Ahmar	Upper Member	Pollen	Affinities with Araucariaceae inside Coniferae.	Example of extant Araucaria cones
Classopollis	C. spp.	Guelb el Ahmar	Upper Member	Pollen	Affinities with Cheirolepidiaceae inside Coniferae.	
Cyathidites	C. sp.	Guelb el Ahmar	Upper Member	Spores	Affinities with the family Cyatheaceae inside Cyatheales. Arboreal Fern Spores	Modern Cyathea, Cyathidites come probably from similar genera
Cycadopites	C. spp.	Guelb el Ahmar	Upper Member	Pollen	Affinities with the Cycadopsida inside Cycadales. Pollen related with modern Cycas	Encephalartos, Cycadopites come probably from similar genera
Inaperturopollenites	I. spp.	Guelb el Ahmar	Upper Member	Pollen	Affinities with the Pinidae inside Coniferae.	Extant Pinus Cone. Inaperturopollenites is similar to the pollen found on this genus
Ischyosporites	I. cf. variegatus; I. sp	Guelb el Ahmar	Upper Member	Spores	Affinities with Pteridopsida, likely derived from a member of Anemiaceae	Extant Anemia specimens; Ischyosporites probably comes from similar genera
Leptolepidites	L. spp.	Guelb el Ahmar	Upper Member	Spores	Affinities with the family Dennstaedtiaceae in the Polypodiales. Forest fern spores.	Extant Dennstaedtia specimens; Leptolepidites probably comes from similar genera
Pityosporites	P. sp.	Guelb el Ahmar	Upper Member	Pollen	Affinities with the Pinidae inside Coniferae.	

=== Fossil Wood ===
Genus	Species	Location	Stratigraphic Position	Material	Notes	Images
Agathoxylon	A. aff. sahariense	Guelb el Ahmar; Oued Metlili	Upper Member	Fossil Wood	Conifer fossil wood of the family Araucariaceae	
Metapodocarpoxylon	M. libanoticum	Guelb el Ahmar; Oued Metlili	Upper Member	Fossil Wood	Conifer fossil wood of the family Podocarpaceae	
Protopodocarpoxylon	P. subrochii; P. teixeirae	Guelb el Ahmar; Oued Metlili	Upper Member	Fossil Wood	Conifer fossil wood of the family Hirmeriellaceae	
Phyllocladoxylon	P. atlasicum	Guelb el Ahmar; Oued Metlili	Upper Member	Fossil Wood	Conifer fossil wood of the family Podocarpaceae	

== See also ==
- Ksar Metlili Formation, from the Same area
- Guettioua Formation, coeval from the Azilal Region
- El Mers Group, coeval from the Skoura syncline
- Tafraout Group, older, from the Central High Atlas
- Azilal Formation, older, from the Central High Atlas
