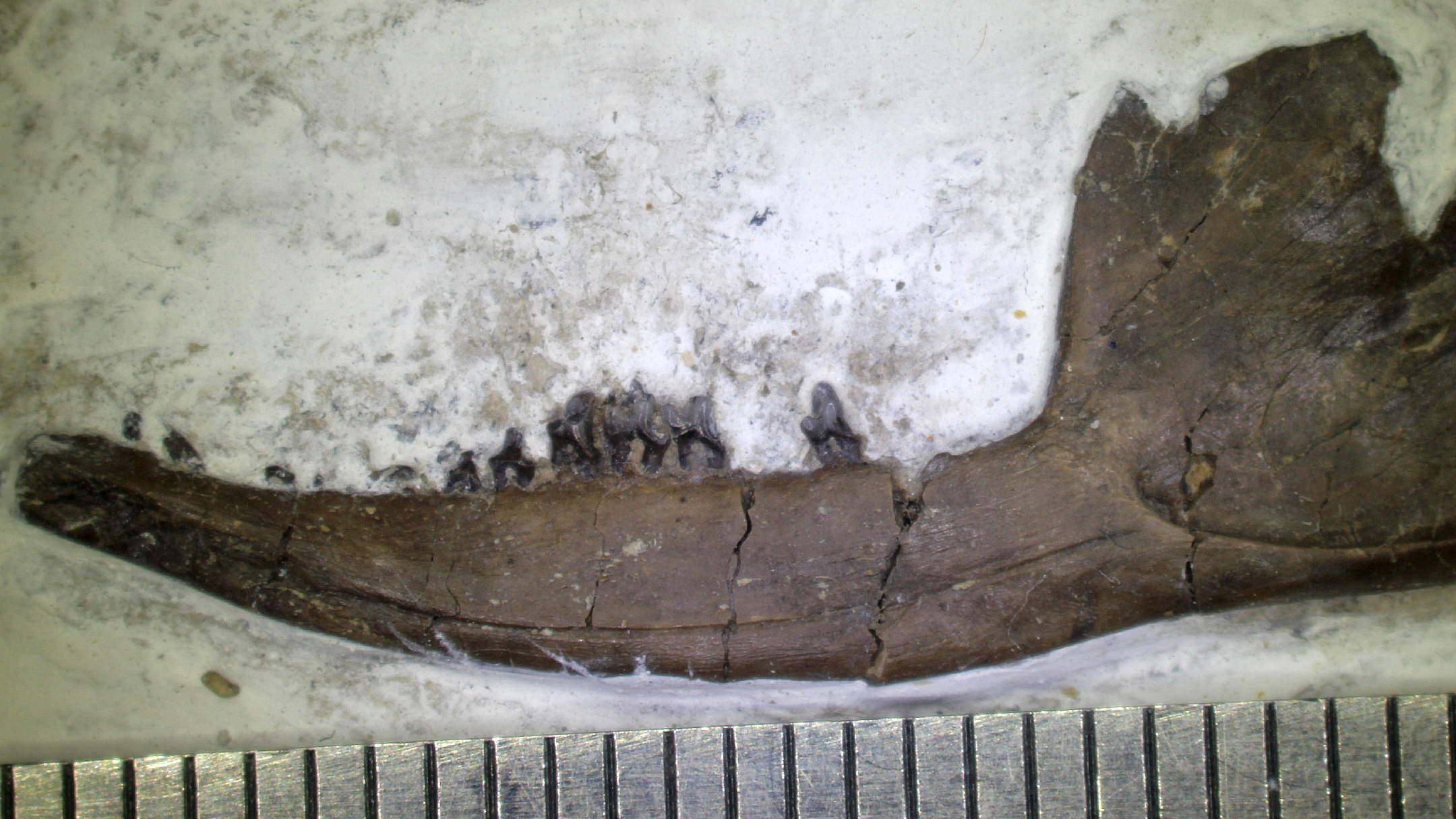

Scientific classification
- Domain: Eukaryota
- Kingdom: Animalia
- Phylum: Chordata
- Class: Mammalia
- Order: †Dryolestida
- Family: †Dryolestidae
- Subfamily: †Kurtodontinae
- Genus: †Phascolestes; Owen, 1871
- Species: †P. mustelulus

Binomial name
- †Phascolestes mustelulus Owen, 1871

Synonyms
- Peraspalax talpoides Owen, 1871; Kurtodon pusillus Osborn, 1888

= Phascolestes =

Phascolestes Temporal range: Berriasian

Extinct family of mammals

Phascolestes is a genus of extinct mammal from the Berriasian epoch of Early Cretaceous Southern England. The type and only species is Phascolestes mustelulus, which was named by Richard Owen in 1871 for dental material from the Lulworth Formation. Phascolestes is a close relative of co-existing taxon Achyrodon within the subfamily Kurtodontinae of the family Dryolestidae, with Kurtodon being a junior synonym of Phascolestes although the subfamily name is still applicable.

- Dryolestidae
  - Dryolestinae
    - Amblotherium
    - - Laolestes
      - Krebsotherium
      - - Dryolestes
        - Guimarotodus
  - Kurtodontinae
    - Crusafontia
    - - Achyrodon
      - Phascolestes
