= Achyrodon =

Achyrodon Temporal range: Early Cretaceous, Berriasian

Scientific classification
- Kingdom: Animalia
- Phylum: Chordata
- Class: Mammalia
- Order: †Dryolestida
- Family: †Dryolestidae
- Genus: †Achyrodon; Owen, 1871
- Species: †A. nanus

Binomial name
- †Achyrodon nanus Owen, 1871

Extinct family of mammals

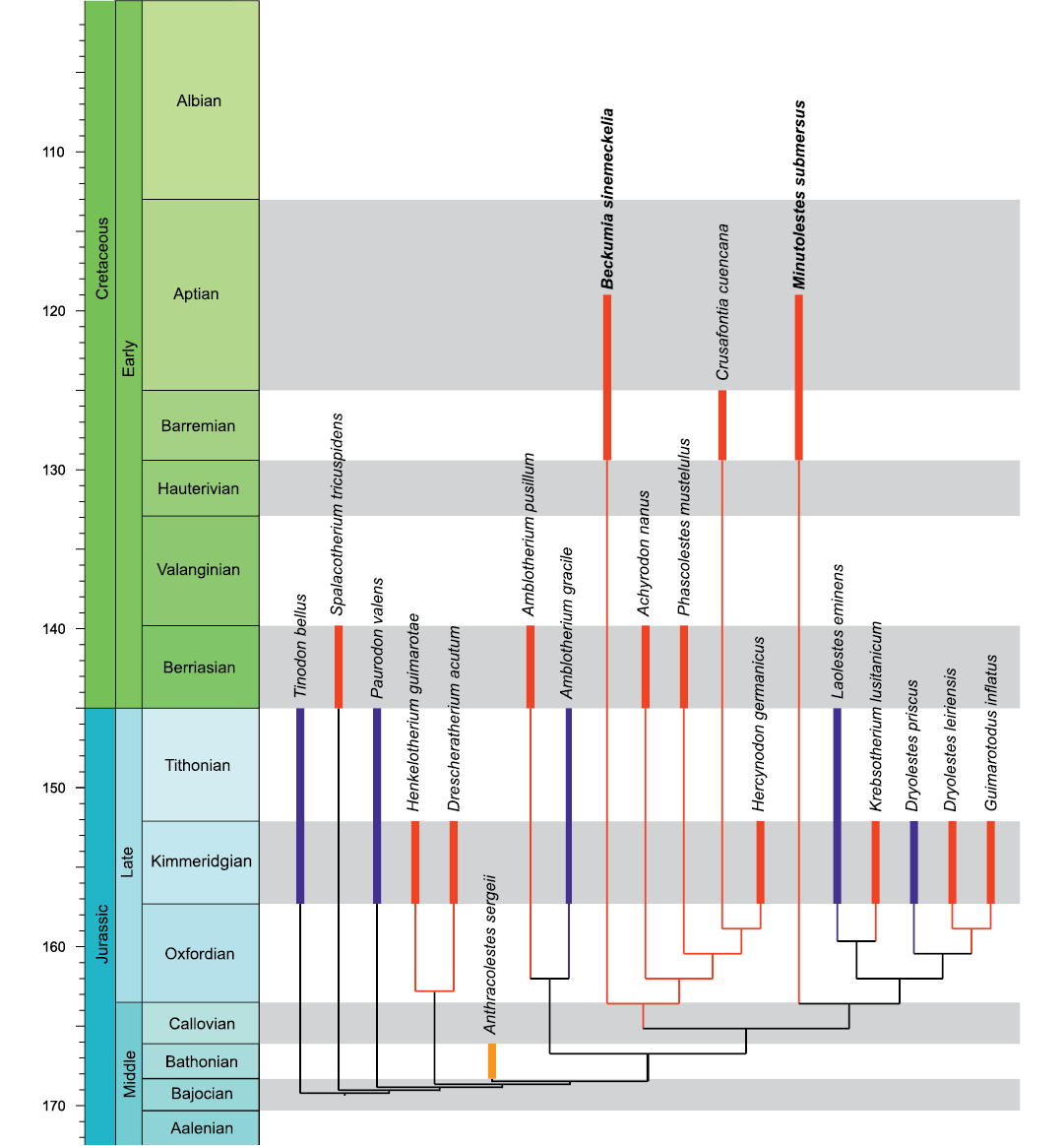
Cladogram showing interrelationships of dryolestids and related groups

Achyrodon is an extinct genus of mammal from the Berriasian epoch of Early Cretaceous southern England. The taxon was first described by Richard Owen in 1871 for teeth from the Lulworth Formation. The taxon has been considered a synonym of co-existing Amblotherium pusillum, but can be distinguished by differences in the dental anatomy and an overall smaller size. Achyrodon was closely related to co-existing genus Phascolestes and the slightly younger European form Crusafontia, and together they make up the subfamily Kurtodontinae within Dryolestidae, a family of early mammals between modern monotremes and therians with no living descendants.

- Dryolestidae
  - Dryolestinae
    - Amblotherium
    - - Laolestes
      - Krebsotherium
      - - Dryolestes
        - Guimarotodus
  - Kurtodontinae
    - Crusafontia
    - - Achyrodon
      - Phascolestes
