= Donodontidae =

Donodontidae Temporal range: Tithonian–Berriasian

Scientific classification
- Kingdom: Animalia
- Phylum: Chordata
- Class: Mammalia
- Clade: Cladotheria
- Family: †Donodontidae; Sigogneau-Russell, 1991

Genera
- Donodon; Stylodens; Anoualestes; Amazighodon

Extinct family of mammals

Donodontidae is an extinct family of cladotherian mammals known from the Late Jurassic and Early Cretaceous of North Africa. When originally named in 1991, Donodontidae was a monotypic family containing a single species: Donodon perscriptoris. In 2022, four more species were designated and placed within the family: Donodon minor, Stylodens amerrukensis, Anoualestes incidens, and Amazighodon orbis. All five species are endemic to the Ksar Metlili Formation of Morocco, which is dated to the Tithonian (last stage of the Jurassic) and Berriasian (first stage of the Cretaceous). Donodontid fossils are restricted to postcanine teeth and associated jaw fragments.

== Teeth ==
Donodontid molars are pre-tribosphenic, a form approaching the tribosphenic teeth of therian mammals and their closest relatives. The lower molars are known in Donodon, Anoualestes, and Amazighodon. Each lower molar is mostly made up of the trigonid, a triangular region defined by three major cusps. The protoconid cusp forms the labial tip (cheek side), and a paraconid and metaconid (at the mesial/front and distal/rear, respectively) lie at the lingual edge (tongue side). The trigonid region is followed by a low but distinctive "heel", the talonid region, at the back of the tooth. Unlike true tribosphenic mammals, the talonid is relatively underdeveloped and not specialized to function as a mortar. The upper molars are still formatted for external shearing, without a protocone cusp to act as a pestle.

Donodontid teeth have several distinctive traits when compared to their relatives. In the lower molars, the protoconid is the largest and highest cusp, though less pronounced than in some other pre-tribosphenic mammals. The paraconid and metaconid are similar in size to each other, divided by a sharp notch. The talonid region is broader than long, terminating at a small yet distinct cusp (the hypoconulid) at its rear tip. Another subtle cusp ("cusp e") is positioned near the front of the trigonid region, mesiolingual to the paraconid. A pair of sharp keels, the paracristid and protocristid, project away from the protoconid and sharply curve lingually to meet the paraconid and metaconid, respectively. The tip of the paraconid also sends down a smaller keel along its mesiolingual surface, adjacent to cusp e.

The upper molars, which are only known in Donodon and Stylodens, are semi-triangular. They are not as mesiodistally compressed as in other early cladotherians, and some may even be longer (from front-to-back) than wide. The lingual apex of the upper molar hosts a large cusp known as the paracone, which sends out two straight and narrow keels towards the labial edge: the paracrista (at the mesial/front rim of the tooth) and metacrista (at the distal/rear rim). A small rear cusp, the metacone, develops midway down the metacrista. Another cusp at the front of the tooth, the parastyle, scoops upwards in front of the paracrista. One or more pronounced cusps may also occur along the labial edge of the tooth, such as the stylocone (at the front) or median stylar cusp (midway along the edge).

== Classification ==
Donodontidae is one of several mammal groups informally described as "dryolestoids", a term applied to a probable grade of basal cladotherians. Other "dryolestoids" include the Laurasian Dryolestida, and the South American Meridiolestida. A few studies in the 1990s suggested that Donodon was an early meridiolestidan.

Phylogenetic analyses by Lasseron et al. (2022) support a position for Donodontidae as the sister taxon to Prototribosphenida. Prototribosphenida is the mammalian subgroup containing Tribosphenida (true Laurasian tribosphenic mammals) and certain close relatives such as amphitheriids and peramurids. Close relations between donodontids and prototribosphenidans are supported by a number of synapomorphies, most notably their relatively tall talonid, elevated hypoconulid, and uncompressed upper molars. Donodontids are more closely related to prototribosphenidans than to any other "dryolestoids", supporting the paraphyletic nature of "Dryolestoidea".

Donodontidae adds to a growing list of African early cladotherians. This list also includes Abelodon, Brancatherulum, the tribosphenidans Tribotherium and Hypomylos, and the possible peramurid Tendagurutherium, as well as indeterminate amphitheriids, dryolestids, and peramurids. African cladotherians are widely distributed and taxonomically diverse, suggesting that the early evolution of Cladotheria was not restricted to Laurasia as commonly believed.

The following cladogram is a simplified 50% majority rule consensus tree from the phylogenetic analysis of Lasseron et al. (2022), with Donodon constrained to be monophyletic.

- Cladotheria
  - Meridiolestida
  - - Dryolestida
    - - Donodontidae
        - Stylodens
        - Donodon
        - - Anoualestes
          - Amazighodon
      - Prototribosphenida
        - Vincelestes
        - - Amphitherium
          - - - Amphibetulimus
              - Nanolestes
            - - Palaeoxonodon
              - Zatheria
