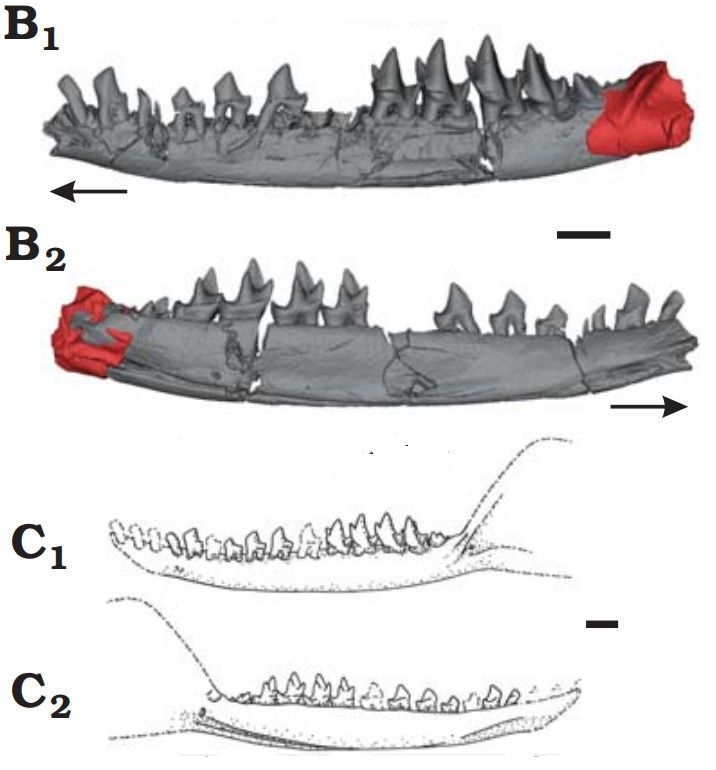

Scientific classification
- Kingdom: Animalia
- Phylum: Chordata
- Class: Mammalia
- Order: †Amphitheriida
- Family: †Amphitheriidae
- Genus: †Palaeoxonodon; Freeman, 1976
- Species: †P. ooliticus

Binomial name
- †Palaeoxonodon ooliticus Freeman, 1976

Synonyms
- P. freemani Sigogneau-Russell 2003; P. leesi Sigogneau-Russell 2003; Kennetheridium leesi Sigogneau-Russell 2003

= Palaeoxonodon =

Palaeoxonodon Temporal range: Bathonian ~167–165 Ma

Extinct genus of mammals

Palaeoxonodon is an extinct genus of cladotherian mammal from the Middle Jurassic of England and Scotland.

== Discovery ==
The first fossils of Palaeoxonodon ooliticus were found in the "Mammal Bed" in Kirtlington Quarry, Oxfordshire, England. This site was rich in Mesozoic mammal remains from the Bathonian Forest Marble Formation. Later, two more species of Palaeoxonodon were named from the same site, P. leesi and P. freemani. All of these fossils were individual teeth.

However, a recent fossil recovered from the Kilmaluag Formation of Skye, Scotland comprised a lower jaw with five molar teeth, four premolars, a canine and one incisor present. This more complete fossil suggests that the separate species previously named from England were in fact all the same species, P. ooliticus, and only appeared different due to their differing position along the tooth row. This was also the case for Kennetheridium leesi.

Two dentaries have recently been described.

== Description ==
Palaeoxonodon ooliticus, like most mammals in the Mesozoic, was relatively small. The most complete fossil jaw - from Scotland - measures 11.6mm, but does not include the very front or rear portions of the jaw. The living animal was probably around the size of a mouse and would have been insectivorous.

The teeth of Palaeoxondon have an elongate lower molar talonid, with hypoconid placed buccal to the midline of the crown, well-developed upper molar metacone and wing-like parastylar region. Compared to its closest relatives, Palaeoxonodon has rather slender jaws.

== Taxonomy ==
Palaeoxondon belongs in the order Amphitheriida, closely related to Dryolestida. They are among the earliest cladotherian mammals, which have their origins in the Middle Jurassic and consist of the descendants of the last common ancestor of Amphitheriida, Dryolestida, Peramurida and Zatheria (which includes modern Therian mammals). Recent phylogenetic studies indicate that Palaeoxonodon was a sister taxon of Amphitherium itself. Cladogram after Panciroli et al. 2018:

- Cladotheria
  - Dryolestida
  - - Vincelestes
    - - Nanolestes
      - Arguimus
      - - Peramus
        - Amphitheriidae
          - Palaeoxonodon
          - Amphitherium
      - - Kielantherium
        - - Aegialodon
          - Theria (modern placentals, marsupials, and relatives)

However, some studies have not found a close relationship with Amphitherium. Cladogram after Lasseron et al. 2022:

- Cladotheria
  - Meridiolestida
  - - Dryolestida
    - - Donodontidae
      - Prototribosphenida
        - Vincelestes
        - - Amphitherium
          - - - Amphibetulimus
              - Nanolestes
            - - Palaeoxonodon
              - Zatheria
                - - Arguimus
                  - Peramus
                - Tribosphenida
