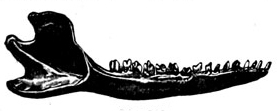

Scientific classification
- Domain: Eukaryota
- Kingdom: Animalia
- Phylum: Chordata
- Class: Mammalia
- Clade: Prototribosphenida
- Order: †Amphitheriida; Prothero, 1981
- Family: †Amphitheriidae; Owen, 1846

Genera
- †Amphitherium; †Palaeoxonodon

= Amphitheriidae =

Amphitheriidae Temporal range: Middle Jurassic, 174.7–161.5 Ma

Extinct family of mammals

Amphitheriidae is a family of Mesozoic mammals restricted to the Middle Jurassic of Britain, with indeterminate members also possibly known from the equivalently aged Itat Formation in Siberia and the Anoual Formation of Morocco. They were members of Cladotheria, more derived than members of Dryolestida, and possibly forming a close relationship with Peramuridae. Amphitheriidae is the only family of the order Amphitheriida.

== Classification ==
Cladogram after Panciroli et al. 2018:

- Cladotheria
  - Dryolestida
  - - Vincelestes
    - - Nanolestes
      - Arguimus
      - - Peramus
        - Amphitheriidae
      - - Kielantherium
        - - Aegialodon
          - Theria (modern placentals, marsupials, and relatives)

Cladogram after Magallanes et al, 2024:

- Cladotheria
  - Dryolestida
  - - Paurodon
    - Drescheratherium
    - Foxraptor
    - Meridiolestida
    - Zatheria
      - Amphitheriidae
      - Peramus
      - Vincelestes
      - - Kielantherium
        - - Pappotherium
          - Eutheria (placentals and relatives)
          - Metatheria (marsupials and relatives)
