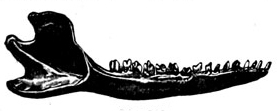
- Drawing of the jaw of A. prevostii from the Stonesfield Slate

Scientific classification
- Kingdom: Animalia
- Phylum: Chordata
- Class: Mammalia
- Order: †Amphitheriida
- Family: †Amphitheriidae
- Genus: †Amphitherium; Blainville, 1838

Type species
- †Amphitherium prevostii (Mayer, 1832)

Other species
- †A. rixoni Butler and Clemens, 2001

= Amphitherium =

Amphitherium Temporal range: Middle Jurassic Bathonian

Extinct family of mammals

Amphitherium is an extinct genus of stem cladotherian mammal that lived during the Middle Jurassic of England. It was one of the first Mesozoic mammals ever described. A recent phylogenetic study found it to be the sister taxon of Palaeoxonodon. It is found in the Forest Marble Formation and the Taynton Limestone Formation.

== Etymology ==
Amphitherium comes from the Greek amphi meaning 'on both sides', and therion meaning 'wild beast'. This was in reference to de Blainville's incorrect belief that the original fossil jaw of this animal was not a mammal, but something in between mammals and reptiles.

== History ==
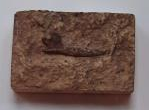
Cast of the jaw of A. prevostii from the Stonesfield Slate

The first jaws of mammals from the Mesozoic - including Amphitherium - were found in the Stonesfield Slate, part of the Taynton Limestone Formation near Stonesfield in England. These were bought by a student of the British paleontologist William Buckland. Although he thought the jaws were mammalian, the anatomist Georges Cuvier misidentified them as being from a marsupial mammal, Didelphis. Later they were identified as being a new genus, and named Amphitherium. It was first mentioned in the scientific literature alongside Megalosaurus, by William Buckland. It came from the Stonesfield Slate of Oxfordshire, England, and Buckland described it in 1824 as "not less extraordinary" than the dinosaur, but it was the larger fossil reptile that captured public imagination. Additional remains were recovered in the late 20th century from the Kirtlington Quarry and Watton Cliff, both part of the Forest Marble Formation

Other early mammal discoveries included Amphilestes, Phascolotherium, and the mammal relative, Stereognathus.

== Classification ==
Amphitherium is placed as a member of the clade Cladotheria. Some studies have placed it with Palaeoxonodon, also known from the Middle Jurassic of Britain, as part of the clade Amphitheriidae. Cladogram after Panciroli et al. 2018:

- Cladotheria
  - Dryolestida
  - - Vincelestes
    - - Nanolestes
      - Arguimus
      - - Peramus
        - Amphitheriidae
          - Palaeoxonodon
          - Amphitherium
      - - Kielantherium
        - - Aegialodon
          - Theria (modern placentals, marsupials, and relatives)

However, some studies have not found a close relationship with Palaeoxonodon. Cladogram after Lasseron et al. 2022:

- Cladotheria
  - Meridiolestida
  - - Dryolestida
    - - Donodontidae
      - Prototribosphenida
        - Vincelestes
        - - Amphitherium
          - - - Amphibetulimus
              - Nanolestes
            - - Palaeoxonodon
              - Zatheria
                - - Arguimus
                  - Peramus
                - Tribosphenida
