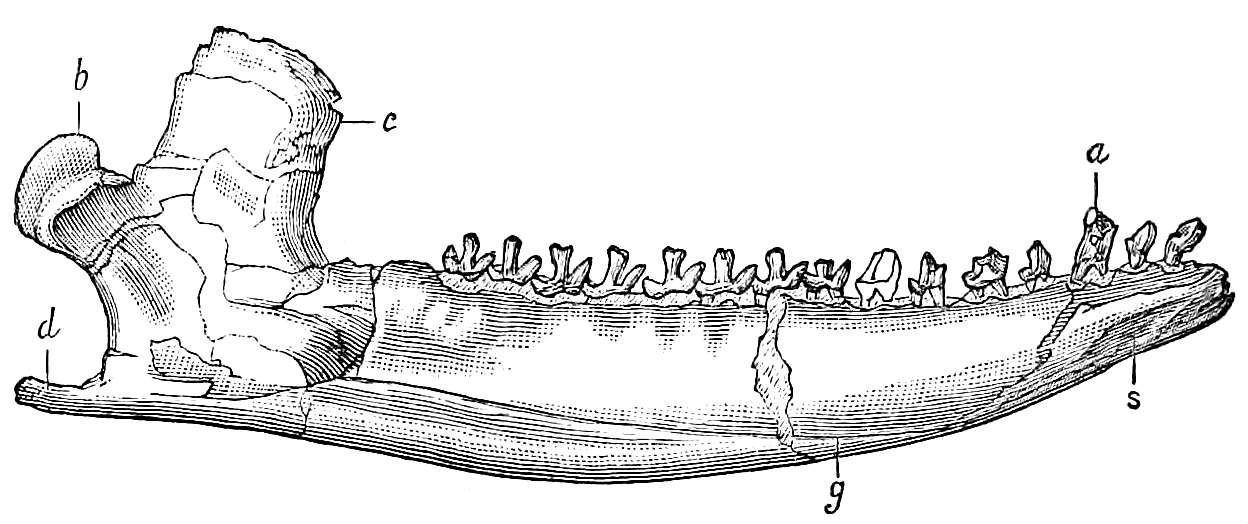
- Dryolestes priscus lower jaw

Scientific classification
- Domain: Eukaryota
- Kingdom: Animalia
- Phylum: Chordata
- Class: Mammalia
- Order: †Dryolestida
- Family: †Dryolestidae
- Subfamily: †Dryolestinae
- Genus: †Dryolestes; Marsh, 1878

Species
- Dryolestes priscus Marsh, 1878 (type); Dryolestes leiriensis Martin, 1999

Synonyms
- Herpetairus Marsh, 1879

= Dryolestes =

Dryolestes Temporal range: Late Jurassic, Kimmeridgian–Tithonian

Genus of mammals

Dryolestes is an extinct genus of Late Jurassic mammal from the Morrison Formation and the Alcobaça Formation of Portugal. The type species Dryolestes priscus is present in stratigraphic zones 2, 5, and 6.

- Dryolestidae
  - Kurtodontinae
    - Crusafontia
    - - Achyrodon
      - Phascolestes
  - Dryolestinae
    - Amblotherium
    - - Laolestes
      - Krebsotherium
      - - Guimarotodus
        - Dryolestes priscus
        - Dryolestes leiriensis

== See also ==
- Prehistoric mammal
  - List of prehistoric mammals
- Paleobiota of the Morrison Formation
