= Donodon =

Donodon Temporal range: Tithonian–Berriasian

Scientific classification
- Kingdom: Animalia
- Phylum: Chordata
- Class: Mammalia
- Clade: Cladotheria
- Family: †Donodontidae
- Genus: †Donodon; Sigogneau-Russell, 1991

Species
- D. minor Lasseron et al., 2022; D. perscriptoris Sigogneau-Russell, 1991 (Type)

Extinct genus of mammals

Donodon is an extinct genus of mammal from the Ksar Metlili Formation of Talssint, Morocco, which has been dated to the Late Jurassic to Early Cretaceous epochs (Tithonian–Berriasian ages). The type species D. perscriptoris was described in 1991 by the palaeontologist Denise Sigogneau-Russell. A second species, D. minor, was named in 2022. Donodon was a member of Cladotheria, a group that includes therian mammals (marsupials and placentals) and some of their closest relatives. It differed from dryolestids in having upper molars that were not compressed mesiodistally. Some studies have suggested that it was closely related to various South American cladotherians in the clade Meridiolestida, with specific similarities to Mesungulatum, a herbivorous mesungulatid, being noted. On the other hand, a 2022 phylogenetic analysis found it to be only distantly related to meridiolestidans, and instead closer to crown group therians.
