= Cheek teeth =

Molar and premolar teeth in mammals

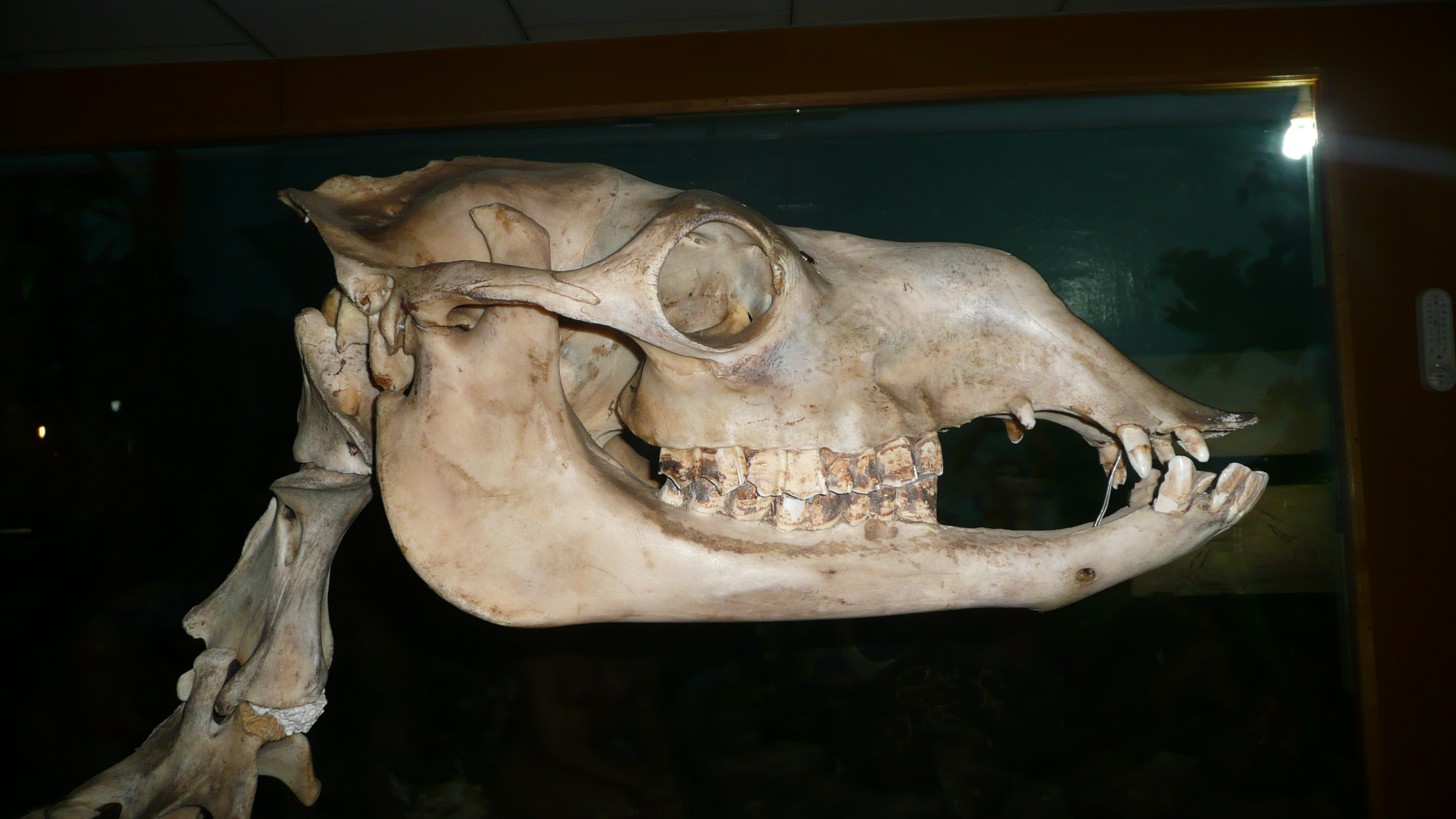
Camel skull showing the cheek teeth and the diastema

Cheek teeth or postcanines comprise the molar and premolar teeth in mammals. Cheek teeth are multicuspidate (having many folds or tubercles). Mammals have multicuspidate molars (three in placentals, four in marsupials, in each jaw quadrant) and premolars situated between canines and molars whose shape and number varies considerably among particular groups. For example, many modern Carnivora possess carnassials, or secodont teeth. This scissor-like pairing of the last upper premolar and first lower molar is adapted for shearing meat. In contrast, the cheek teeth of deer and cattle are selenodont. Viewed from the side, these teeth have a series of triangular cusps or ridges, enabling the ruminants' sideways jaw motions to break down tough vegetable matter. Cheek teeth are sometimes separated from the incisors by a gap called a diastema.

Cheek teeth in reptiles are much simpler as compared to mammals.

== Roles and significance ==
Apart from helping grind the food to properly reduce the size of substrates for stomach enzymes, their minor role is in giving shape and definition to the animals' jaws. The shape of cheek teeth are directly related to their function, and morphological differences between species can be attributed to their dietary variations. Additionally, the shape of a cheek tooth can be mechanically worn down based on diet, which is used to provide insights into the consumption habits of fossilized animals. Proper cleaning of cheek teeth is vital for all species of organisms and many species including humans and ruminants keep it on top of their crucial priority list. Dental caries may result from improper care of cheek teeth which is a prominent problem across the globe.

== Evolution ==
Mammalian, multicusped cheek teeth probably evolved from single-cusped teeth in synapsids, although the diversity of therapsid molar patterns and the complexity in the molars of the earliest mammals make determining how this happened impossible. According to the widely accepted "differentiation theory", additional cusps have arisen by budding or outgrowth from the crown, while the rivalling "concrescence theory" instead proposes that complex teeth evolved by the clustering of originally separate conical teeth. Therian mammals (placentals and marsupials) are generally agreed to have evolved from an ancestor with tribosphenic cheek teeth, with three main cusps arranged in a triangle.

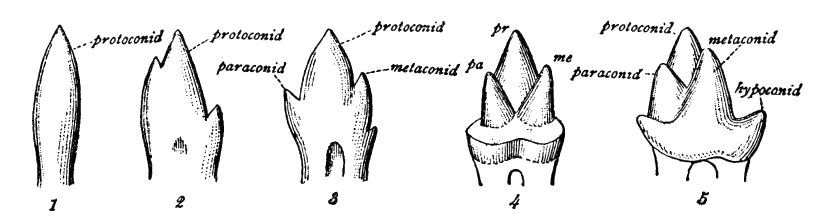
Comparison of cheek teeth in various taxa: 1, a single-cusped pelycosaur; 2, Dromatherium (a Triassic cynodont); 3, Microconodon (a Triassic eucynodont); 4, Spalacotherium (a Cretaceous "symmetrodont"); 5, Amphitherium (a Jurassic prototribosphenid mammal)

== Bibliography ==
- Zhao, Z.; Weiss, K. M.; Stock, D. W. (2000). "Development and evolution of dentition patterns and their genetic basis". In Teaford, Mark F; Smith, Moya Meredith; Ferguson, Mark WJ (eds.). Development, Function and Evolution of Teeth. Cambridge University Press. pp. 152–72. ISBN 978-0-511-06568-2.
