= Aegialodontia =

Aegialodontia Temporal range: Early Cretaceous, Berriasian–Albian

Scientific classification
- Domain: Eukaryota
- Kingdom: Animalia
- Phylum: Chordata
- Class: Mammalia
- Clade: Tribosphenida
- Clade: †Aegialodontia; Butler, 1978

Genera
- †Tribactonodon?; †Aegialodontidae Kermack, 1967; †Aegialodon; †Kielantherium

Clade of mammals

Aegialodontia is a clade of extinct early mammals, close to the origin of Boreosphenida. The clade includes some of the oldest known tribosphenic taxa, until the discovery of Tribactonodon from the Berriasian Durlston Formation in 2001, Aegialodon from the Valanginian Wadhurst Clay Formation was the oldest taxon with the tooth form. The Aptian to Albian taxon Kielantherium from Mongolia, formerly a synonym of Aegialodon, is also within the group, sister to Aegialodon within Aegialodontidae.
