= The World After Dinosaurs =

Television documentary series

The World After Dinosaurs is a documentary produced by NHK, which focuses on the evolution of mammals throughout the Mesozoic into the Cenozoic. In America, the documentary aired on the National Geographic Channel under the name Life After Dinosaurs.

== Plot ==
=== Triassic segment ===
The first segment starts in the Late Triassic period. Animals from this time include Adelobasileus, Placerias, Desmatosuchus and Coelophysis.

=== Jurassic segment ===
The second segment is set in the Late Jurassic time period. Animals from the period include Stegosaurus, Allosaurus, Supersaurus, Laolestes and Eomaia.

=== Cretaceous segment ===
The segment is set in the Cretaceous. Animals from the Cretaceous include Citipati, Cimolestes, Sinosauropteryx, Triceratops, Tyrannosaurus, Kritosaurus, Deinosuchus, Carnotaurus, Saltasaurus and a generic species of Talarurus (believed in the segment to be an Edmontonia).

=== Cenozoic segment ===
The segment is set in a whole new era that is way after the dinosaurs's reign. Creatures from the era include Leptictidium, Propalaeotherium, Europolemur, Diplocynodon, Bemalambda, Archaeolambda, Entelodon, Hyaenodon, Paraceratherium, Thylacosmilus, Doedicurus, Promacrauchenia, Alcidedorbignya, Mayulestes, Asiocoryphodon, Smilodon, Tingamarra and Embolotherium (named as Brontotherium in reality), and Gastornis (named in the show as Diatryma).
