= Metacypris =

Scientific classification
- Domain: Eukaryota
- Kingdom: Animalia
- Phylum: Arthropoda
- Class: Ostracoda
- Order: Podocopida
- Family: Limnocytheridae
- Genus: Metacypris; Brady & Robertson, 1870

Genus of crustaceans

Metacypris is a genus of ostracods belonging to the family Limnocytheridae.

Species:

- Metacypris cordata
