= Bythocyprididae =

Scientific classification
- Kingdom: Animalia
- Phylum: Arthropoda
- Clade: Pancrustacea
- Class: Ostracoda
- Order: Podocopida
- Family: Bythocyprididae

Family of crustaceans

Bythocyprididae is a family of crustaceans belonging to the order Podocopida.

Genera:

- Anchistrocheles Brady & Norman, 1889
- Bythocypris Brady, 1880
- Bythopussella Warne, 1990
- Orlovibairdia McKenzie, 1977
- Zabythocypris Maddocks, 1969
