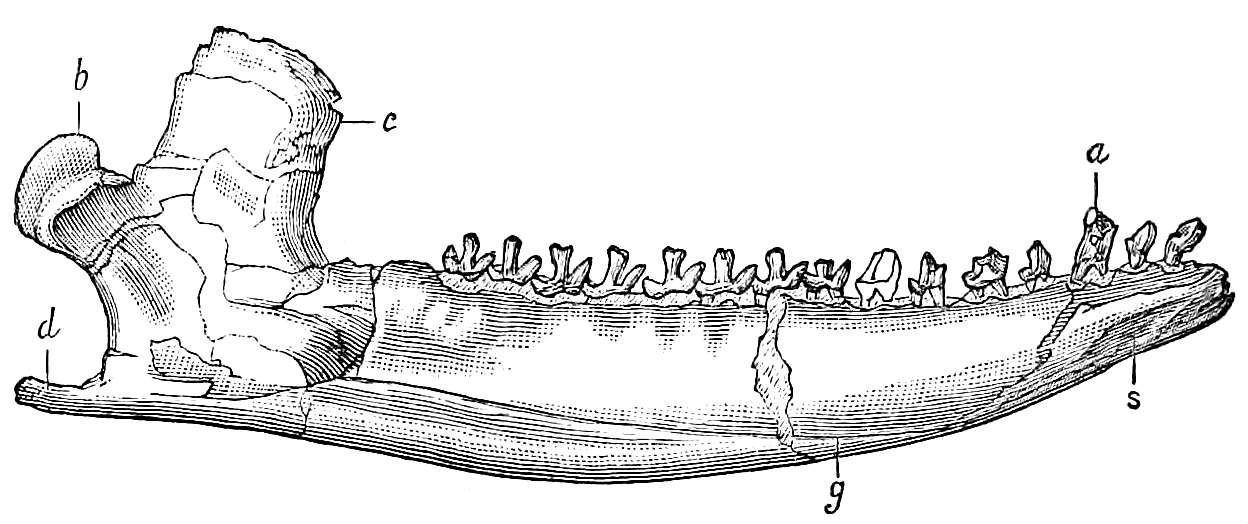
- Lower jaw of namesake species Dryolestes priscus

Scientific classification
- Kingdom: Animalia
- Phylum: Chordata
- Class: Mammalia
- Order: †Dryolestida
- Family: †Dryolestidae; Marsh, 1879

Genera
- †Portopinheirodon?; †Kurtodontinae Osborn, 1888; †Achyrodon; †Crusafontia; †Phascolestes; †Dryolestinae Marsh, 1879; †Amblotherium; †Dryolestes; †Guimarotodus; †Krebsotherium; †Lakolestes; †Laolestes

= Dryolestidae =

Dryolestidae Temporal range: Middle Jurassic–Early Cretaceous

Extinct family of mammals

Dryolestidae is an extinct family of Mesozoic mammals, known from the Middle Jurassic to the Early Cretaceous of the North Hemisphere. The oldest known member, Anthracolestes, is known from the Middle Jurassic Itat Formation of Western Siberia, but most other representatives are known from the Late Jurassic of North America and the Late Jurassic and Early Cretaceous of Europe. Most members are only known from isolated teeth and jaw fragments. Like many other groups of early mammals, they are thought to have been insectivores. They are generally classified in Cladotheria, meaning that they are considered to be more closely related to marsupials and placentals than to monotremes. They are placed as part of the broader Dryolestida, which also includes the (possibly paraphyletic) Paurodontidae, and also sometimes the South American-Antarctic Meridiolestida, which are often considered unrelated cladotherians. Dryolestidae taxon is not based on a phylogenetic definition, but instead on the possession of unequal roots for the molars of the lower jaw. Additionally, the clade is distinguished by hypsodonty in lower molars, and uneven labio-lingual height for the alveolar borders of the dentary.

== Cladogram ==
- Dryolestida
  - Vincelestes
  - - Euthlastus
    - Paurodon
    - - Drescheratherium
      - Henkelotherium
    - - Tathiodon
      - - Groebertherium
        - Dryolestidae
          - Kurtodontinae
            - Crusafontia
            - - Achyrodon
              - Phascolestes (incl Kurtodon, Peraspalax)
          - Dryolestinae
            - - Amblotherium gracile
              - Amblotherium pusillum
            - - Krebsotherium
              - Laolestes
              - - Dryolestes priscus
                - Dryolestes leiriensis
                - Guimarotodus
