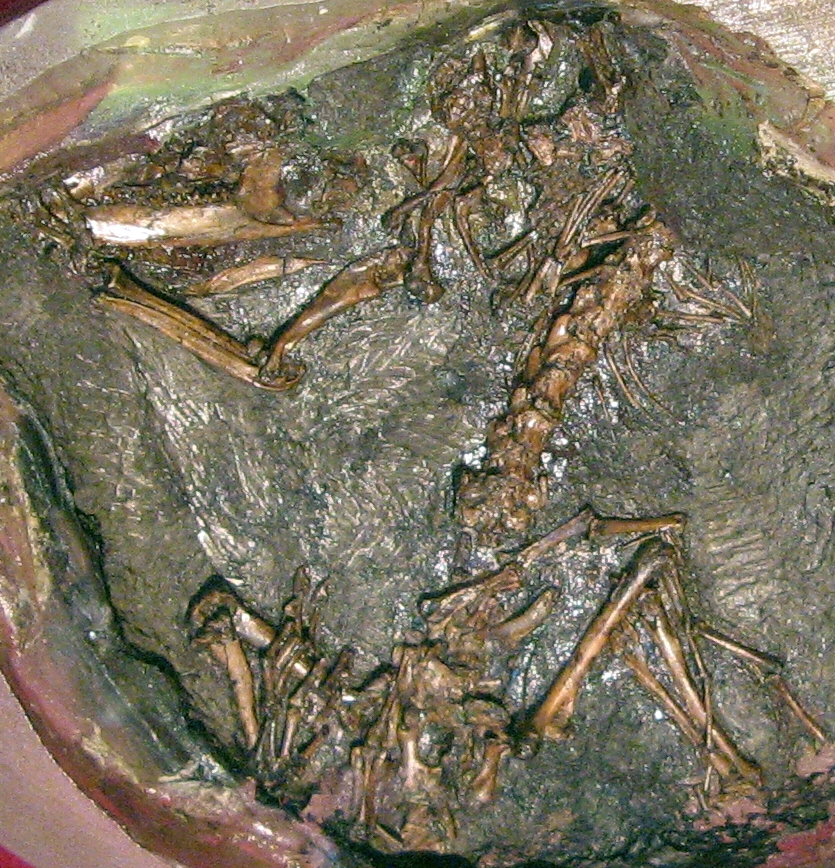
- Skeleton of Henkelotherium

Scientific classification
- Kingdom: Animalia
- Phylum: Chordata
- Class: Mammalia
- Clade: Cladotheria
- Superorder: †Dryolestoidea; Butler, 1939
- Order: †Dryolestida; Prothero, 1981

Families and genera
- Anthracolestes; Tathiodon; Euthlastus; Paurodon; Drescheratherium; Henkelotherium; Dryolestidae

= Dryolestida =

Dryolestida Temporal range: Bathonian-Early Cretaceous 164.7–113 Ma

Extinct order of mammals

Dryolestida is an extinct order of mammals, known from the Jurassic and Cretaceous. They are considered basal members of the clade Cladotheria, close to the ancestry of therian mammals. It is also believed that they developed a fully mammalian jaw and also had the three middle ear bones. Most members of the group, as with most Mesozoic mammals, are only known from fragmentary tooth and jaw remains.

The group contains Dryolestidae and the possibly paraphyletic Paurodontidae, and some other unplaced genera, which were small insectivores, known from the Middle Jurassic to Early Cretaceous of Laurasia, primarily Europe and North America, with a single record from Asia. During the Late Jurassic in North America and from the Late Jurassic to Early Cretaceous in Europe, they were among the most diverse mammal groups. They have sometimes been placed as part of a broader group, the "Dryolestoidea", which typically includes Dryolestida and Meridiolestida, a diverse group of mammals including both small insectivores and mid-large sized herbivores known from the Late Cretaceous to Miocene of South America and possibly Antarctica. However, in many phylogenetic analyses, Meridiolestida are recovered as an unrelated group of basal cladotherians, rendering "Dryolestoidea" paraphyletic.

Dryolestids were formerly considered part of Pantotheria and/or Eupantotheria. The clade Quirogatheria, erected by José Bonaparte in 1992, is often used as a synonym for Dryolestida. Originally, Quirogatheria was meant to include Brandoniidae, but this family is now included with the dryolestids.

== Morphology ==
Dryolestids are mostly represented by teeth, fragmented dentaries and parts of the rostrum. The Jurassic forms retained a coronoid and splenial, but the Cretaceous forms lack these. Another primitive feature is the presence of a Meckelian groove (Meridiolestidans lost it altogether). A fundamentally modern ear is known in at least Dryolestes and mesungulatids.

The basal non dryolestid dryolestidan Henkelotherium from the Late Jurassic of Portugal is known from a partial articulated skeleton, and is thought to have been arboreal, adapted to climbing and living in trees.

Tooth enamel evolved differently in marsupials and eutherians. In a first phase, during the late Triassic and Jurassic, prisms separated from the interprismatic matrix, probably independently in several Mesozoic mammal lineages. More derived enamel types evolved in a second phase, during the Tertiary and Quaternary, but without replacing the old prismatic enamel, instead forming various combinations of three-dimensional structures (called schmelzmuster). Dryolestid dentition is thought to resemble the primitive mammalian dentition before the marsupial-eutherian differentiation and dryolestids are candidates to be the last common ancestor of the two mammalian subclasses. In mesungulatids molar tooth eruption is delayed compared to other dryolestoids.

== Distribution ==
Dryolestids are known from the Jurassic through Early Cretaceous of the Northern Hemisphere (North America, Eurasia, and North Africa) and from the Late Cretaceous through to the Miocene of South America. Drylestoids are very rarely found in the Cenozoic, as are the few other Mesozoic mammals with later descendants, such as multituberculates, monotremes, and gondwanatheres.

The oldest named member of Dryolestidae is Anthracolestes from the Middle Jurassic (Bathonian) aged Itat Formation in western Siberia. Fragmentary remains attributable to dryolestidans are known from the equivalently aged Forest Marble Formation of England and the Anoual Formation of Morocco.

The youngests fossils of Dryolestidans in the Northern Hemisphere are the dryolestids Crusafontia cuencana from Uña and the Camarillas Formation, Spain and Minutolestes submersus and Beckumia sinemeckelia from Balve, Germany, which all date to the Barremian-Aptian stages of the Early Cretaceous, though a fragmentary lower molar from the late Cretaceous Mesaverde Formation in Wyoming has been tentatively attributed to Dryolestidae. In South America, by contrast, Meridiolestida thrived in the Late Cretaceous, diversifying in a myriad of forms such as the saber-toothed Cronopio and the herbivorous mesungulatids, becoming some of the most ecologically diverse Mesozoic South American mammals. Groebertherium from the Late Cretaceous of South America has a more primitive morphology similar to Northern Hemisphere dryolestids and may be more closely related to the North Hemisphere dryloestidans than to Meridiolestida.

With the advent of the Cenozoic, dryolestoids declined drastically in diversity, with only the large dog-sized herbivore Peligrotherium being known from the Palaeocene. The exact reasons for this decline are not clear; most likely they simply did not recover from the K-Pg event. Nonetheless, meridiolestidans would continue to survive until the Miocene, from when Necrolestes is known; a gap of 50 million years exists between it and Peligrotherium. A tooth fragment, now lost, found in the Eocene aged La Meseta Formation of the Antarctic peninsula, is possibly a meridiolestidan.

== Taxonomy ==
A phylogenetic analysis conducted by Rougier et al. (2012) indicated that meridiolestidans might not be members of Dryolestoidea but instead slightly more closely related to the placental mammals, marsupials and amphitheriids. Paurodontids were also recovered as not belonging to Dryolestida, but instead as a sister group of Meridiolestida in this analysis. An analysis conducted by Averianov, Martin and Lopatin (2013) did not recover meridiolestidans as members of Dryolestida as well, but it found them to be the sister group of spalacotheriid "symmetrodonts" instead. However, paurodontids were recovered as members of Dryolestida in this analysis. On the other hand, an analysis conducted by Chimento, Agnolin and Novas (2012) did recover meridiolestidans as members of Dryolestoidea.

Cladogram after Lasseron and colleagues (2022), which found Donodontidae and Meridiolestida unrelated to Dryolestida:

- Cladotheria
  - Meridiolestida
  - - Dryolestida
      - - - Anthracolestes
          - Tathiodon
        - - Euthlastus
          - Paurodon
      - - Drescheratherium
        - Henkelotherium
        - Dryolestidae
          - Amblotherium
          - - - Dryolestes
              - Laolestes
            - - - Krebsotherium
                - Thereuodon
              - - Guimarotodus
                - - Crusafontia
                  - Hercynodon
    - - Donodontidae
      - Prototribosphenida
        - Vincelestes
        - - Amphitherium
          - - - Amphibetulimus
              - Nanolestes
            - - Palaeoxonodon
              - Zatheria
                - - Arguimus
                  - Peramus
                - Tribosphenida
