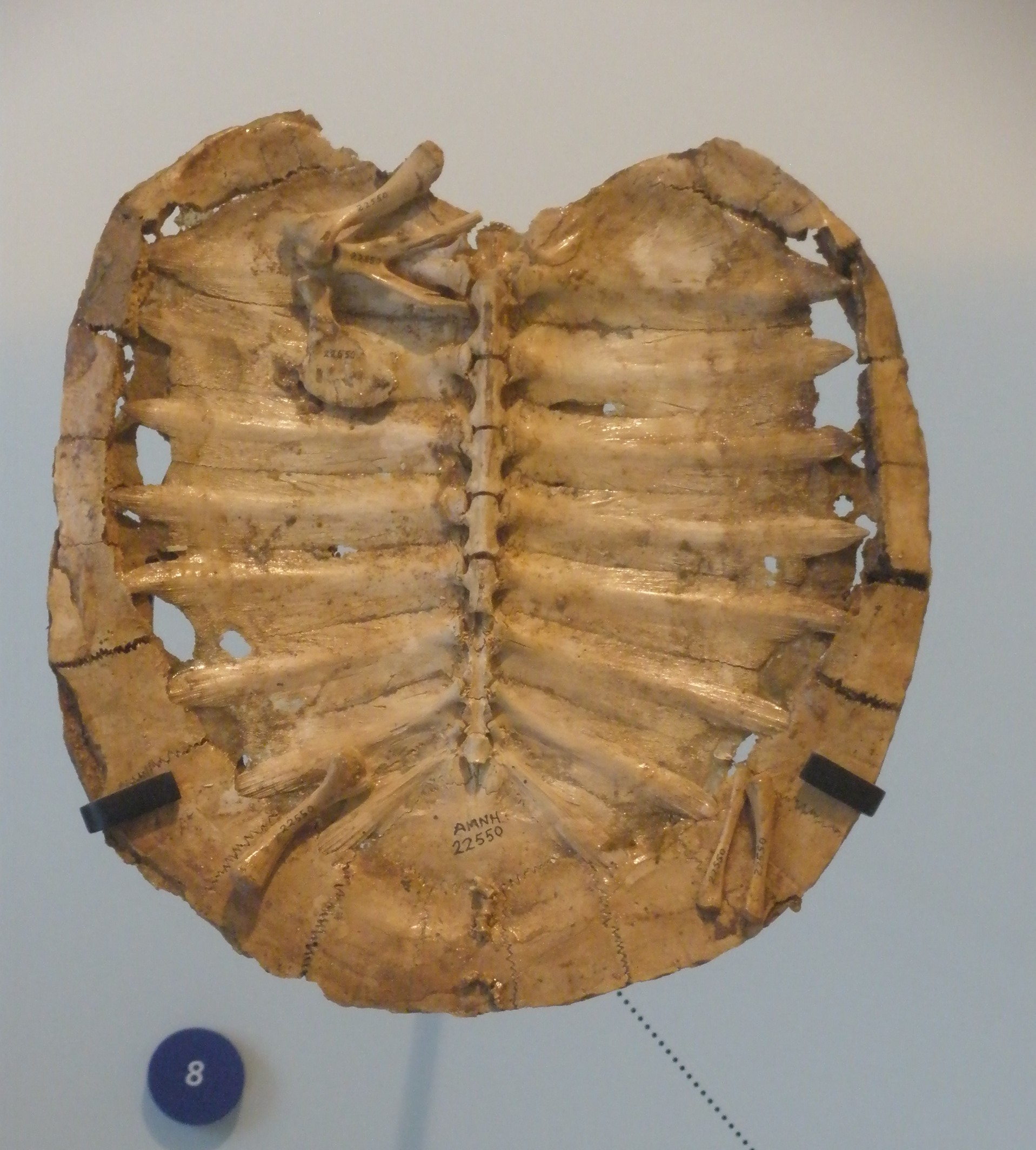
- Araripemydidae (Araripemys barretoi)

Scientific classification
- Kingdom: Animalia
- Phylum: Chordata
- Class: Reptilia
- Order: Testudines
- Suborder: Pleurodira
- Hyperfamily: Pelomedusoides
- Family: †Araripemydidae; Price, 1973

Genera
- Araripemys; Taquetochelys

= Araripemydidae =

Araripemydidae Temporal range: Aptian–Cenomanian

Extinct family of turtles

Araripemydidae is a family of freshwater aquatic turtles belonging to the order Pleurodira (side-necked turtles), known from the Early Cretaceous of South America and Africa. The family contains two recognised monotypic genera, Araripemys and Taquetochelys, from the Santana Group of Brazil and the Elrhaz Formation of Niger, respectively, which date to the Aptian-Albian stages of the Early Cretaceous. They are consider to be the most basal lineage within the Pelomedusoides. They are thought to have been specialised suction feeders. Laganemys was named in 2013 but was later determined to be synonymous with Taquetochelys.
