= Brancatherulum =

Brancatherulum Temporal range: Late Jurassic Kimmeridgian–Tithonian
- Holotype dentary

Scientific classification
- Kingdom: Animalia
- Phylum: Chordata
- Class: Mammalia
- Clade: Trechnotheria
- Clade: Cladotheria
- Genus: †Brancatherulum; Dietrich, 1927
- Species: †B. tendagurense

Binomial name
- †Brancatherulum tendagurense Dietrich, 1927

Extinct family of mammals

Brancatherulum is an extinct genus of Late Jurassic (Kimmeridgian - Tithonian) mammal from the Tendaguru Formation of Lindi Region of Tanzania. It is based on a single toothless dentary 21 mm in length. It is currently considered either a stem-zatherian or dryolestidan.

== See also ==
- Prehistoric mammal
  - List of prehistoric mammals
