= Anthracolestes =

Anthracolestes Temporal range: Bathonian

Scientific classification
- Kingdom: Animalia
- Phylum: Chordata
- Class: Mammalia
- Order: †Dryolestida
- Family: †Dryolestidae
- Genus: †Anthracolestes
- Species: †A. sergeii

Binomial name
- †Anthracolestes sergeii Averianov et al., 2014

Extinct genus of mammals

Anthracolestes is an extinct genus of dryolestid that lived during the Bathonian stage of the Middle Jurassic epoch.

== Distribution ==
Anthracolestes sergeii is known from the Itat Formation of Russia.
