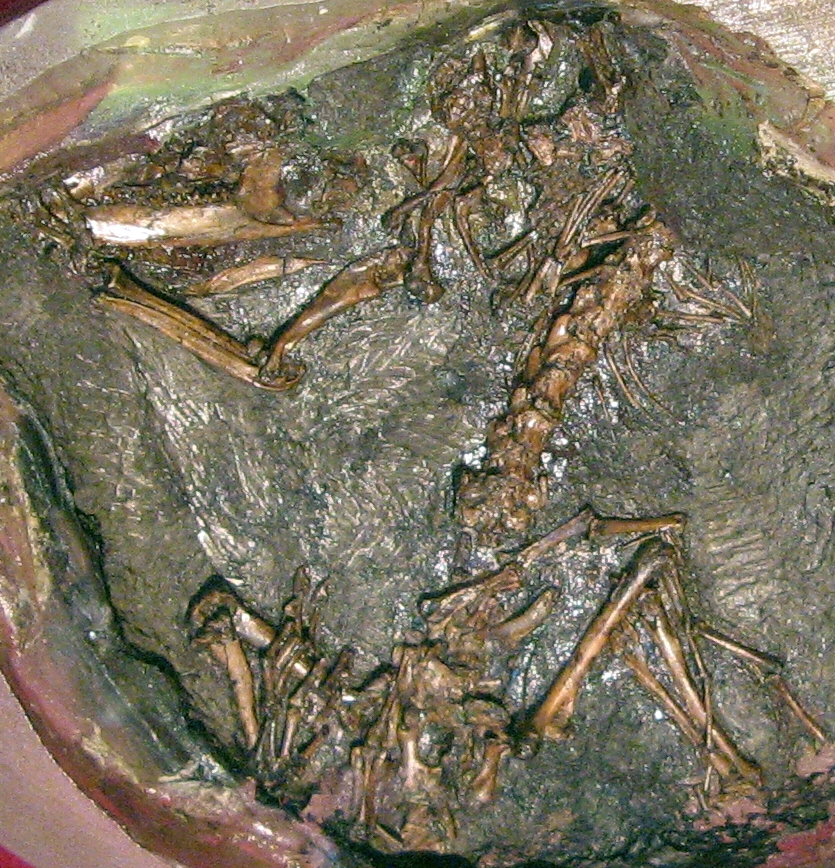
- Fossil of the basal cladotherian Henkelotherium guimarotae

Scientific classification
- Kingdom: Animalia
- Phylum: Chordata
- Class: Mammalia
- Clade: Trechnotheria
- Clade: Cladotheria; McKenna, 1975

Subgroups
- †Meridiolestida; †Dryolestida; †Donodontidae; †Brancatherulum; Prototribosphenida; †Arguimus; †Mozomus; †Nanolestes; †Vincelestes; †Tendagurutherium?; †Amphitheriidae; Zatheria; †Peramuridae; Tribosphenida

= Cladotheria =

Cladotheres Temporal range: Middle Jurassic–Recent

Clade of mammals

Cladotheria is a clade (sometimes ranked as a legion) of mammals. It contains modern therian mammals (marsupials and placental mammals) and several extinct groups, such as the "dryolestoids", amphitheriids and peramurids. The clade was named in 1975 by Malcolm McKenna. In 2002, it was defined as a node-based taxon containing "the common ancestor of dryolestids and living therians, plus all its descendants". A different, stem-based definition was given in 2013, in which Cladotheria contains all taxa that are closer to Mus musculus (the house mouse) than to the "symmetrodont" Spalacotherium tricuspidens.

Cladotheria incorporates a set of nested mammal clades culminating in Tribosphenida (also known as Boreosphenida), mammals with fully tribosphenic teeth such as therians and a few of their closest relatives. The clade Prototribosphenida includes "the common ancestor of Vincelestes and living therians, plus all of its descendants". Apart from tribosphenids, Prototribosphenida also includes amphitheriids and peramurids, as well as a few isolated genera such as Vincelestes. It excludes the various basal cladotherian groups which have been combined under the label "dryolestoids". The clade Zatheria is even more exclusive, restricted to solely peramurids and tribosphenids. Zatheria is defined as "the common ancestor of Peramus and living marsupials and placental mammals, plus all of its descendants".

== Description ==
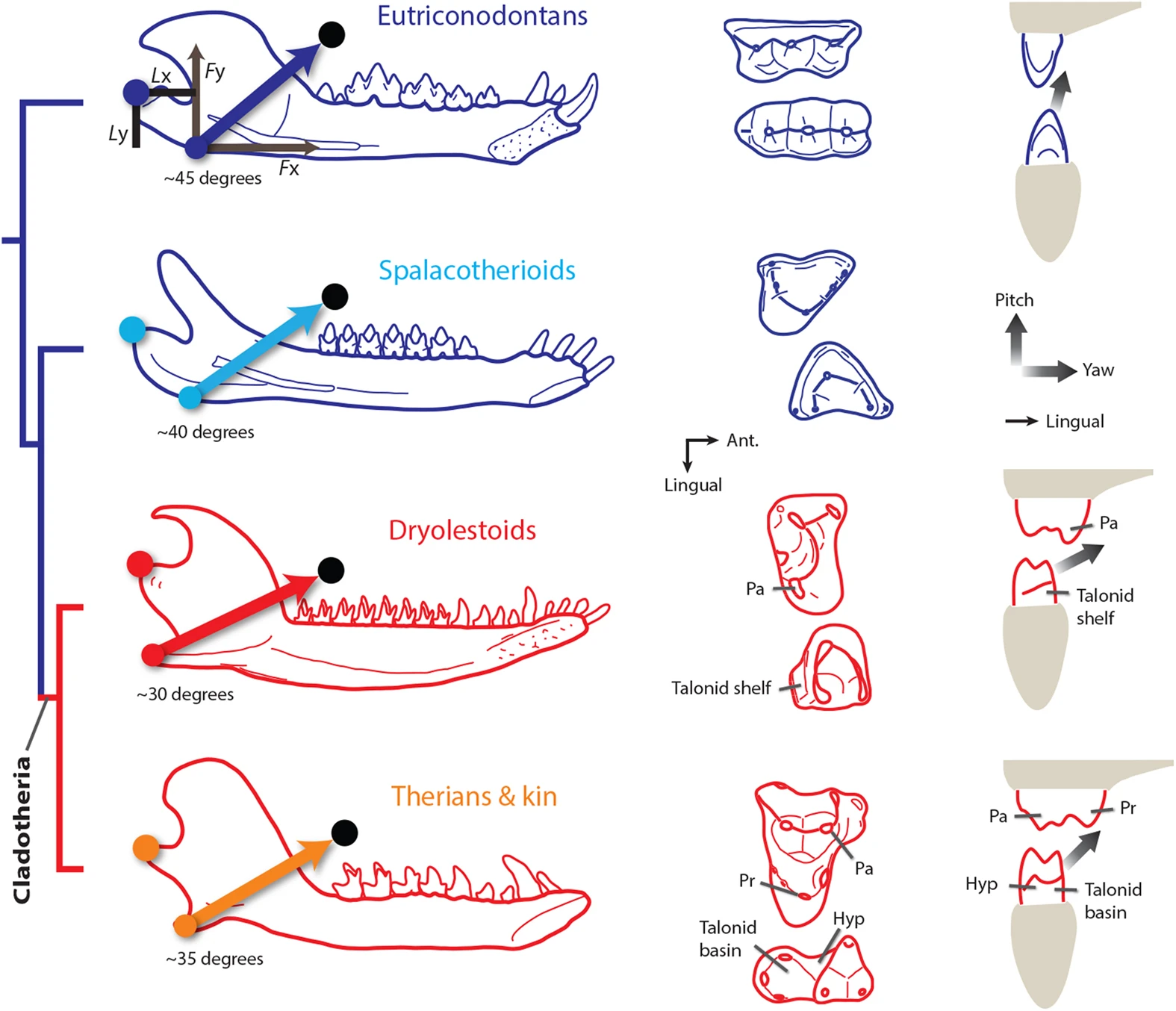
Comparison of the jaw and tooth morphology of cladotherians and other mammals.

Early cladotherians can be distinguished from other mammals by a number of derived traits (apomorphies). Their teeth differed from those of the "symmetrodonts" by the evolution of a talonid shelf (hypoflexid) on the lower molars, which occluded with the paracone of the corresponding upper molars.

A true talonid basin, allowing for the crushing and grinding of food, was however absent in early-diverging groups like the dryolestoids, amphitheriids and peramurids.

Cladotherians are also distinguished by a backwards-pointing angular process at the rear end of the dentary bone, below the jaw joint. The shape of this process indicates that early cladotherians had a more transverse (side-to-side) chewing motion than more basal mammal groups. The connection of the middle ear bones to the dentary through an ossified Meckel's cartilage appears to have been lost in cladotherians, but a cartilaginous connection may have been retained in early-diverging groups.

== Phylogeny ==
Cladogram after Panciroli et al. 2018:

- Cladotheria
  - Dryolestida
  - - Vincelestes
    - - Nanolestes
      - Arguimus
      - - Peramus
        - Amphitheriidae
      - - Kielantherium
        - - Aegialodon
          - Theria (modern placentals, marsupials, and relatives)

The cladogram after Lasseron et al 2022:

- Cladotheria
  - Meridiolestida
  - - Dryolestida
    - - Donodontidae
      - Prototribosphenida
        - Vincelestes
        - - Amphitherium
          - - - Amphibetulimus
              - Nanolestes
            - - Palaeoxonodon
              - Zatheria
                - - Arguimus
                  - Peramus
                - Tribosphenida

Cladogram after Magallanes et al, 2024:

- Cladotheria
  - Dryolestida
  - - Paurodon
    - Drescheratherium
    - Foxraptor
    - Meridiolestida
    - Zatheria
      - Amphitheriidae
      - Peramus
      - Vincelestes
      - - Kielantherium
        - - Pappotherium
          - Eutheria (placentals and relatives)
          - Metatheria (marsupials and relatives)
