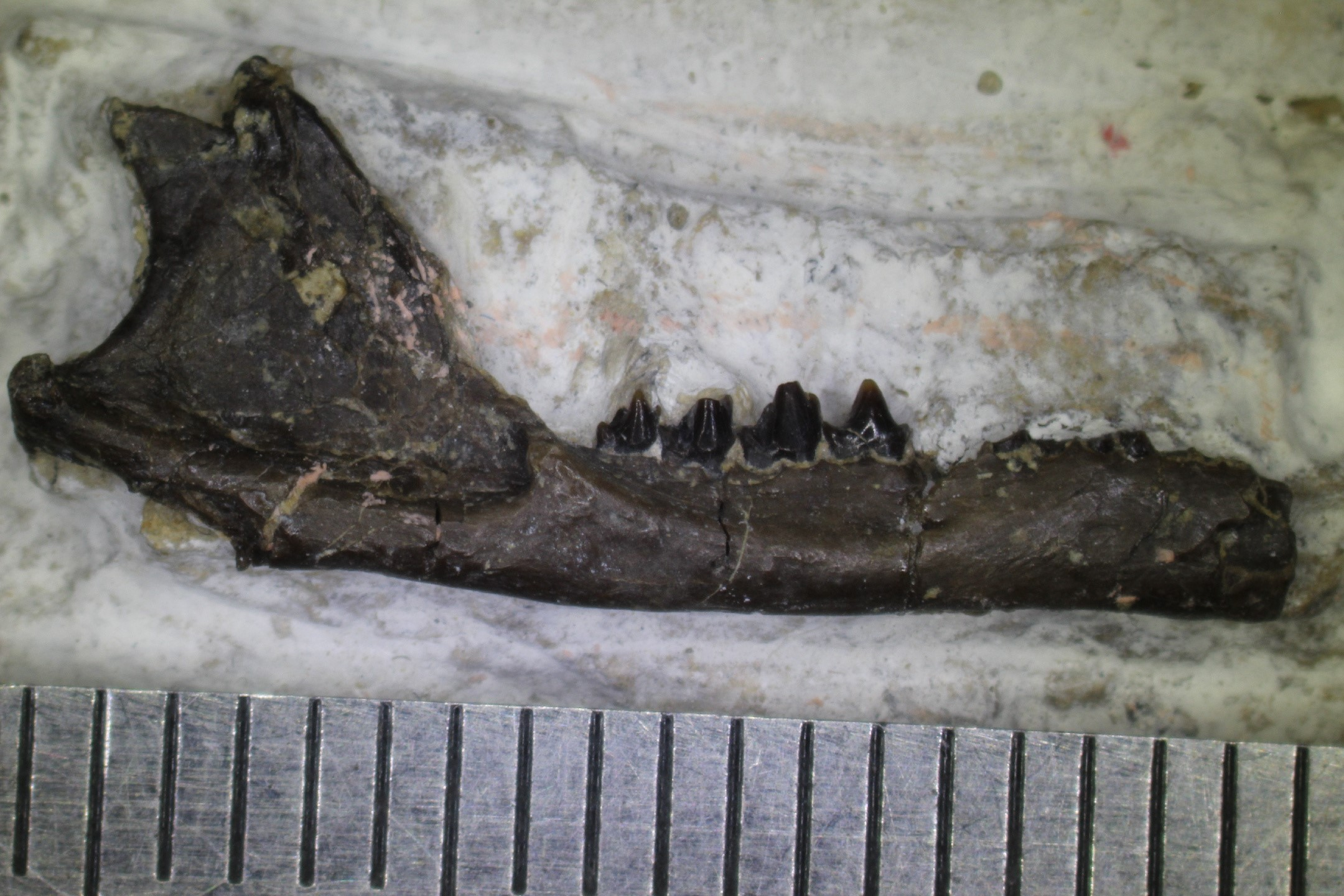
- Peramus tenuirostris NHMUK PV OR 47742
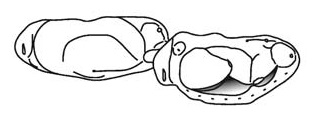
- P4 and P5 of Peramus tenuirostris

Scientific classification
- Kingdom: Animalia
- Phylum: Chordata
- Class: Mammalia
- Order: †Peramura
- Family: †Peramuridae
- Genus: †Peramus; Owen, 1871

= Peramus =

Peramus Temporal range: Tithonian–Berriasian

Extinct family of mammals

Peramus is an extinct genus of cladotherian mammal. It lived in the Late Jurassic and Early Cretaceous of Europe and North Africa.

== Species ==
There are three known extinct species in the genus:

- Peramus dubius Lulworth Formation, United Kingdom, Berriasian
- Peramus minor Lulworth Formation, United Kingdom, Berriasian
- Peramus tenuirostris Lulworth Formation, United Kingdom, Berriasian

Additionally, indeterminate remains are known from the Ksar Metlili Formation of Morocco, dating to the Tithonian-Berriasian, and the Angeac-Charente bonebed in France, dating to the Berriasian.

== Phylogeny ==
Peramus is generally considered an advanced cladotherian. In the analysis performed by Panciroli and colleagues (2018), Peramus was recovered as within a clade also including Palaeoxonodon and Amphitherium, as derived members of Cladotheria. Peramus, Palaeoxonodon and Amphitherium were united by the shared traits of "convergence of the Meckel’s sulcus with the ventral border of the mandible; and possessing open rooted postcanines." but the placement of Peramus as a more advanced cladotherian cannot be ruled out. In a 2018 analysis by Bi and colleagues, Peramus was recovered in a clade with Palaeoxonodon and Nanolestes also as advanced cladotherians. In a 2022 study of cladotherian relationships, it was recovered as a member of Zatheria, closer to Theria than either Palaeoxonodon and Nanolestes.
