= Thereuodon =

Thereuodon Temporal range: Berriasian

Scientific classification
- Kingdom: Animalia
- Phylum: Chordata
- Class: Mammalia
- Order: †Symmetrodonta
- Family: †Thereuodontidae; Sigogneau-Russel & Ensom, 1998
- Genus: †Thereuodon; Sigogneau-Russell, 1989

Species
- Thereuodon dahmani Sigogneau-Russell, 1989 (type); Thereuodon taraktes Sigogneau-Russell & Ensom, 1998

Extinct family of mammals

Thereuodon is a genus of extinct mammal known from the Early Cretaceous of southern England, Morocco and France. The type species, named by Denise Sigogneau-Russell in 1989 for teeth from the earliest Cretaceous Ksar Metlili Formation of Morocco, is Thereuodon dahmani, while the referred species named by Sigogneau-Russell and Paul Ensom for teeth from the Lulworth Formation of England is Thereuodon taraktes. The two species are separated by a break in the cingulum in T. dahmani, a more obtuse medial crest in T. taraktes, a duller stylocone in T. taraktes, a "c" cuspule in T. dahmani, and a reduced facet A in T. taraktes. The genus Thereuodon is the only taxon in the symmetrodont family Thereuodontidae, which may be closely related to Spalacotheriidae. A tooth referred to T. cf. taraktes is known from the Berriasian aged Angeac-Charente bonebed of France.
