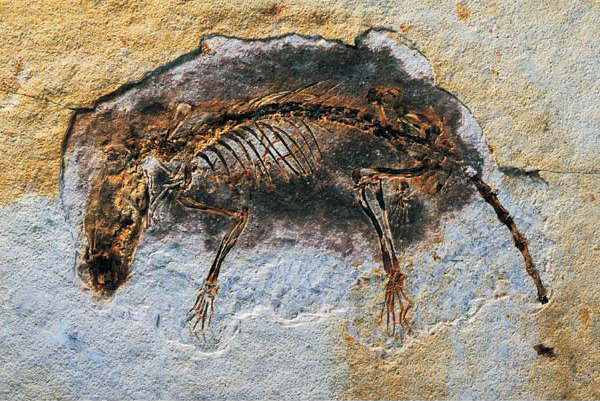
- Eomaia fossil
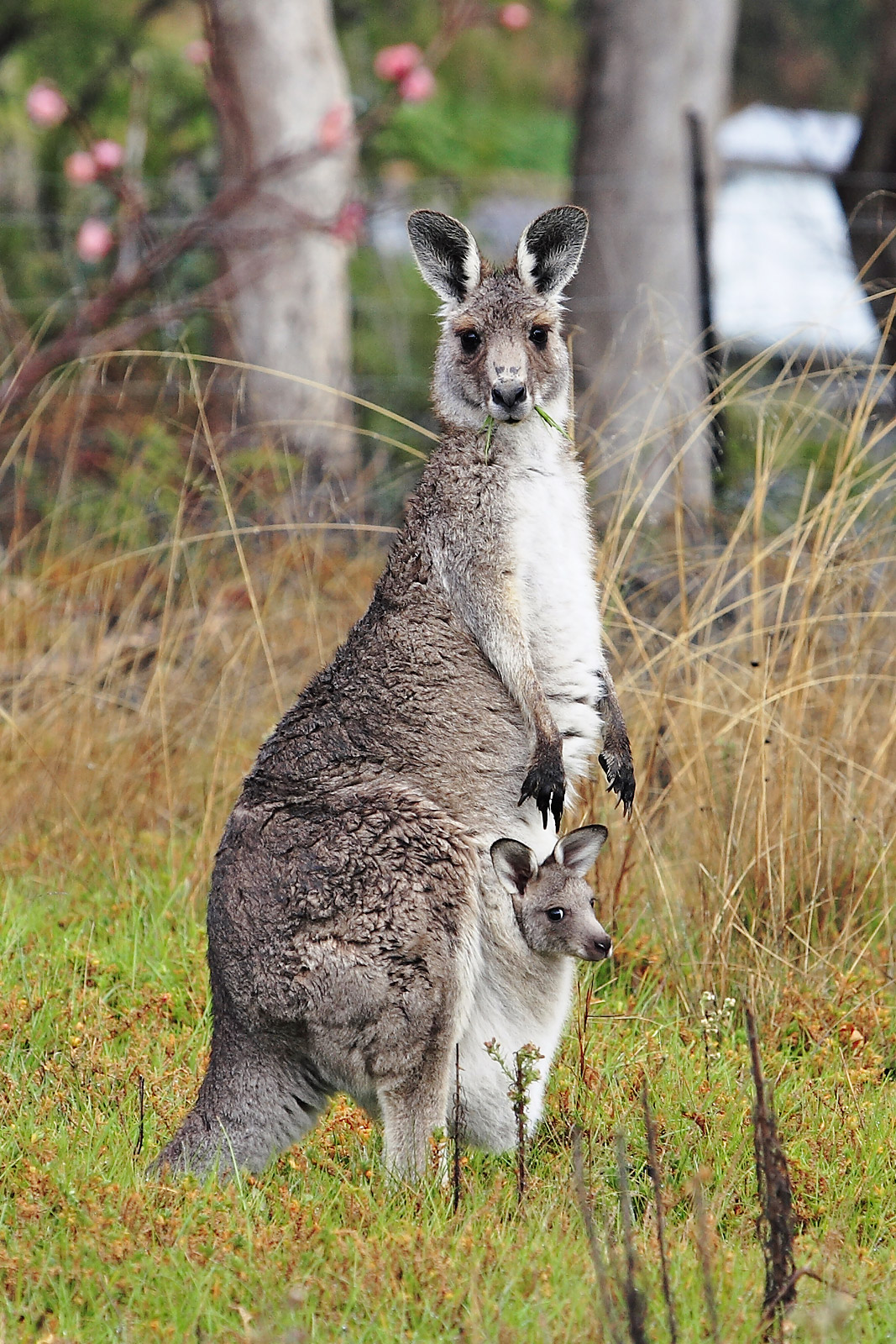
- Kangaroo with her joey

Scientific classification
- Kingdom: Animalia
- Phylum: Chordata
- Class: Mammalia
- Clade: Zatheria
- Clade: Tribosphenida; McKenna, 1975

Clades
- †Henosferidae?; †Ambondro?; †Ausktribosphenidae?; †Bishopidae?; Boreosphenida? Luo et al., 2001; †Aegialodontia; †Eomaia; †Hypomylos; †Tribotherium; Theria

= Tribosphenida =

Tribosphenida Temporal range: Early Cretaceous–Recent

Infralegion of mammals

Tribosphenida is a clade of mammals that includes the ancestor of Hypomylos, Aegialodontia and Theria (the last common ancestor of marsupials and placentals plus all of its descendants). It belongs to the group Zatheria. The current definition of Tribosphenida is more or less synonymous with Boreosphenida.

== Characteristics ==
Tribosphenid mammals were originally grouped on the basis of triangular or V-shaped (tribosphenic) molars. The relationship of the also tribosphenic australosphenidans, a group of mammals from the Jurassic-Cretaceous of the Southern Hemisphere often suggested to be close relatives of living monotremes, has been questioned, and it has been argued that they developed tribosphenic molars independently from those of "true" tribosphenidans. Some authors have alternatively continued to argue that non-monotreme australosphenidans are in fact true tribosphenidans unrelated to monotremes. "True" unambiguous members of Tribosphenida are placed as part of the clade Boreosphenida, united by characteristics such as the lack of a mesial cingulid and of a triangulated trigonid on the last premolar. They are also united by postcranial features such as the presence of a modern ear (though this too has evolved independently in many other groups, like monotremes), modern shoulder blades, and several features of the hindlimb.

== Phylogeny ==
Below is a cladogram showing one hypothesis of mammal relationships based on Rowe (1988) and McKenna and Bell (1997):

- Mammaliaformes
  - †Morganucodontidae
  - Mammalia
    - Prototheria→Monotremata
    - Theriiformes
      - †Allotheria→†Multituberculata
      - †Triconodonta
      - Holotheria
        - †Kuehneotheria
        - Trechnotheria
          - †Symmetrodonta
          - Cladotheria
            - †Dryolestoidea
            - Zatheria
              - †Peramuridae
              - Tribosphenida
                - †Aegialodontia
                - Theria
                  - Metatheria→Marsupialia
                  - Eutheria→Placentalia

== Boreosphenida ==
Boreosphenida (from boreas, "northern wind" and sphen, "wedge") were early mammals that originated in the Northern Hemisphere and had tribosphenic molars (three-cusped cheek teeth). In boreosphenidans, the mandibular angle is placed posteriorly and the primitive postdentary trough (hole in the mandible) is absent (in contrast to Kuehneotheriidae, Eupantotheria, and Australosphenida.) They share the tribosphenic molars with the Australosphenida but differ from them by having cingulid cuspules but lacking a continuous mesial cingulid. Boreosphenidans also lack the triangulated trigonid on the last premolar found in Early Cretaceous mammals. They differ from Shuotherium (a monotreme-relative) in having the talonid placed posterior to the trigonid (like in modern tribosphenic mammals) in the lower molars, but upper molars similar to those of Shuotherium.

The oldest boreosphenidans are from the Berriasian (~145-140 mya). They were restricted to the Northern Hemisphere during the Early Cretaceous, but spread to South America and India during the end of the Cretaceous.

An alternative hypothesis is offered by Flannery and colleagues, who view part of australosphenidans as members of Tribosphenida (excluding monotremes and others australosphenidans with Steropodon, which they consider to be an unrelated group), with Barremian-Aptian Australian Bisphopidae as the sister taxon to all Northern Hemisphere Theria (Boreosphenida).

On the other hand, the study that cites Flannery's article, given in 2024, maintains Ambondro as a relative of Monotremata. Implying support for the Australosphenida-Boreosphenida hypothesis. It may also be that both studies are right, consequently Tribosphenida would be a monophyletic group that contains the crown group Mammalia. Australosphenida possible paraphyly.
