= Aegialodon =

Aegialodon Temporal range: Valanginian

Scientific classification
- Domain: Eukaryota
- Kingdom: Animalia
- Phylum: Chordata
- Class: Mammalia
- Clade: †Aegialodontia
- Family: †Aegialodontidae
- Genus: †Aegialodon; Kermack, Lees and Mussett, 1965
- Species: †A. dawsoni

Binomial name
- †Aegialodon dawsoni Kermack, Lees and Mussett, 1965

Extinct family of mammals

Aegialodon dawsoni is an extinct mammal from the early Cretaceous, known from fossilised teeth discovered in the Wadhurst Clay Formation (dating to about 136 million years ago) near Cliff End, Hastings, East Sussex.
