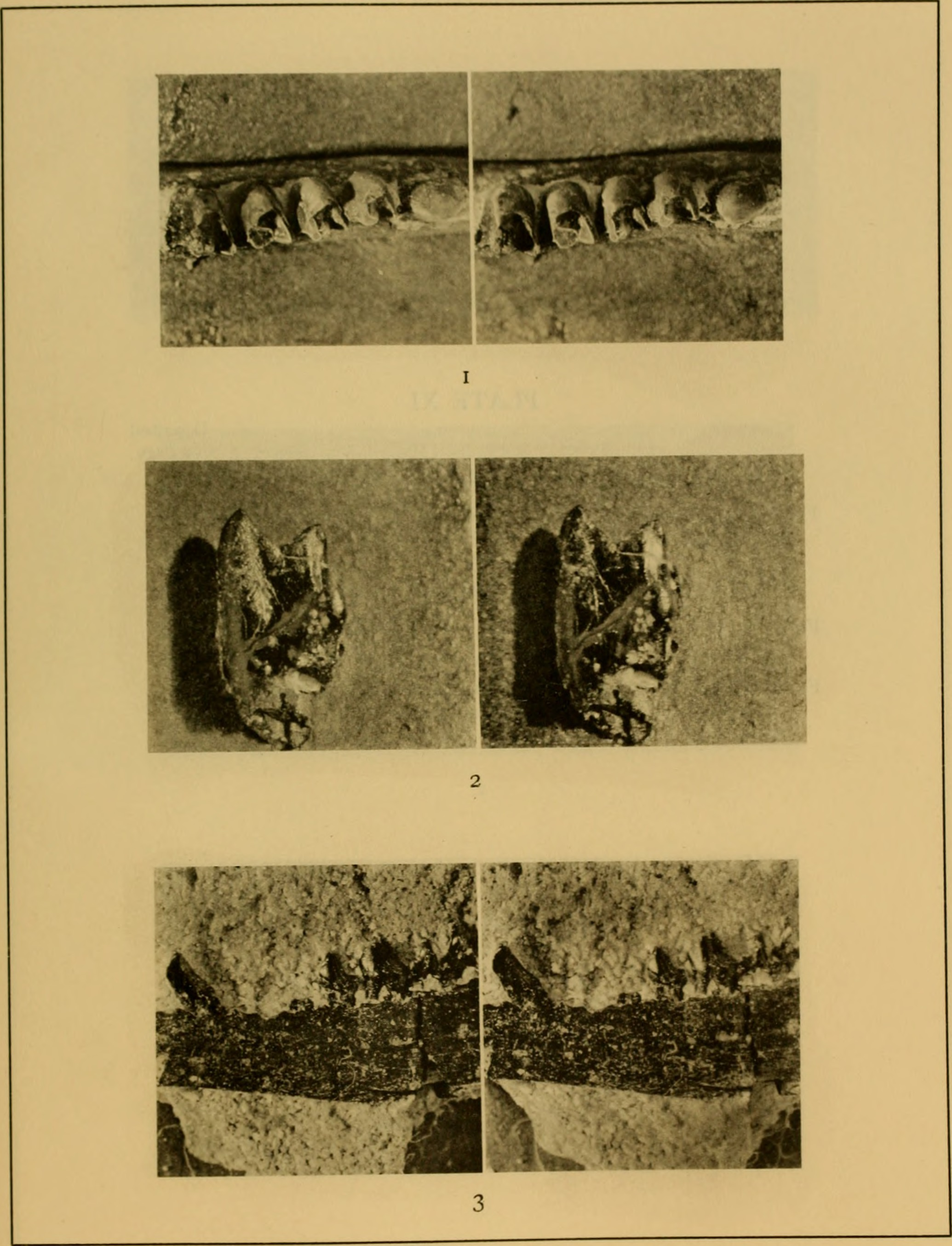
- Jaws and teeth of Laolestes seen from different angles

Scientific classification
- Kingdom: Animalia
- Phylum: Chordata
- Class: Mammalia
- Order: †Dryolestida
- Family: †Dryolestidae
- Genus: †Laolestes; Simpson, 1927

Type species
- †Laolestes eminens Simpson, 1927

Other species
- †L. andresi Martin, 1999; †L. goodrichi (Simpson, 1929 [originally Melanodon]); †L. hodsoni (Clemens & Lees, 1971 [originally Melanodon]); †L. oweni (Simpson, 1927 [originally Melanodon])

Synonyms
- Malthacolestes Simpson, 1927; Melanodon Simpson, 1927

= Laolestes =

Laolestes Temporal range: Tithonian-Valanginian, 156.3–132.6 Ma

Extinct family of mammals

Laolestes is an extinct genus of dryolestid mammal. Fossil remains are known from the Morrison Formation, in stratigraphic zones 5 and 6., the Late Jurassic of Portugal, and Early Cretaceous Wadhurst Clay of the United Kingdom.

== See also ==
- The World After Dinosaurs
- Prehistoric mammal
  - List of prehistoric mammals
- Paleobiota of the Morrison Formation
