= Drescheratherium =

Drescheratherium Temporal range: Late Jurassic Kimmeridgian

Scientific classification
- Domain: Eukaryota
- Kingdom: Animalia
- Phylum: Chordata
- Class: Mammalia
- Order: †Dryolestida
- Family: †Paurodontidae
- Genus: †Drescheratherium; Krebs, 1998
- Species: †D. acutum

Binomial name
- †Drescheratherium acutum Krebs, 1998

Extinct family of mammals

Drescheratherium is an extinct genus of mammal from the Late Jurassic (Kimmeridgian) Camadas de Guimarota of Leiria, Portugal. It is represented by fairly complete upper jaws with teeth. It bears elongated upper canines, though not to the extent another dryolestoid, Cronopio, does.

== See also ==
- Prehistoric mammal
  - List of prehistoric mammals
