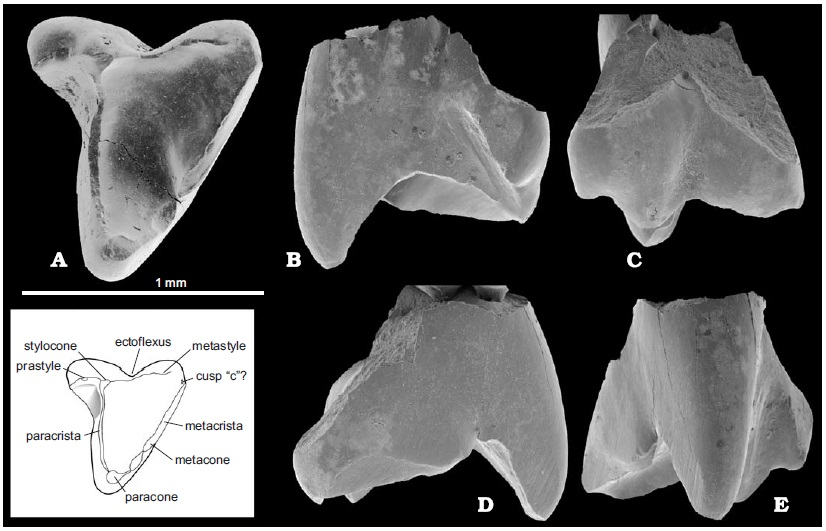
- Holotype of C. amoae, now C. cuencana

Scientific classification
- Kingdom: Animalia
- Phylum: Chordata
- Class: Mammalia
- Order: †Dryolestida
- Family: †Dryolestidae
- Genus: †Crusafontia; Henkel & Krebs, 1969

Type species
- Crusafontia cuencana Henkel & Krebs, 1969

Synonyms
- Crusafontia amoae Cuenca-Bescos et al., 2011

= Crusafontia =

Crusafontia Temporal range: Barremian

Extinct family of mammals

Crusafontia is an extinct genus of mammal from the Cretaceous Camarillas, El Castellar and La Huérguina Formations of Spain. The name of the animal was given in honour of the Spanish paleontologist Miquel Crusafont Pairó.

Crusafontia is estimated to have been around 10 cm (3.9 in)long, though only two teeth (an upper molar right P5) and a mandible have ever been found. In one study on Mesozoic mammal mandibles, it plots with carnivorous rather than insectivorous or herbivorous species.

In 2011 a second species of Crusafontia was named, C. amoae, based on two upper molar teeth from Galve. However, this was synonymised with the original species in 2021.
