= Amblotherium =

Amblotherium Temporal range: Late Jurassic-Berriasian

Scientific classification
- Kingdom: Animalia
- Phylum: Chordata
- Class: Mammalia
- Order: †Dryolestida
- Family: †Dryolestidae
- Subfamily: †Dryolestinae
- Genus: †Amblotherium; Owen, 1871

Species
- Amblotherium pusillum (Owen, 1866) (type); Ambolotherium apiarium Connelly et al., 2026; Ambolotherium debilis Marsh, 1881; Ambolotherium megistodon Foster et al., 2020; Ambolotherium nanum Owen, 1871; Amblotherium gracilis Marsh, 1879; Ambolotherium soricinum Owen, 1871

Synonyms
- A. pusillum: Stylodon pusillus Owen, 1866; Amblotherium soricinum Owen, 1871; A. gracile: Comotherium richi Prothero, 1981; Kepolestes debilis Simpson, 1927; Miccylotyrans minimus Simpson 1927

Extinct family of mammals

Amblotherium is an extinct genus of Late Jurassic and Early Cretaceous mammal. The type species Amblotherium pusillum is from the Lulworth Formation of southern England, while the referred species Amblotherium gracilis is from stratigraphic zones 2, 3 and 5 of the Morrison Formation of the US.

== See also ==
- Paleobiota of the Morrison Formation
