= Nanolestes =

Nanolestes Temporal range: Late Jurassic

Scientific classification
- Kingdom: Animalia
- Phylum: Chordata
- Class: Mammalia
- Order: †Amphitheriida
- Family: †Amphitheriidae
- Genus: †Nanolestes; Martin, 2002

Species
- Nanolestes mackennai; Nanolestes krusati; Nanolestes drescherae

Extinct genus of mammals

Nanolestes is an extinct genus of mammals in the order Amphitheriida from the Late Jurassic of Eurasia. Two species, N. krusati and N. drescherae are known from the Alcobaça Formation in Portugal. Another species, N. mackennai, was described from the Oxfordian aged Qigu Formation of China by Thomas Martin, Alexander O. Averianov and Hans-Ulrich Pfretzschner in 2010.
