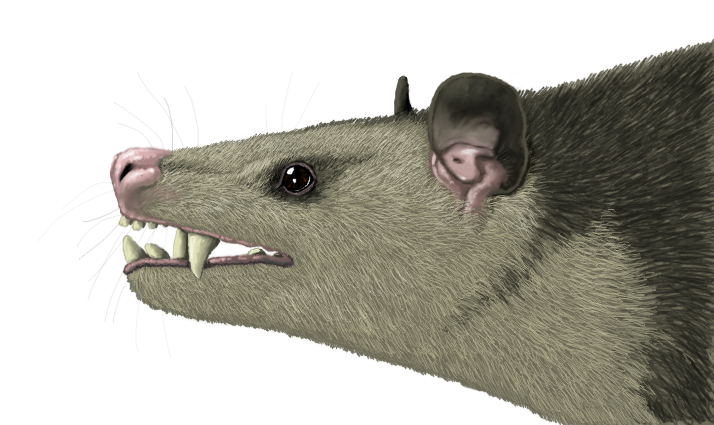
- Artist's restoration

Scientific classification
- Kingdom: Animalia
- Phylum: Chordata
- Class: Mammalia
- Clade: Prototribosphenida
- Family: †Vincelestidae; Bonaparte, 1986
- Genus: †Vincelestes; Bonaparte, 1986
- Species: †V. neuquenianus

Binomial name
- †Vincelestes neuquenianus Bonaparte, 1986

= Vincelestes =

Vincelestes Temporal range: Barremian-Early Aptian ~130–123 Ma

Extinct family of mammals

Vincelestes ("Vince's thief") is an extinct genus of mammal that lived in what is now South America during the Early Cretaceous. It is closely related to modern therian mammals as part of Cladotheria.

== Description ==
Vincelestes neuquenianus is the only species known to date. Specimens were found in La Amarga Formation of southern Neuquén Province, Argentina. The remains of only nine individuals were recovered from this site.

The back teeth of Vincelestes were similar to those of therians in that they were capable of cutting and grinding. This enabled them to process food more efficiently.

== Diet ==
In one study on Mesozoic mammal mandibles, Vincelestes plots with herbivorous and omnivorous taxa.

== Phylogeny ==
Although not the direct ancestor of therians, Vincelestes is important because it gives an idea of what the ancestor of both placental and marsupial mammals might have looked like, and also gives an indication of when these mammals may have originated.

Some studies inversely recovered the genus as an australosphenidan, although current thought places Vincelestes as sister to marsupials and placental mammals.
