= Alcobaça Formation =

Geological formation in Portugal

- Stratigraphic range: Oxfordian-Kimmeridgian; ~156.9–152.5 Ma
- Type: Geological formation
- Sub-units: Camadas de Guimarota
- Underlies: Lourinhã Formation
- Overlies: Montejunto Formation

Lithology
- Primary: Marl
- Other: Mudstone, coal, siltstone, limestone, sandstone

Location
- Coordinates: 39.6°N 9.0°W
- Approximate paleocoordinates: 33.7°N 1.6°E
- Region: Estremadura, Leiria, Lisboa
- Country: Portugal
- Extent: Lusitanian Basin

Type section
- Named for: Alcobaça, Portugal
- Named by: Choffat
- Year defined: 1885
- Alcobaça Formation (Portugal)

The Alcobaça Formation, previously known as the Guimarota Formation and also known as the Consolação Unit, is a geological formation in Portugal. It dates back to the Kimmeridgian stage of the Late Jurassic. It is an important source of information on the diversity of Late Jurassic mammals. Many of the fossils were collected from the now disused and flooded Camadas de Guimarota coal mine.

== Vertebrate paleofauna ==
Dinosaur eggs are geographically located in Lisbon District, Portugal. Dinosaur tracks are geographically located in Leiria District, Portugal.

=== Chondrichthyes ===
Chondrichthyes of the Alcobaça Formation
| Genus | Species | Location | Stratigraphic Position | Material | Notes | Images |
|---|---|---|---|---|---|---|
| Hybodus | Indeterminate | Guimarota | | Isolated Teeth | | |
| Asteracanthus | A. biformatus | Guimarota | | isolated teeth, fin-spine and a head-spine | | |
| Polyacrodus | Indeterminate | Guimarota | | Isolated teeth and a fin-spine | | |
| Orectolobiformes | Indeterminate | Guimarota | | One isolated tooth | | |
| Batomorphi | Indeterminate | Guimarota | | Isolated teeth | | |

=== Osteichthyes ===
Osteichthyes of the Alcobaça Formation
| Genus | Species | Location | Stratigraphic Position | Material | Notes | Images |
|---|---|---|---|---|---|---|
| Guimarotaichthys | G. problematicus | Guimarota | | | A non-teleost bony fish | |
| Macromesodon | Indeterminate | Guimarota | | Isolated teeth | | |
| Proscinetes | Indeterminate | Guimarota | | Isolated teeth and prearticulars | | |
| "Lepidotes" | Indeterminate | Guimarota | | isolated lateral teeth, lower jaws, ganoid scales and isolated skull bones | Two species of different size can be distinguished from the fossil material | |
| Ionoscopidae | Indeterminate | Guimarota | | Isolated teeth | | |
| Macrosemiidae | Indeterminate | Guimarota | | Isolated grasping tooth | | |
| Caturus? | Indeterminate | Guimarota | | Isolated Teeth and a partial skull | | |
| Pachycormidae | Indeterminate | Guimarota | | | | |

=== Amphibians ===
Albanerpetontids are one of the most numerous faunal components of the Guimarota mine with around 9000 isolated remains, including parts of the skull and limbs. Remains of indeterminate salamanders and frogs are also present but far rarer.

Amphibians of the Alcobaça Formation
| Genus | Species | Location | Stratigraphic position | Material | Notes | Images |
|---|---|---|---|---|---|---|
| cf. Celtedens | Indeterminate | Porto Pinheiro | | | Albanerpetontid | |
| cf. Marmorerpeton | Indeterminate | Guimarota | | | Indeterminate salamander | |
| Nabia | N. civiscientrix | Guimarota | | | Albanerpetontid | |
| Discoglossidae | Indeterminate | Guimarota | | | Indeterminate frog | |

=== Choristoderes ===
Choristoderes of the Alcobaça Formation
| Genus | Species | Location | Stratigraphic position | Material | Notes | Images |
|---|---|---|---|---|---|---|
| Cteniogenys | Indeterminate | Guimarota | | | | |

=== Ornithischians ===
Indeterminate euornithopod remains located in Lisbon District. Indeterminate stegosaurid remains present in Lisbon District.

Ornithischians of the Alcobaça Formation
| Genus | Species | District | Stratigraphic position | Abundance | Notes | Images |
|---|---|---|---|---|---|---|
| Dacentrurus | D. armatus | Lisboa | | | | |
| Trimucrodon | T. cuneatus | Lisboa | | | Later determined to be indeterminate ornithischian remains. | |

=== Saurischians ===
Indeterminate sauropod remains located in Leiria and Lisboa.

Saurischians of the Alcobaça Formation
| Genus | Species | District | Stratigraphic position | Abundance | Notes | Images |
|---|---|---|---|---|---|---|
| Allosaurus | Indeterminate | Guimarota | | MG 27804, an isolated maxilla belonging to a hatchling individual | The ontogenetically youngest and stratigraphically oldest Portuguese Allosaurus fossil | |
| Aviatyrannis | A. jurassica | Guimarota | | | | |
| Ceratosaurus | Indeterminate | Lisboa | | | | |
| Torvosaurus | T. sp. | | | Teeth | Teeth referrable to Torvosaurus. | |

=== Pterosaurs ===
Pterosaurs of the Alcobaça Formation
| Genus | Species | Location | Stratigraphic Position | Material | Notes | Images |
|---|---|---|---|---|---|---|
| aff. Rhamphorhynchus | Indeterminate | Guimarota | | Isolated Fragments | | |
| Pterodactyloidea | Indeterminate | Guimarota | | Teeth | | |

=== Turtles ===
Turtles of the Alcobaça Formation
| Genus | Species | Location | Stratigraphic position | Material | Notes | Images |
|---|---|---|---|---|---|---|
| Peltochelys | P. duchastelli | Guimarota | | | | |
| Platychelys | Indeterminate | Guimarota | | | | |
| Pleurosternidae | Indeterminate | Guimarota | | | | |

=== Lepidosauromorphs ===
Lepidosauromorphs of the Alcobaça Formation
| Genus | Species | Location | Stratigraphic position | Material | Notes | Images |
|---|---|---|---|---|---|---|
| Becklesius | B. hoffstetteri | Guimarota | | | Paramacellodid lizard | |
| Dorsetisaurus | D. purbeckensis | Guimarota | | | Anguimorph lizard | |
| Marmoretta | M. drescherae | Guimarota | | | Basal Lepidosauromorph | |
| Portugalophis | P. lignites | Guimarota | | | Stem-snake | |
| Saurillodon | S. proraformis | Guimarota | | | A lizard | |
| Saurillus | S. henkeli, cf. obtusus | Guimarota | | | A lizard | |
| cf. Opisthias | Indeterminate | Andrés, Pombal | | | A rhynchocephalian | |

=== Crocodyliformes ===
Crocodyliformes of the Alcobaça Formation
| Genus | Species | Location | Stratigraphic position | Material | Notes | Images |
|---|---|---|---|---|---|---|
| Goniopholis | G. baryglyphaeus | Guimarota | | | A goniopholidid | |
| Knoetschkesuchus | K. guimarotae | Guimarota | | | An atoposaurid | |
| Lisboasaurus | L. mitracostatus | Guimarota | | | | |
| Machimosaurus | M. hugii | Guimarota | | | A marine machimosaurid | |

=== Mammals ===
Mammals of the Alcobaça Formation
| Genus | Species | Location | Stratigraphic position | Material | Notes | Images |
|---|---|---|---|---|---|---|
| Bathmochoffatia | B. hapax | Guimarota | | | A paulchoffatiid multituberculate | |
| Bernardodon | B. sp, B. atlanticus | Porto Pinheiro | | | A pinheirodontid multituberculate | |
| Drescheratherium | D. acutum | Guimarota | | | A paurodontid dryolestidan | |
| Dryolestes | D. leirensis | Guimarota | | | A dryolestid dryolestidan | |
| Ecprepaulax | E. anomala | Porto Pinheiro | | | A pinheirodontid multituberculate | |
| Guimarotodon | G. leiriensis | Guimarota | | | A paulchoffatiid multituberculate | |
| Guimarotodus | G. inflatus | Guimarota | | | A dryolestid dryolestidan | |
| Haldanodon | H. exspectatus | Guimarota | | | A docodont | |
| Henkelodon | H. naias, H. sp | Guimarota | | | A paulchoffatiid multituberculate | |
| Henkelotherium | H. guimarotae | Guimarota | | | A dryolestidan | |
| Iberodon | I. quadrituberculatus | Porto Pinheiro | | | A pinheirodontid multituberculate | |
| Kielanodon | K. hopsoni | Guimarota | | | A paulchoffatiid multituberculate | |
| Krebsotherium | K. lusitanicum | Guimarota | | | A dryolestid dryolestidan | |
| Kuehneodon | K. guimarotensis, K. dietrichi, K. simpsoni, K. uniradiculatus, K. sp | Guimarota | | | A paulchoffatiid multituberculate | |
| Laolestes | L. andresi | Porto Pinheiro | | | A dryolestid dryolestidan | |
| Meketibolodon | M. robustus | Guimarota | | | A paulchoffatiid multituberculate | |
| Meketichoffatia | M. krausei, M. sp | Guimarota | | | A paulchoffatiid multituberculate | |
| Nanolestes | N. krusati | Porto Pinheiro | | | A cladotherian | |
| Nanolestes | N. drescherae | Guimarota | | | A cladotherian | |
| Paulchoffatia | P. delgadoi | Guimarota | | | A paulchoffatiid multituberculate | |
| Pinheirodon | P. sp, P. vastus, P. pygmaeus | Porto Pinheiro | | | A pinheirodontid multituberculate | |
| Plesiochoffatia | P. thoas, P. peperethos | Guimarota | | | A paulchoffatiid multituberculate | |
| Portopinheirodon | P. asymmetricus | Porto Pinheiro | | | A dryolestid dryolestidan | |
| Priacodon | Indeterminate | Porto Pinheiro | | | A triconodontid | |
| Proalbionbaatar | P. plagiocyrtus | Guimarota | | | A multituberculate of uncertain placement | |
| Pseudobolodon | P. dryas, P krebsi, P. oreas | Guimarota | | | A paulchoffatiid multituberculate | |
| Renatodon | R. amalthea | Guimarota | | | A paulchoffatiid multituberculate | |
| ? Tinodon | Indeterminate | Porto Pinheiro | | | A tinodontid symmetrodont | |
| Xenachoffatia | X. oinopion | Guimarota | | | A paulchoffatiid multituberculate | |
| Paulchoffatiidae | Indeterminate | Guimarota | | | 4 distinct genera with 7 species | |
| Pinheirodontidae | Indeterminate | Porto Pinheiro | | | | |

| Color key: Taxon / Reclassified taxon / Taxon falsely reported as present / Dubious taxon or junior synonym / Ichnotaxon / Ootaxon / Morphotaxon | Notes; Uncertain or tentative taxa are in small text; ~~crossed out~~ taxa are discredited. |

== Invertebrate Paleofauna ==
=== Ostracods ===
Ostracods of the Alcobaça Formation
| Genus | Species | Location | Stratigraphic Position | Material | Notes | Images |
|---|---|---|---|---|---|---|
| Cetacella | C. armata | | | | Cetacella is a typical component of Late Jurassic brackish water environments in Europe. Member of the Cypridacea | |
| Cetacella | C. inermis | | | | Cetacella is a typical component of Late Jurassic brackish water environments in Europe. Member of the Cypridacea | |
| Cetacella | C. striata | | | | Cetacella is a typical component of Late Jurassic brackish water environments in Europe. Member of the Cypridacea | |
| Theriosynoecum | T. wyomingense | | | | Member of the Cytheracea | |
| Bisulcocypris | B. pahasapensis | | | | Member of the Cytheracea | |
| Timiriasevia | T. guimarotensis | | | | Member of the Cytheracea | |
| Poisia | P. bicostata | | | | Member of the Cytheracea | |
| Poisia | P. clivosa | | | | Member of the Cytheracea | |
| Dicrorygima | D. reticulata | | | | Member of the Cytheracea | |
| Darwinula | D. leguminella | | | | Member of the Darwinulacea | |

=== Mollusca ===
==== Bivalves ====
Bivalves of the Alcobaça Formation
| Genus | Species | Location | Stratigraphic Position | Material | Notes | Images |
|---|---|---|---|---|---|---|
| Isognomon | I. rugosus | Guimarota | | Dozens of well preserved shells sometimes making up entire stratigraphic layers | This genus is regarded as an indicator for brachyhaline water conditions and it was likely buried in its natural habitat | |
| "Unio" | "U." cf. alcobacensis | Guimarota | | Dozens of well preserved shells with articulated valves | freshwater clam | |

==== Gastropods ====
Gastropods of the Alcobaça Formation
| Genus | Species | Location | Stratigraphic Position | Material | Notes | Images |
|---|---|---|---|---|---|---|
| Teinostoma | Indeterminate | Guimarota | | Shells | Boring traces of clionidid sponges on the shells of this taxon indicate a marine lifestyle | |
| Cryptaulax | Indeterminate | Guimarota | | Shells | | |
| Melampoides | M. jurassicus | Guimarota | | Shells | Boring traces of clionidid sponges on the shells of this taxon indicate a marine lifestyle, modern relatives like Melampus also venture onto land, which can also be expected from M. jurassicus | |

== See also ==
- List of dinosaur-bearing rock formations
- List of fossiliferous stratigraphic units in Portugal
