= Lisbon District =

District of Portugal

Lisbon Lisboa
- District
- Flag Coat of arms

- Location of Lisbon within continental Portugal
- Coordinates: 38°42′N 9°11′W
- Country: Portugal
- Region: Lisbon
- Historical province: Estremadura
- Number of municipalities: 16
- Number of parishes: 141
- Capital: Lisbon

Area
  - Total: 2,800 km^{2} (1,100 sq mi)

Population
  - Total: 2,135,992
  - Density: 760/km^{2} (2,000/sq mi)
- ISO 3166 code: PT-11
- No. of parliamentary representatives: 48

Lisbon (Portuguese: Lisboa) is a district located along the western coast of Portugal. The district capital is the city of Lisbon, which is also the national capital. From its creation in 1835 until 1926, it included the area of the current Setúbal District.

== Municipalities ==
The district is composed of 16 municipalities:

- Alenquer
- Amadora
- Arruda dos Vinhos
- Azambuja
- Cadaval
- Cascais
- Lisbon
- Loures
- Lourinhã
- Mafra
- Odivelas
- Oeiras
- Sintra
- Sobral de Monte Agraço
- Torres Vedras
- Vila Franca de Xira

== Summary of votes and seats won (1976–2022) ==
Summary of election results from Lisbon district, 1976–2022
Parties	%	S	%	S	%	S	%	S	%	S	%	S	%	S	%	S	%	S	%	S	%	S	%	S	%	S	%	S	%	S	%	S
Parties	1976		1979		1980		1983		1985		1987		1991		1995		1999		2002		2005		2009		2011		2015		2019		2022	
PS	38.3	25	25.8	15	28.1	17	35.8	21	19.8	12	21.2	12	29.7	16	44.3	24	42.7	23	38.7	20	44.1	23	36.4	19	27.5	14	33.5	18	36.7	20	40.8	21
PSD	16.4	10	In AD				21.8	13	25.6	15	45.8	28	45.3	25	29.0	15	27.3	14	35.7	18	23.7	12	25.1	13	34.1	18	In PàF		22.6	12	24.2	13
CDS-PP	13.2	8	In AD				11.7	7	8.1	4	3.7	2	4.0	2	9.4	5	8.5	4	8.5	4	8.2	4	11.0	5	13.8	7	In PàF		4.4	2	1.7	
PCP/APU/CDU	21.8	14	26.0	16	23.1	13	25.3	15	20.1	12	16.5	10	12.2	6	12.0	6	12.3	6	8.8	4	9.8	5	9.9	5	9.6	5	9.8	5	7.8	4	5.1	2
UDP	2.6	1	2.8	1	1.7	1																										
AD			40.0	24	41.6	25																										
PRD									21.3	13	6.9	4																				
PSN													2.7	1																		
BE																	4.9	2	4.7	2	8.8	4	10.8	5	5.7	3	10.9	5	9.7	5	4.7	2
PàF																											34.7	18				
PAN																											2.0	1	4.4	2	2.0	1
CHEGA																													2.0	1	7.8	4
IL																													2.5	1	7.9	4
LIVRE																													2.1	1	2.4	1
Total seats	58		56										50				49		48				47						48			
Source: Comissão Nacional de Eleições

== See also ==
- Villages in the district of Lisbon:
  - Abelheira
  - Gouveia
  - Varge Mondar
