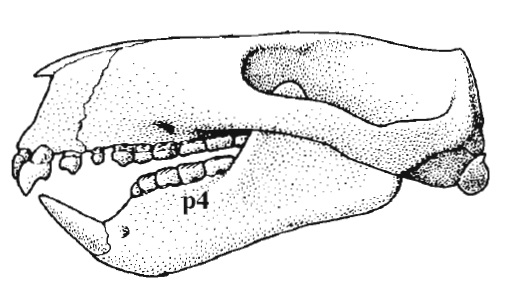
- Drawing of the skull of Paulchoffatia

Scientific classification
- Kingdom: Animalia
- Phylum: Chordata
- Class: Mammalia
- Order: †Multituberculata
- Suborder: †Plagiaulacida
- Family: †Paulchoffatiidae; Hahn, 1969

Genera
- Angrivarodon; Bathmochoffatia; Cimbriodon; Galveodon; Guimarotodon; Henkelodon; Kielanodon; Kuehneodon; Meketibolodon; Meketichoffatia; Paulchoffatia; Plesiochoffatia; Pseudobolodon; Sunnyodon; Xenachoffatia

= Paulchoffatiidae =

Paulchoffatiidae Temporal range: Kimmeridgian–Barremian

Extinct family of mammals

Paulchoffatiidae is a family of extinct mammals that lived predominantly during the Late Jurassic epoch, though a couple of genera are known from the Early Cretaceous. Fossils have been reported from Europe (Portugal, Spain, Germany, and England). Paulchoffatiids were members of the order Multituberculata. They were relatively early representatives and are within the informal suborder of "Plagiaulacida". The family was named by G. Hahn in 1969, and it honors the Portuguese geologist Léon Paul Choffat.

The most productive fossil site for Paulchoffatiids has been Guimarota, Portugal. Remains from this locality are generally diagnosed on the basis of lower or upper jaws. In only one instance, that of Kuehneodon, has it been possible to match the two up. Some of the lower jaws probably represent the same animals as some of the upper, so the diversity of Paulchoffatiids is very possibly exaggerated. As the site is now a flooded, disused coalmine, further excavations are highly unlikely. However, other locations may yet provide more clarity.

== Taxonomy ==
Two subfamilies of Paulchoffatiidae are recognised. One is known as Paulchoffatiinae. The other is known as Kuehneodontinae. The subfamily Paulchoffatiinae includes Paulchoffatia, Bathmochoffatia, Guimarotodon, Henkelodon, Kielanodon, Meketibolodon, Meketichoffatia, Plesiochoffatia, Pseudobolodon, Galveodon, Sunnyodon, and Xenachoffatia. The subfamily Kuehneodontinae, meanwhile, is a taxon restricted to one genus, Kuehneodon, with seven species. Rugosodon from the Middle Jurassic of China, known from a mostly complete skeleton, was formerly referred to the family, but was later considered an indeterminate member of the Paulchoffatiid-line.

== Palaeobiology ==
Tooth occlusion in paulchoffatiids was inexact and imprecise compared to in other multituberculates, as indicated by dental microwear. Paulchoffatiid mastication occurred in two phases: a puncture-crushing cycle and a grinding cycle.
