= Guimarotodon =

Guimarotodon Temporal range: Late Jurassic

Scientific classification
- Kingdom: Animalia
- Phylum: Chordata
- Class: Mammalia
- Order: †Multituberculata
- Family: †Paulchoffatiidae
- Genus: †Guimarotodon; G. Hahn, 1969

Species
- G. leiriensis

Extinct family of mammals

Guimarotodon is an extinct mammal of the Upper Jurassic. It was a relatively early member of the also extinct order of Multituberculata. It made its living nibbling plants as great big, and small, dinosaurs roamed the world. (For the technically minded, suborder Plagiaulacida, family Paulchoffatiidae.)

Guimarotodon ("Guimarota tooth") Hahn G, 1969. "Guimarotodon Hahn 1969 exhibits a more slender Corpus mandibulae than either Paulchoffatia or Meketibolodon. The most conspicuous character of this genus is the morphology of the P3-4 and the M1.". The Corpus mandibulae is the part of the jaw below the tooth row. P3-4 are upper premolars, whilst M1 is an upper molar tooth.

"The incisor is relatively little curved and its root is of similar length as that of Meketibolodon and extends to underneath the posterior premolars." (Both quotations from Hahn & Hahn 2000, p. 105-106).

== Guimarotodon leiriensis ==
Guimarotodon leiriensis is found in Kimmeridgian (Upper Jurassic) of Guimarota, Portugal. Classification is based on three lower jaws. The species name refers to the local town of Leiria.
