= Gouveia =

Gouveia may refer to:

== People ==
- Gouveia (surname)

== Places ==
=== Brazil ===
- Gouveia, Minas Gerais, a municipality in the State of Minas Gerais
- Delmiro Gouveia, a municipality in the State of Alagoas

=== Cape Verde ===
- Porto Gouveia, a village situated on Santiago Island

=== Portugal ===
- Gouveia, Portugal, a municipality in the district of Guarda
- Gouveia (Sintra), a village located in the municipality of Sintra

== Other ==
- Marquess of Gouveia, Portuguese title of nobility
