= Angrivarodon =

Angrivarodon Temporal range: Barremian–Aptian

Scientific classification
- Kingdom: Animalia
- Phylum: Chordata
- Class: Mammalia
- Order: †Multituberculata
- Genus: †Angrivarodon
- Species: †A. goresi

Binomial name
- †Angrivarodon goresi Martin et al., 2026

Extinct genus of mammals

Angrivarodon is an extinct genus of multituberculate that lived in Europe during the Early Cretaceous epoch.

== Description ==
Angrivarodon differs from all other paulchoffatiid multituberculates in its cusp formula of 4B:6L.
