= Radiation of mesozoic mammals =

In the Mesozoic era, an abundance of mammals appeared in the fossil record, mostly multituberculates diversifying and continuing right after the extinction of all non avian dinosaurs alongside diet diversification. The Jurassic is the period to experience the major radiation of mammals from middle to late Jurassic being greeted with an abundance of insectivorous mammals including Morganucodon.

For most of the history of mammals, all of them were small at one time. Despite the size differences, mammal evolution continued with early appearances of marsupials and placentals. Even after the K-T event that happened 65 million years ago, mammals did not immediately diversify but instead took more time later on until they truly filled the niches left by non avian dinosaurs in the Miocene.
