= Meketichoffatia =

Meketichoffatia Temporal range: Late Jurassic

Scientific classification
- Kingdom: Animalia
- Phylum: Chordata
- Class: Mammalia
- Order: †Multituberculata
- Family: †Paulchoffatiidae
- Genus: †Meketichoffatia
- Species: †M. krausei

Binomial name
- †Meketichoffatia krausei G. Hahn, 1993

Species of mammal

Meketichoffatia was a small mammal from the Upper Jurassic of Portugal. It was a relatively early member of the extinct order Multituberculata. It lived at the same time as dinosaurs such as Allosaurus. It's within the suborder "Plagiaulacida" and family Paulchoffatiidae.

The genus Meketichoffatia was named by Hahn G. in 1993 based on a single species. Fossil remains of the species Meketichoffatia krausei consisting of two upper jaws were found in Kimmeridgian (Upper Jurassic)-age Camadas de Guimarota of Guimarota, Portugal.
