= Meketibolodon =

Meketibolodon Temporal range: Late Jurassic

Scientific classification
- Kingdom: Animalia
- Phylum: Chordata
- Class: Mammalia
- Order: †Multituberculata
- Family: †Paulchoffatiidae
- Genus: †Meketibolodon; G. Hahn, 1993

Species
- M. robustus

Extinct family of mammals

Meketibolodon is a genus of extinct mammal from the Kimmeridgian (Upper Jurassic) Camadas de Guimarota of Guimarota, Portugal. It was a relatively early member of the also extinct order Multituberculata, suborder Plagiaulacida, family Paulchoffatiidae. The genus was named by Hahn G. in 1993 based on nine specimens of lower jaw. The type species is Pseudobolodon robustus Hahn 1978.

"Meketibolodon (Hahn 1993) is distinguished from the other genera [of Paulchoffatiidae] by two characters: the tooth row is significantly convexly curved upwards, and the corpus mandibulae has angled margins ventrally (Hahn and Hahn 1998b). The incisor is more strongly curved than it is the case in Paulchoffatia, and its root is longer. The corpus mandibulae is similarly massive to that in Paulchoffatia" (Hahn and Hahn 2000, p. 105). The corpus mandibulae is the part of the lower jaw beneath the tooth row, and mekéti (μηκέτι) is Greek for 'no longer'.
