= Mesozoic =

Second era of the Phanerozoic Eon

Mesozoic Era
- 251.902 ± 0.024 – 66.0 Ma

Chronology
An approximate timescale of key Mesozoic events Vertical axis scale: Millions of years ago

Etymology
- Name formality: Formal
- Nickname(s): Age of Reptiles, Age of Dinosaurs, Age of Conifers

Usage information
- Celestial body: Earth
- Regional usage: Global (ICS)
- Time scale(s) used: ICS Time Scale

Definition
- Chronological unit: Era
- Stratigraphic unit: Erathem
- Time span formality: Formal
- Lower boundary definition: First appearance of the Conodont Hindeodus parvus.
- Lower boundary GSSP: Meishan, Zhejiang, China; 31.0798°N 119.7058°E
- Lower GSSP ratified: 2001
- Upper boundary definition: Iridium enriched layer associated with a major meteorite impact and subsequent K-Pg extinction event.
- Upper boundary GSSP: El Kef Section, El Kef, Tunisia; 36.1537°N 8.6486°E
- Upper GSSP ratified: 1991

The Mesozoic Era (Note: There are several ways of pronouncing Mesozoic, including IPA: /ˌmɛzəˈzoʊ.ɪk, -zoʊ-, ˌmɛs-, ˌmiːz-, ˌmiː.s-/ MEZ-ə-ZOH-ik, MEZ-oh-, MESS-, MEE-z-, MEE-s-.) is an era of Earth's geological history, lasting from about 252 to 66 million years ago (Ma), comprising the Triassic, Jurassic and Cretaceous Periods. It is characterized by the dominance of archosaurian reptiles such as the dinosaurs, and of gymnosperms such as cycads, ginkgoaceae and araucarian conifers; a hot greenhouse climate; and the tectonic break-up of Pangaea. The Mesozoic is the middle of the three eras since complex life evolved: the Paleozoic, the Mesozoic, and the Cenozoic.

The Mesozoic is commonly known as the Age of the Dinosaurs because the terrestrial animals that dominated the majority of it were dinosaurs. This era began in the wake of the Permian–Triassic extinction event, the largest mass extinction in Earth's history, and ended with the Cretaceous–Paleogene extinction event, another mass extinction whose victims included the non-avian dinosaurs, pterosaurs, mosasaurs, and plesiosaurs. The Mesozoic was a time of significant tectonic, climatic, and evolutionary activity. The supercontinent Pangaea began to break apart into separate landmasses. The climate of the Mesozoic was varied, alternating between warming and cooling periods. Overall, however, the Earth was hotter than it is today.

Dinosaurs first appeared in the Mid-Triassic, and became the dominant terrestrial vertebrates in the Late Triassic or Early Jurassic, occupying this position for about 150 or 135 Ma until their demise at the end of the Cretaceous. Archaic birds appeared in the Jurassic, having evolved from a branch of theropod dinosaurs, then true toothless birds appeared in the Cretaceous. The first mammals also appeared during the Mesozoic, but would remain small—less than 15 kg (33 lb)—until the Cenozoic. Flowering plants appeared in the Early Cretaceous and would rapidly diversify through the end of the era, replacing conifers and other gymnosperms (sensu lato), such as ginkgoales, cycads and bennettitales as the dominant group of plants.

== Naming ==
The phrase "Age of Reptiles" was introduced by the 19th century paleontologist Gideon Mantell who viewed it as dominated by diapsids such as Iguanodon, Megalosaurus, Plesiosaurus, and Pterodactylus.

The current name was proposed in 1840 by the British geologist John Phillips (1800–1874). "Mesozoic" literally means 'middle life', deriving from the Greek prefix meso- (μεσο- 'between') and zōon (ζῷον 'animal, living being'). In this way, the Mesozoic is comparable to the Cenozoic (lit. 'new life') and Paleozoic ('old life') eras as well as the Proterozoic ('earlier life') Eon.

The Mesozoic Era was originally described as the "secondary" era, following the "primary" (Paleozoic), and preceding the Tertiary.

== Geologic periods ==
Following the Paleozoic, the Mesozoic extended roughly 186 million years, from 252 to 66 Ma when the Cenozoic Era began. This time frame is separated into three geologic periods. From oldest to youngest:

- Triassic Period (251.902 to 201.4 Ma)
- Jurassic Period (201.4 to 143.1 Ma)
- Cretaceous Period (143.1 to 66 Ma)

The lower boundary of the Mesozoic is set by the Permian–Triassic extinction event, during which it has been estimated that up to 90–96% of marine species became extinct although those approximations have been brought into question with some paleontologists estimating the actual numbers as low as 81%. It is also known as the "Great Dying" because it is considered the largest mass extinction in the Earth's history. The upper boundary of the Mesozoic is set at the Cretaceous–Paleogene extinction event (or K–Pg extinction event), which may have been caused by an asteroid impactor that created Chicxulub Crater on the Yucatán Peninsula. Towards the Late Cretaceous, large volcanic eruptions are also believed to have contributed to the Cretaceous–Paleogene extinction event. Approximately 50% of all genera became extinct, including all of the non-avian dinosaurs.

=== Triassic ===
The Triassic lasted from 251.902 to 201.4 Ma, preceding the Jurassic Period. The period is bracketed between the Permian–Triassic extinction event and the Triassic–Jurassic extinction event, two of the "big five", and it is divided into three major epochs: Early, Middle, and Late Triassic.

The Early Triassic (251.902 to 247 Ma) was dominated by deserts in the interior of the Pangaea supercontinent. The Earth had just witnessed a massive die-off in which 95% of all life became extinct, and the most common vertebrate life on land were Lystrosaurus, labyrinthodonts, and Euparkeria along with many other creatures that managed to survive the Permian extinction. Temnospondyls reached peak diversity during the early Triassic.

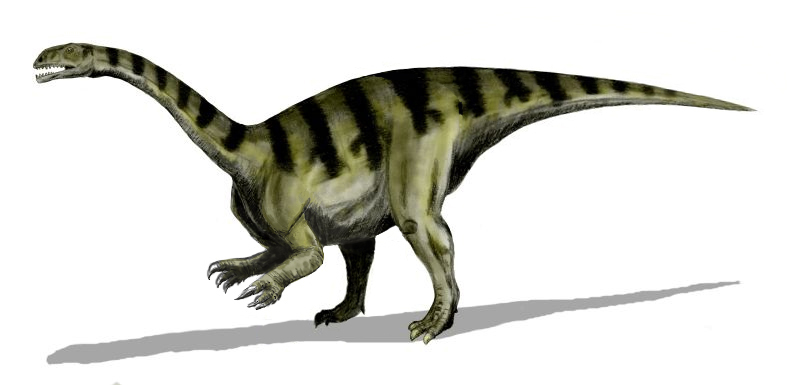
Plateosaurus (a prosauropod)

The Middle Triassic (247 to 237 Ma) featured the beginnings of the breakup of Pangaea and the opening of the Tethys Ocean. Ecosystems had recovered from the Permian extinction. Algae, sponge, corals, and crustaceans all had recovered, and new aquatic reptiles evolved, such as ichthyosaurs and nothosaurs. On land, pine forests flourished, as did groups of insects such as mosquitoes and fruit flies. Reptiles began to get bigger and bigger, and the first crocodilians and dinosaurs evolved, which sparked competition with the large amphibians that had previously ruled the freshwater world, respectively mammal-like reptiles on land.

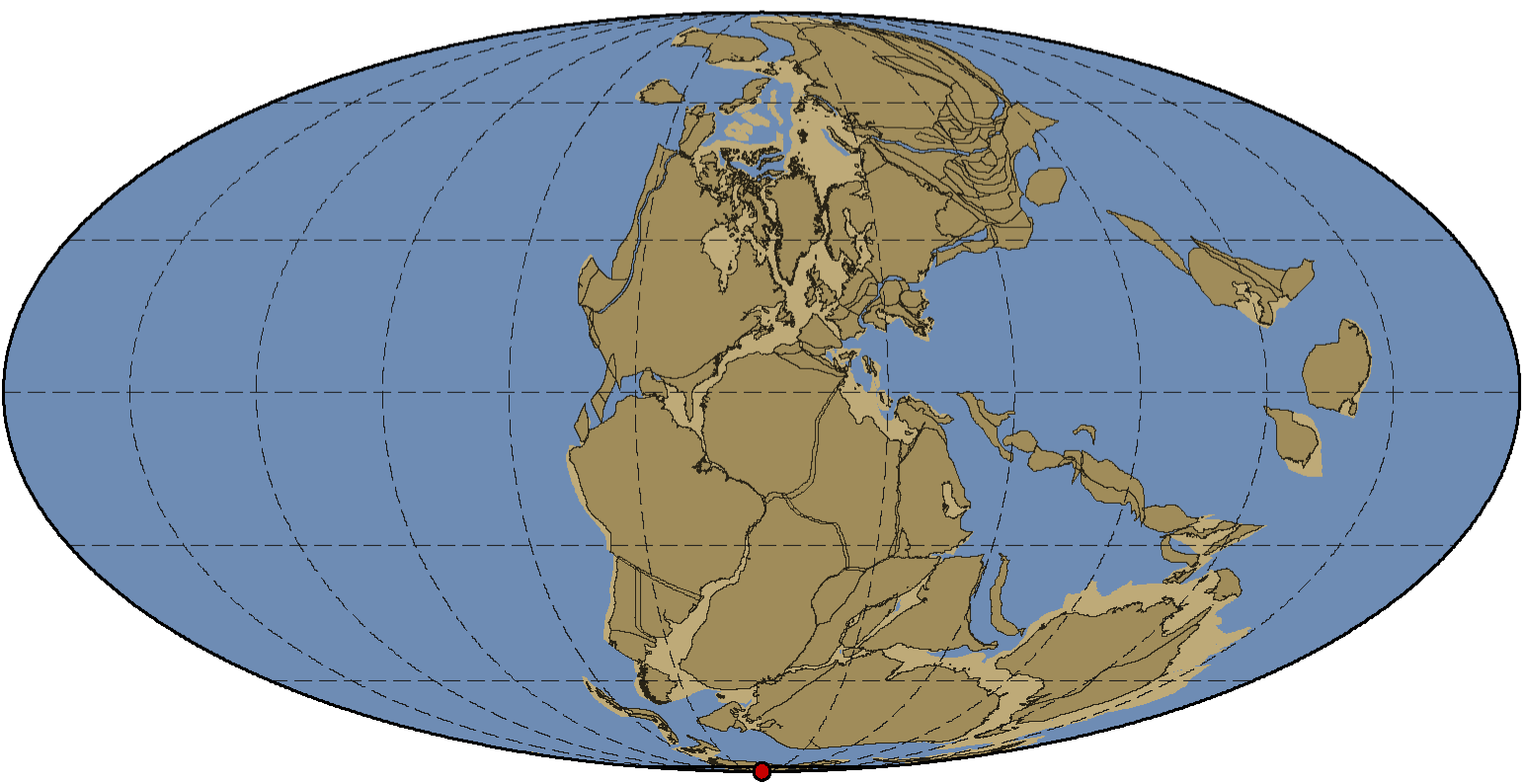
Paleomap approximation of the Earth in the Early Triassic Period

Following the bloom of the Middle Triassic, the Late Triassic (247 to 237 Ma) featured frequent heat spells and moderate precipitation (10–20 inches per year). The recent warming led to a boom of dinosaurian evolution on land as the continents began to separate from each other (Nyasasaurus from 243 to 210 Ma, approximately 235–30 Ma, some of them separated into Sauropodomorphs, Theropods and Herrerasaurids), as well as the first pterosaurs. During the Late Triassic, some advanced cynodonts gave rise to the first Mammaliaformes. All this climatic change, however, resulted in a large die-out known as the Triassic–Jurassic extinction event, in which many archosaurs (excluding pterosaurs, dinosaurs and crocodylomorphs), most synapsids, and almost all large amphibians became extinct, as well as 34% of marine life, in the Earth's fourth mass extinction event. The cause is debatable; flood basalt eruptions at the Central Atlantic magmatic province is cited as one possible cause.

=== Jurassic ===
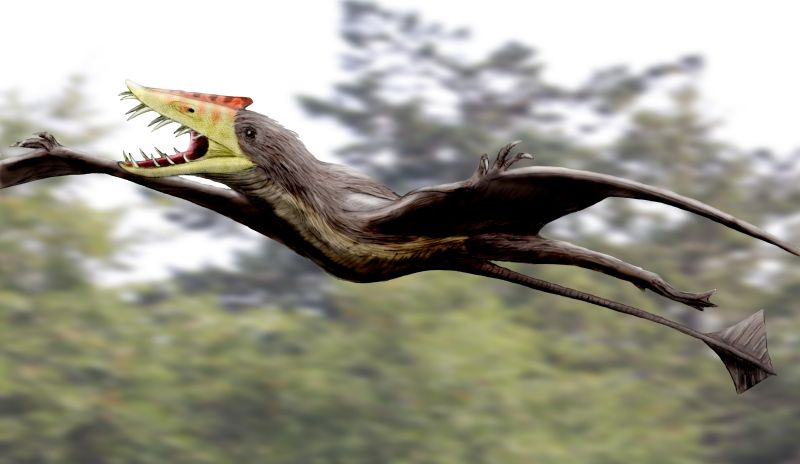
Sericipterus

The Jurassic lasted from 201.4 to 143.1 Ma and is divided into three major epochs: The Early Jurassic, the Middle Jurassic, and the Late Jurassic.

During the Early Jurassic (201.4 to 174.7 Ma) the climate was tropical and much more humid than the Triassic, as a result of the large seas appearing between the land masses. In the oceans, plesiosaurs, ichthyosaurs and ammonites were abundant. On land, dinosaurs and other archosaurs staked their claim as the dominant race, with theropods such as Dilophosaurus at the top of the food chain. The first true crocodiles evolved, pushing the large amphibians to near extinction. All-in-all, archosaurs rose to rule the world. Meanwhile, an abundance of mammaliaforms appeared in the Jurassic with the first true mammals evolving, remaining relatively small, but spreading widely; the Jurassic Castorocauda, for example, had adaptations for swimming, digging and catching fish. Fruitafossor, from the late Jurassic Period about 150 Ma, was about the size of a chipmunk, and its teeth, forelimbs and back suggest that it dug open the nests of social insects (probably termites, as ants had not yet appeared); Volaticotherium was able to glide for short distances, such as modern flying squirrels. The first multituberculates such as Rugosodon evolved.

During the Middle Jurassic (174.7 to 161.5 Ma) dinosaurs flourished as huge herds of sauropods, such as Brachiosaurus and Diplodocus, filled the fern prairies, chased by many new predators such as Allosaurus. Conifer forests made up a large portion of the forests. In the oceans, plesiosaurs were quite common, and ichthyosaurs flourished. This epoch was the peak of the reptiles.

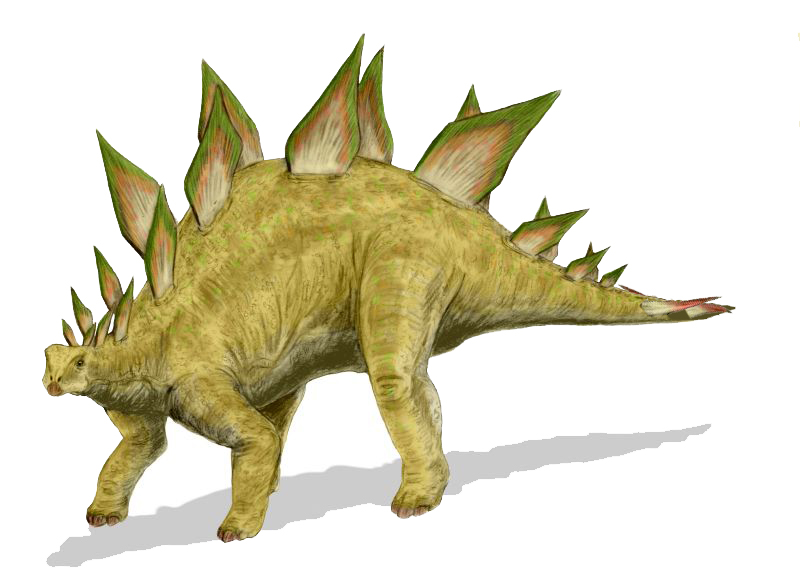
Stegosaurus

During the Late Jurassic (161.5 to 143.1 Ma) the first avialans, such as Archaeopteryx, evolved from small coelurosaurian dinosaurs. The increase in sea levels opened up the Atlantic seaway, which has grown continually larger until today. The further separation of the continents gave opportunity for the diversification of new dinosaurs.

=== Cretaceous ===
The Cretaceous is the longest period of the Mesozoic, but has only two epochs: Early and Late Cretaceous.

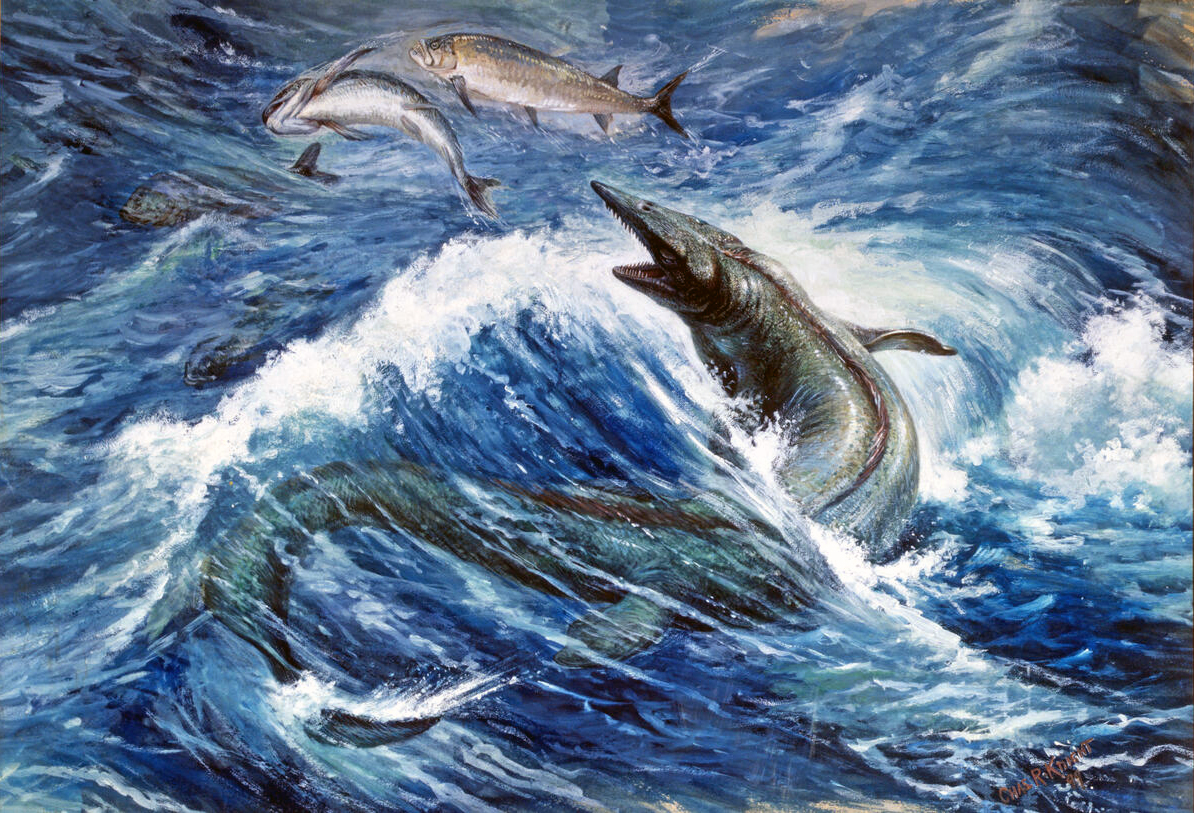
Tylosaurus (a mosasaur) hunting Xiphactinus

The Early Cretaceous (143.1 to 100.5 Ma) saw the expansion of seaways and a decline in diversity of sauropods, stegosaurs, and other high-browsing groups. Sauropods became particularly scarce in North America, setting the stage for the Late Cretaceous Sauropod hiatus there. Some island-hopping dinosaurs, such as Eustreptospondylus, evolved to cope with the coastal shallows and small islands of ancient Europe. Other dinosaurs rose up to fill the empty space that the Jurassic-Cretaceous extinction left behind, such as Carcharodontosaurus and Spinosaurus. Seasons came back into effect and the poles got seasonally colder, but some dinosaurs still inhabited the polar forests year round, such as Leaellynasaura and Muttaburrasaurus. The poles were too cold for crocodiles, and became the last stronghold for large amphibians such as Koolasuchus. Pterosaurs got larger as genera such as Tapejara and Ornithocheirus evolved. Mammals continued to expand their range: eutriconodonts produced fairly large, wolverine-like predators such as Repenomamus and Gobiconodon, early therians began to expand into metatherians and eutherians, and cimolodont multituberculates went on to become common in the fossil record.

The Late Cretaceous (100.5 to 66 Ma) featured a cooling trend that would continue in the Cenozoic Era. Eventually, tropics were restricted to the equator and areas beyond the tropic lines experienced extreme seasonal changes in weather. Dinosaurs still thrived, as new taxa such as Tyrannosaurus, Ankylosaurus, Triceratops and hadrosaurs dominated the food web. In the oceans, mosasaurs ruled, filling the role of the ichthyosaurs, which, after declining, had disappeared in the Cenomanian-Turonian boundary event. Though pliosaurs had gone extinct in the same event, long-necked plesiosaurs such as Elasmosaurus continued to thrive. Flowering plants, possibly appearing as far back as the Triassic, became truly dominant for the first time. Pterosaurs in the Late Cretaceous declined for poorly understood reasons, though this might be due to tendencies of the fossil record, as their diversity seems to be much higher than previously thought. Birds became increasingly common and diversified into a variety of enantiornithe and ornithurine forms. Though mostly small, marine hesperornithes became relatively large and flightless, adapted to life in the open sea. Metatherians and primitive eutherian also became common and even produced large and specialised genera such as Didelphodon and Schowalteria. Still, the dominant mammals were multituberculates, cimolodonts in the north and gondwanatheres in the south. At the end of the Cretaceous, the Deccan Traps and other volcanic eruptions were poisoning the atmosphere. As this continued, it is thought that a large meteor smashed into Earth 66 million years ago, creating the Chicxulub Crater in an event known as the K-Pg Extinction (formerly K-T), the fifth and most recent mass extinction event, in which 75% of life became extinct, including all non-avian dinosaurs.

== Paleogeography and tectonics ==
Compared to the vigorous convergent plate mountain-building of the late Paleozoic, Mesozoic tectonic deformation was comparatively mild. The sole major Mesozoic orogeny occurred in what is now the Arctic, creating the Innuitian orogeny, the Brooks Range, the Verkhoyansk and Cherskiy Ranges in Siberia, and the Khingan Mountains in Manchuria.

This orogeny was related to the opening of the Arctic Ocean and suturing of the North China and Siberian cratons to Asia. In contrast, the era featured the dramatic rifting of the supercontinent Pangaea, which gradually split into a northern continent, Laurasia, and a southern continent, Gondwana. This created the passive continental margin that characterizes most of the Atlantic coastline (such as along the U.S. East Coast) today.

By the end of the era, the continents had rifted into nearly their present forms, though not their present positions. Laurasia became North America and Eurasia, while Gondwana split into South America, Africa, Australia, Antarctica and the Indian subcontinent, which collided with the Asian plate during the Cenozoic, giving rise to the Himalayas.

== Climate ==
The Triassic was generally dry, a trend that began in the late Carboniferous, and highly seasonal, especially in the interior of Pangaea. Low sea levels may have also exacerbated temperature extremes. With its high specific heat capacity, water acts as a temperature-stabilizing heat reservoir, and land areas near large bodies of water—especially oceans—experience less variation in temperature. Because much of Pangaea's land was distant from its shores, temperatures fluctuated greatly, and the interior probably included expansive deserts. Abundant red beds and evaporites such as halite support these conclusions, but some evidence suggests the generally dry climate of the Triassic was punctuated by episodes of increased rainfall. The most important humid episodes were the Carnian Pluvial Event and one in the Rhaetian, a few million years before the Triassic–Jurassic extinction event.

Sea levels began to rise during the Jurassic, probably caused by an increase in seafloor spreading. The formation of new crust beneath the surface displaced ocean waters by as much as 200 m (656 ft) above today's sea level, flooding coastal areas. Furthermore, Pangaea began to rift into smaller divisions, creating new shoreline around the Tethys Ocean. Temperatures continued to increase, then began to stabilize. Humidity also increased with the proximity of water, and deserts retreated.

The climate of the Cretaceous is less certain and more widely disputed. Probably, higher levels of carbon dioxide in the atmosphere are thought to have almost eliminated the north–south temperature gradient: temperatures were about the same across the planet, and about 10°C higher than today. The circulation of oxygen to the deep ocean may also have been disrupted, preventing the decomposition of large volumes of organic matter, which was eventually deposited as "black shale".

Different studies have come to different conclusions about the amount of oxygen in the atmosphere during different parts of the Mesozoic, with some concluding oxygen levels were lower than the current level (about 21%) throughout the Mesozoic, some concluding they were lower in the Triassic and part of the Jurassic but higher in the Cretaceous, and some concluding they were higher throughout most or all of the Triassic, Jurassic and Cretaceous.

== Life ==
=== Flora ===
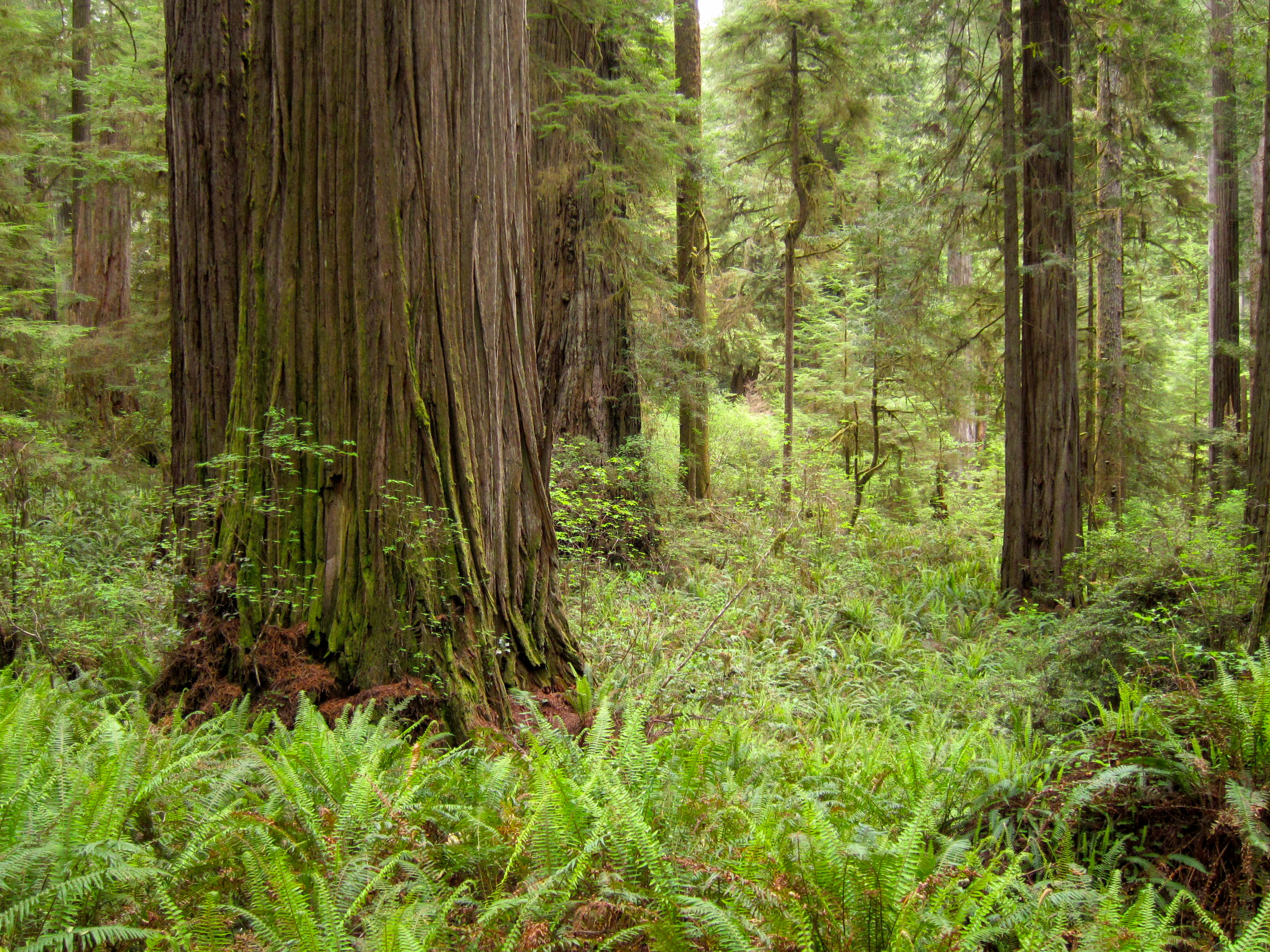
Conifers were the dominant terrestrial plants for most of the Mesozoic, with grasses becoming widespread in the Late Cretaceous. Flowering plants appeared late in the era but did not become widespread until the Cenozoic.

The dominant land plant species of the time were gymnosperms, which are vascular, cone-bearing, non-flowering plants such as conifers that produce seeds without a coating. This contrasts with the Earth's current flora, in which the dominant land plants in terms of number of species are angiosperms. The earliest members of the genus Ginkgo first appeared during the Middle Jurassic. This genus is represented today by a single species, Ginkgo biloba. Modern conifer groups began to radiate during the Jurassic. Bennettitales, an extinct group of gymnosperms with foliage superficially resembling that of cycads gained a global distribution during the Late Triassic, and represented one of the most common groups of Mesozoic seed plants.

Flowering plants radiated during the Early Cretaceous, first in the tropics, but the even temperature gradient allowed them to spread toward the poles throughout the period. By the end of the Cretaceous, angiosperms dominated tree floras in many areas, although some evidence suggests that biomass was still dominated by cycads and ferns until after the Cretaceous–Paleogene extinction. Some plant species had distributions that were markedly different from succeeding periods; for example, the Schizeales, a fern order, were skewed to the Northern Hemisphere in the Mesozoic, but are now better represented in the Southern Hemisphere.

=== Fauna ===
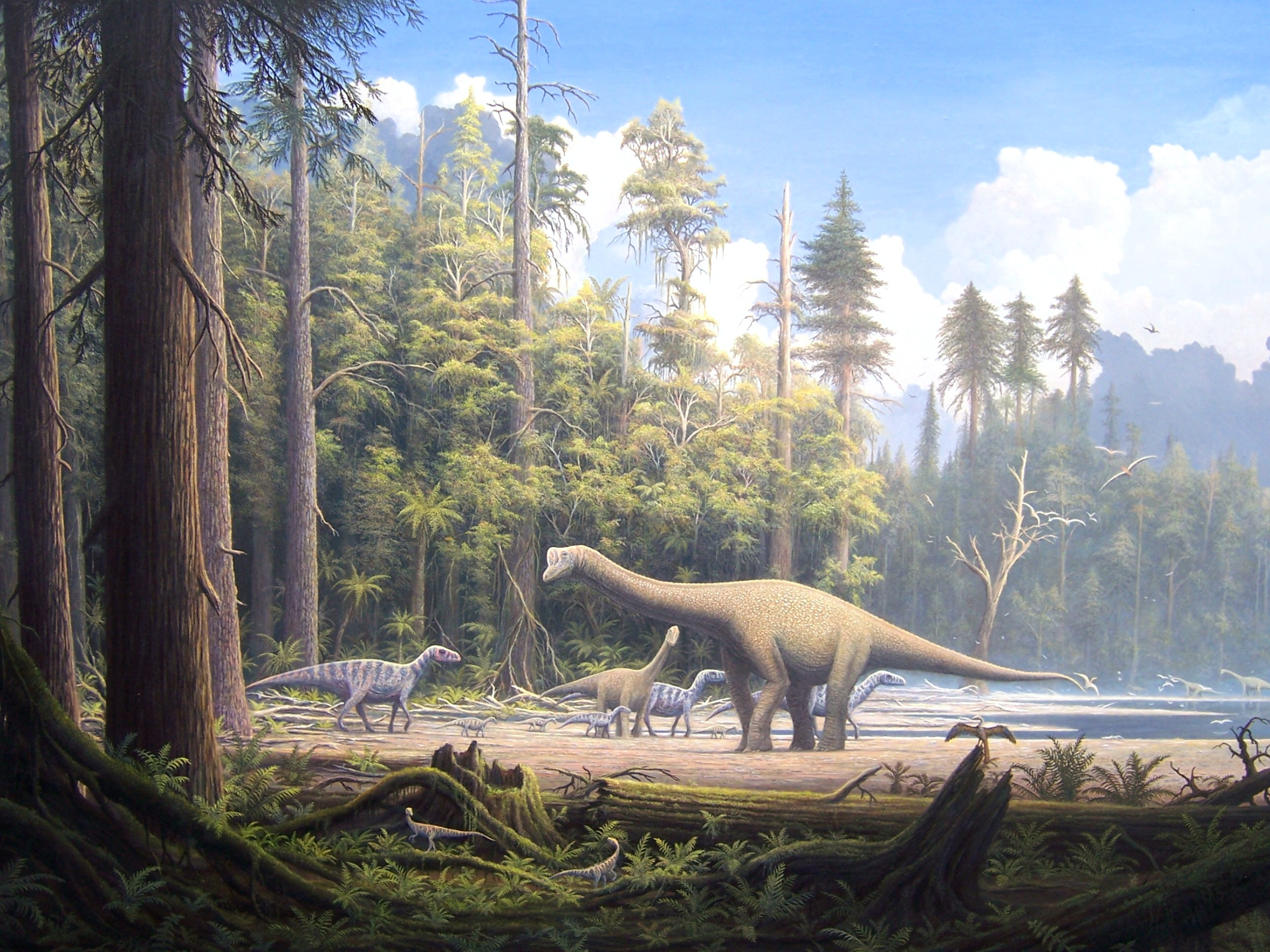
Dinosaurs were the dominant terrestrial vertebrates throughout much of the Mesozoic.

The extinction of nearly all animal species at the end of the Permian Period allowed for the radiation of many new lifeforms. In particular, the extinction of the large herbivorous pareiasaurs and carnivorous gorgonopsians left those ecological niches empty. Some were filled by the surviving cynodonts and dicynodonts, the latter of which subsequently became extinct.

Recent research indicates that it took much longer for the reestablishment of complex ecosystems with high biodiversity, complex food webs, and specialized animals in a variety of niches, beginning in the Middle Triassic 4 million to 6 million years after the extinction, and not fully proliferated until 30 million years after the extinction. During the Triassic, terrestrial herbivores avoided competition through significant niche partitioning by generally occupying highly distinct guilds. Animal life was then dominated by various archosaurs: dinosaurs, pterosaurs, and aquatic reptiles such as ichthyosaurs, plesiosaurs, and mosasaurs.

The climatic changes of the Late Jurassic and Cretaceous favored further adaptive radiation. The Jurassic was the height of archosaur diversity, and the first birds and eutherian mammals also appeared. Some have argued that insects diversified in symbiosis with angiosperms, because insect anatomy, especially the mouth parts, seems particularly well-suited for flowering plants. However, all major insect mouth parts preceded angiosperms, and insect diversification actually slowed when they arrived, so their anatomy originally must have been suited for some other purpose.

=== Microbiota ===
At the dawn of the Mesozoic, ocean plankton communities transitioned from ones dominated by green archaeplastidans to ones dominated by endosymbiotic algae with red-algal-derived plastids. This transition is speculated to have been caused by an increasing paucity of many trace metals in the Mesozoic ocean.

== See also ==
- Paleozoic Era
- Cenozoic Era
- Phanerozoic Eon
