= José Eduardo de Melo Gouveia =

Portuguese politician (1815–1893)

José de Melo Gouveia
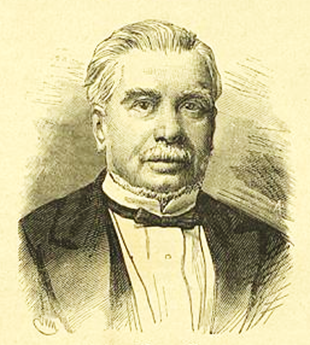

Personal details
- Born: José Eduardo de Melo Gouveia; 12 December 1815 Santa Justa, Coimbra, Coimbra District, Kingdom of Portugal
- Died: 15 December 1893 (aged 78) Lisbon, Kingdom of Portugal
- Occupation: Politician; Civil servant

José de Melo Gouveia (12 December 1815 – 15 December 1893) was a Portuguese statesman and Portugal's Minister of the Navy and Overseas.

== Biography ==
=== Early life ===
José Eduardo de Melo Gouveia was born in Santa Justa, Coimbra, Coimbra District, Kingdom of Portugal on 12 December 1815. His surname, Gouveia, traces back to Portuguese explorer Pedro Álvares de Gouveia Cabral.

He began his administrative career in 1845 as Chief Officer of the Civil Government of Coimbra and later held roles in Vila Real and the National Forests. Appointed Civil Governor of multiple districts, he declined the post in the District of Porto in 1870 to become Minister of the Navy and Overseas.

=== Political career ===
Under the reign of Luís I of Portugal, José de Melo Gouveia was appointed Minister of the Navy and Overseas from 29 October 1870 to 13 September 1871, during the 33rd Constitutional government. This title was historically used to refer to the government official responsible for naval affairs and colonial administration during the period of the Portuguese Empire.

He served as Minister and Secretary of state for Ecclesiastical Affairs and Justice from 30 January to 1 March 1871.

Gouveia assumed the position of minister at the Department of the Navy and Overseas in Lisbon in 1877, succeeding João de Andrade Corvo.

== Death ==
José de Melo Gouveia died on 15 December 1893 in Lisbon, Portugal.

== Gallery ==
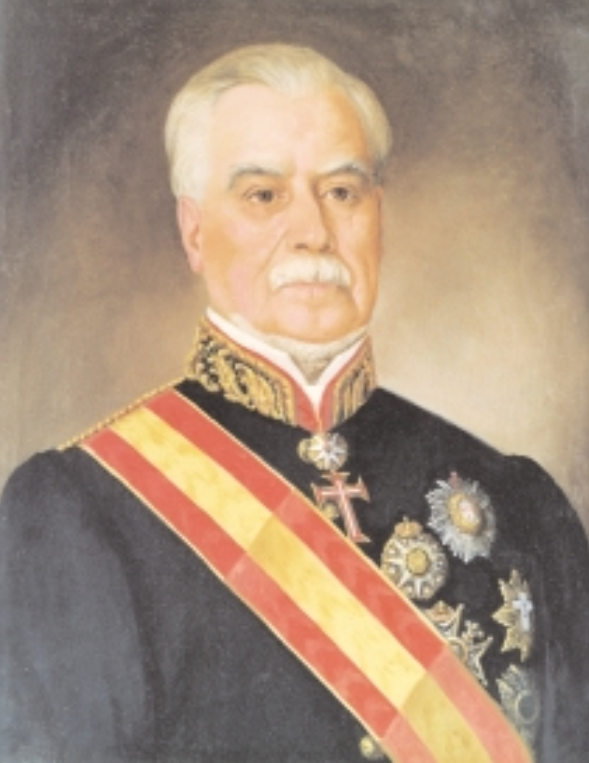
José Eduardo de Melo Gouveia (1815–1893)

== See also ==
- Gouveia (surname)
