= Gouveia (surname) =

Gouveia is a Portuguese surname. Notable people with the surname include:

- André de Gouveia (1497–1548), Portuguese humanist and pedagogue
- Pedro Álvares de Gouveia Cabral (1467–1520), Portuguese explorer, first European to Brazil
- José Eduardo de Melo Gouveia (1815–1893), Portuguese politician
- Antônio Gouveia (known as Carlão) (b. 1965), Brazilian volleyball player
- François Patrick Nogueira Gouveia (b. 1996), Brazilian spree murderer
- Inácio Henrique de Gouveia, Brazilian military leader
- Kurt Gouveia (b. 1964), American football linebacker
- Lata Gouveia (b. 1975), Blues singer
- Patrícia Gouveia (b. 1987), Portuguese footballer
- Ricardo Gouveia, real name of Rigo 23 (b. 1966), Portuguese muralist and painter and political artist
- Tami Gouveia, Massachusetts politician
- Tala Gouveia (b. 1988), British actress
- Teodósio de Gouveia (1889–1962), Portuguese Cardinal of the Roman Catholic Church
- Teresa Patrício de Gouveia (b. 1946), Portuguese politician
- Tiago Gouveia (b. 2001), Portuguese footballer
- Wilson Gouveia (b. 1978), Brazilian mixed martial arts participant
- Mario Vitor Gouveia Cau (known as Mario Cau) (b. 1984), Brazilian graphic novelist and illustrator

== See also ==
- Gouveia Municipality, Portugal, Portuguese city
- Gouveia (disambiguation) for other uses
