= Fontanelas =

Town in Portugal

Coordinates: 38°51′N 9°26′W

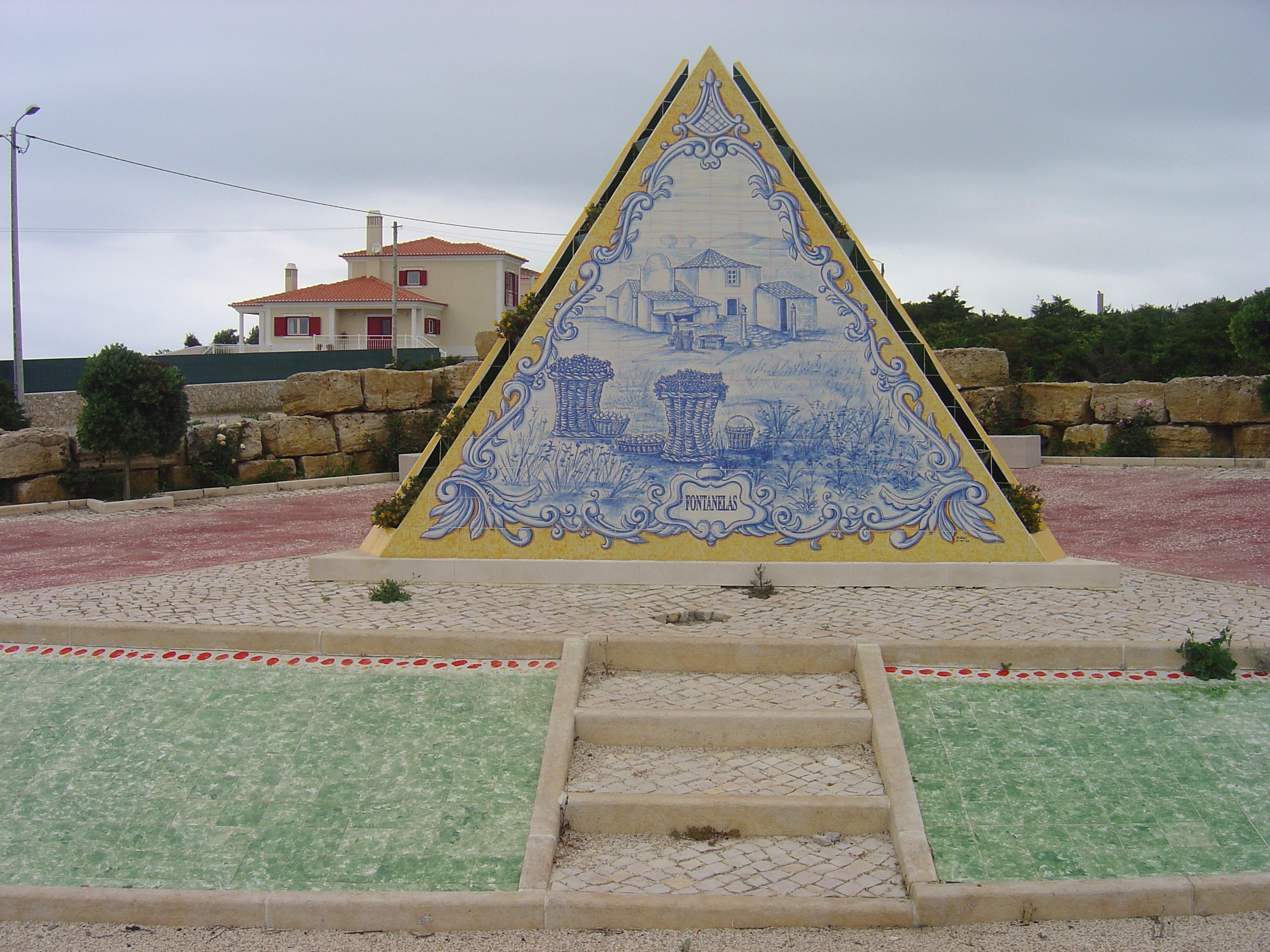
The pyramid at the entrance of Fontanelas, with typical Portuguese azulejos.

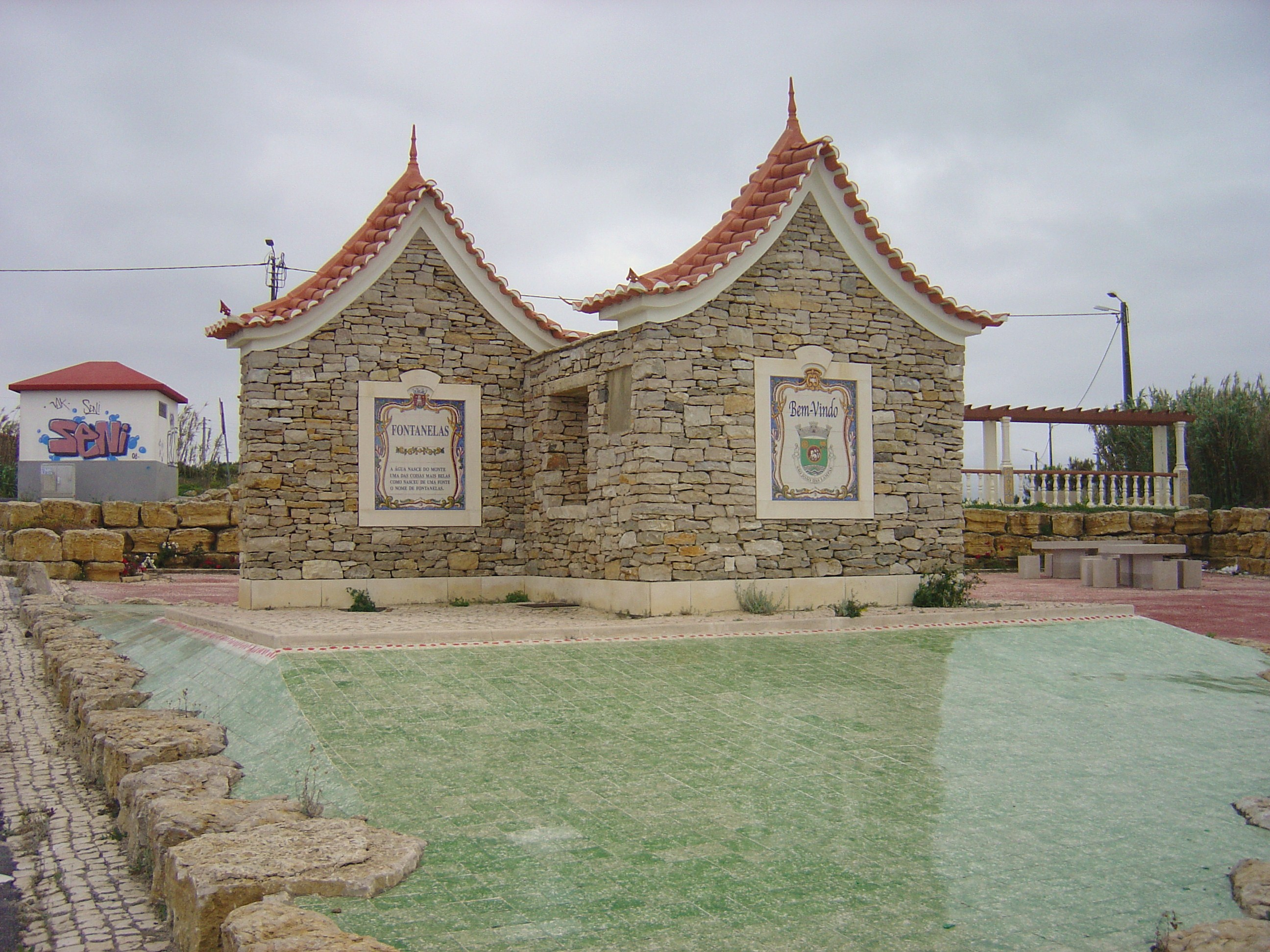
The welcome monument at the entrance of Fontanelas.

Fontanelas is a small town located in the civil parish of São João das Lampas, municipality of Sintra, Portugal. Fontanelas is situated just next to the seaside town of Azenhas do Mar.
