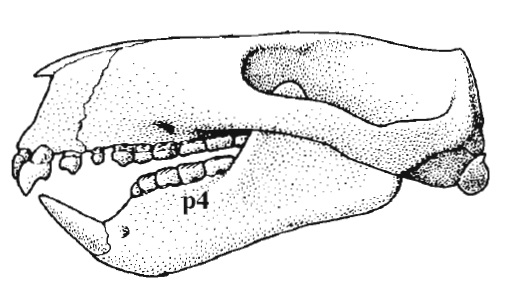

Scientific classification
- Domain: Eukaryota
- Kingdom: Animalia
- Phylum: Chordata
- Class: Mammalia
- Order: †Multituberculata
- Family: †Paulchoffatiidae
- Genus: †Paulchoffatia; Kühne, 1961
- Species: †P. delgadoi

Binomial name
- †Paulchoffatia delgadoi Kühne, 1961

= Paulchoffatia =

Paulchoffatia Temporal range: Late Jurassic - Early Cretaceous

Genus of mammals

Paulchoffatia is a genus of extinct mammal of the Upper Jurassic - Lower Cretaceous. It was a relatively early member of the also extinct order Multituberculata, within the suborder "Plagiaulacida" and family Paulchoffatiidae. It lived in Europe during the "age of the dinosaurs."

The genus Paulchoffatia ("for Paul Choffat") was named by Kühne W.G. in 1961 based on a single species. It is also known as Paulchoffia. Paulchoffatia is characterized by a massive Corpus mandibulae (the part of the jaw below the tooth row), a rounded lower margin of the jaw and a massive, only slightly curved and steeply inclined incisor with a short root", (Hahn & Hahn 2000, p. 105). The name honours the geologist Paul Choffat (1849–1919).

Remains of the species Paulchoffatia delgadoi were found in the Kimmeridgian (Upper Jurassic)-age strata of Guimarota, Portugal. The skull probably had a length of 2.5 cm. This taxon is based on five lower jaw fossils. Further material of this genus, though very possibly not this species, has been reported from the Lower Cretaceous location of Galve, Spain.
