= Paul Choffat =

Swiss-born geologist, stratigrapher and paleontologist

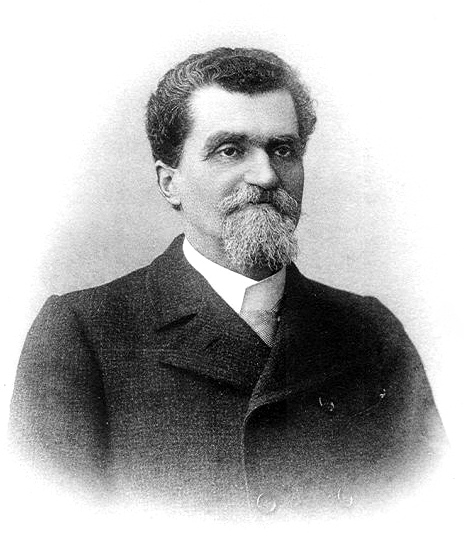
Léon Paul Choffat, 1901

Léon Paul Choffat (14 May 1849 – 6 June 1919) was a Swiss-born geologist, noted as a stratigrapher and paleontologist, who distinguished himself as a study of the pioneer of paleontology of the Jurassic and physical geography of Portugal. Having started his career as an associate professor of animal paleontology at the Federal Polytechnic School of Zurich, (Now ETH Zurich) From 1878 he settled in Portugal, where he spent most of his scientific career and where he died. He is considered a key figure in the history of Portuguese Geology, whose studies are still relevant to the knowledge of the geology of Portugal.

== Biography ==
Born in Porrentruy, canton of Jura in French-speaking Switzerland, from a Soubey (Jura) family, he completed his primary and secondary studies in his homeland. After the high school, left for Besançon, France, where he was employed in a bank house.

During his stay in Besançon he integrated with the local intelligentsia, establishing friendship with various naturalists and developing a great interest in geology. He was a member of the prestigious Société d'Emulation du Doubs. In 1871 he returned to Switzerland and the following year enrolled in the Chemistry and Natural Sciences course at the Federal Polytechnic School of Zurich and the University of Zurich. During his studies he became particularly interested in Paleontology, being a student, among others, of professors Arnold Escher von der Linth and Albert Heim.

Having completed the course in 1876, the distinctive and brilliant manner in which the course was attended, as evidenced by the high standards of consideration it received from its teachers, led to that honorable appointment that same year as an aggregate professor of Animal Paleontology at the Federal Polytechnic School. from Zurich, where he had studied. He then began a research course in the field of paleontology, to which he devoted himself full-time, applying the early years of his career to the study of the Jurassic terrain of France and Switzerland, a subject in which he became an expert. During this period he met numerous geologists and paleontologists, contacts that he maintained throughout his scientific life.

During the International Congress of Geology, held in Paris in 1878, he met Portuguese geologist Carlos Ribeiro (1813–1882), president of the Kingdom Geological Commission, who invited him to visit Portugal for the special purpose of studying the stratigraphy of Jurassic terrain. Given that at the time I suffered from pharyngitis Chronicle, who had been advised to cure in a dry, sunny climate, decided to accept the invitation, arriving in Lisbon in October 1878, proposing to stay in Portugal for three months, long enough to cure her illness. However, he would eventually stay in Portugal for about 40 years, until the end of his life, starting a research course on the geology of Portugal that would make him famous.

Working for many years as an independent researcher, it was not until 1883 that he was officially hired as a geologist for the Geological Commission of the Kingdom (precursor of the Geological Services of Portugal). He initially devoted himself to the study of Mesozoic formations, but then broadened his field of interest, performing multiple works of applied geology, including research and characterization of mineral waters from the Mesozoic regions, and studies of western tectonics. of the Iberian Peninsula. He also devoted himself to the study of prehistoric lithic structures, a matter in which he was in many ways pioneer in Portugal.

Also he devoted himself to geological mapping, one of the authors of the geological map of the country on the scale 1:500,000, published in 1899, which came to replace the one that had been published in 1876 by Carlos Ribeiro and Delgado. He played an important role in the elaboration of this letter, one of the best works of Portuguese geological cartography, collaborating intensely with Nery Delgado, the military engineer who at the time chaired the Geological Commission and headed the Geological Works Section. The cartographic studies he then carried out allowed him to publish a tectonic chart and a hypsometric chart of Portuguese territory. In the memory accompanying the hypsometric chart includes a set of studies on the physical geography of the Portuguese territory, still considered relevant today. In addition to the works of Portuguese theme, in the period prior to his coming to Portugal, he published several works concerning the paleontology and stratigraphy of the French and Swiss Jurassic lands, among which are worth mentioning the works that make up the work Esquisse du callovien et de The Oxfordien of the Middle Jura: Suivie of a Supplementary Aid to the Acanthicus Ammonites of the Occidental Jura, originally published in volumes III and IV of the Annals of the Geological Society of France.

Paul Choffat's hundreds of studies on Portuguese geology cover a wide range of themes, from the secondary formations of Portugal, to hydrogeology and tectonics, to various aspects of geotechnics (at the time viewed as applied geology). Among the various publications of his own, there are three general studies of great relevance to the knowledge of the geology of Portugal, one on the Jurassic and two on the Cretaceous:

- Stratigraphic and palaeontological etude of jurassic terrains of Portugal - Le Lias and Dogger au Nord du Tage (1880);
- Collection of Stratigraphic Monographs on the Cretacic Syndrome of Portugal - 1st. étude - Contres de Cintra, by Bellas et de Lisbonne (1885);
- Replica of Monographies Stratigraphiques sur le crème crème - 2éme. étude - The Crétacique au Nord du Tage (1900).

In those works established the stratigraphic classification of the Portuguese sedimentary formations, describing the respective faunas, lithological composition and facies. Another pioneering work is the essay entitled Essai sur la Tectonique de la Chaîne de l'Arrabida (1908), recently republished.

In the monographs he publishes about the Portuguese sedimentary formations he creates the Lusitanian, describes the Bathonian and Senonian floors and separates the Trias from the Infralias. In this context it is to relieve the creation of floor Lusitaniano for stratigraphic set Oxfordian upper and Kimmeridgian temporarily accepted and often still referred to. He also defined the floor he designated by Belasiano (meanwhile fallen into disuse), represented in the Belas region, outside Lisbon, consisting of marl andlimestones with a silicyblastic series at the base, corresponding to part of the Cenomanian.

The prestige he enjoyed inside and outside Portugal led to his being honored in the paleontological nomenclature, with Choffatella, a genus of foraminifera, and Choffatia, a genus of ammonites. Among others it is eponymous of the species Perisphinctes cf choffati, an ammonite, and Callavia choffati, a trilobite.

In the field of geotechnics he elaborated a study for the drilling of the Rossio Tunnel, considered a pioneer work at the time, and was frequently consulted on works related to geology, giving advice on the best way to perform the works. He conducted surveys of the Abelheira and Pedra Furada ( Sabugo ) Cretaceous massifs, allowing groundwater flows to be found at 330 and 380 meters deep, and his work on the mineral waters of the Mesozoic regions is considered an exceptional hydrology work based on geology.

One field to which he devoted particular attention was the publication of geological maps, collaborating with Nery Delgado in the geological survey of Portuguese territory that is the origin of the geological map published in 1899 and replaced the one that had been published in 1876 by Carlos Ribeiro and Nery Delgado. He also produced several regional maps, including the outskirts of Leiria, Arrábida, the Buarcos-Verride and Montejunto mountains. Although they were not published, he produced several geological maps in the 1:20 000 scale and when he died he was preparing a Description géologique du Portugal, for which he had already collected a lot of data.

Considered to be a “hard-tempered" man "of a physique and temperament (…) audacious in his geological explorations (…) living only for his scientific studies," despite having integrated himself in his homeland of adoption, becoming an individual of prestigious prestige. and one of the most outstanding services in science in Portugal, his relationship with his Portuguese colleagues was not one of the best, so he was considered a loner in his scientific work. Although he worked for 40 years in Portugal, he left no disciples, except the collectors of the Geological Commission and the military engineer and geologist Pereira de Sousa., with whom he later seems to have also become incompatible. His relationship with the geological service deteriorated after Nery Delgado's death in 1908, making him increasingly critical of the course the institution took. As a result, after Paul Choffat's death, the heirs withdrew their entire scientific estate, most of which only returned to Portugal in the 1940s, through the good offices of the Geological Society of Portugal.

He was a member of numerous committees within the International Geology Congress, had honorable scientific titles, and was named for numerous paleontological genera and species. He received the most imminent scientific men of his time due consecration as noted geologist, most notably the remarkable biographical note published by the German geographer Hermann Lautensach upon Paul Choffat birth centenary. In translation by José Custódio de Morais, the note was republished in the "Memoirs and News" inserted in the Publications series of the Mineralogical and Geological Museum of the University of Coimbra (No. 25, 1949). A biography by Ernest Fleury (1878-1958), also Swiss and a continuator of his work in Portugal, was also published.

In contrast to its relationship with Portuguese geologists, it maintained intense international cooperation, being a member of multiple academies and scientific societies. He was a correspondent partner of the Academy of Sciences of Lisbon, the Royal Academy of Sciences of Madrid, the Geological Society of London, the Royal Academy of Sciences and Arts of Barcelona, the Institute of Coimbra, the Academy of Sciences and Fine Arts of Besançon, the Portuguese Academy of Sciences, the Royal Spanish Society of Natural Sciences of Madrid, the Natural History Society of Basel, the Geographic Society of Geneva, the Natural History Society of Toulouse and the Argen Society of Agriculture, Science and Arts. He was also a member of the Association of Portuguese Civil Engineers, of the Geography Society of Lisbon, of the Portuguese Society of Natural Sciences., the Porrentruy Jurassic Emulation Society and the Jura Emulation Society. He has been an honorary member of the Belgian Society of Geology, Paleontology and Hydrology, the Society of Physics and Natural History of Geneva, the Swiss Society of Natural Sciences, the Society of Chemistry and Natural History of Zurich, the Russian Society of Mineralogy and the Society of Sciences. Lausanne naturals.

In 1892 he was made honorary doctor of the University of Zurich and in 1900 received the Auguste Viquesnel Prize ( Prix Auguste Viquesnel ) conferred by the Geological Society of France, the first time the prestigious prize was given to a foreigner. He was also distinguished with the degree of Commander of the Order of Isabel the Catholic of Spain (in 1892) and the degree of Commander of the Order of Santiago (in 1896).
