= Gouveia, Sintra =

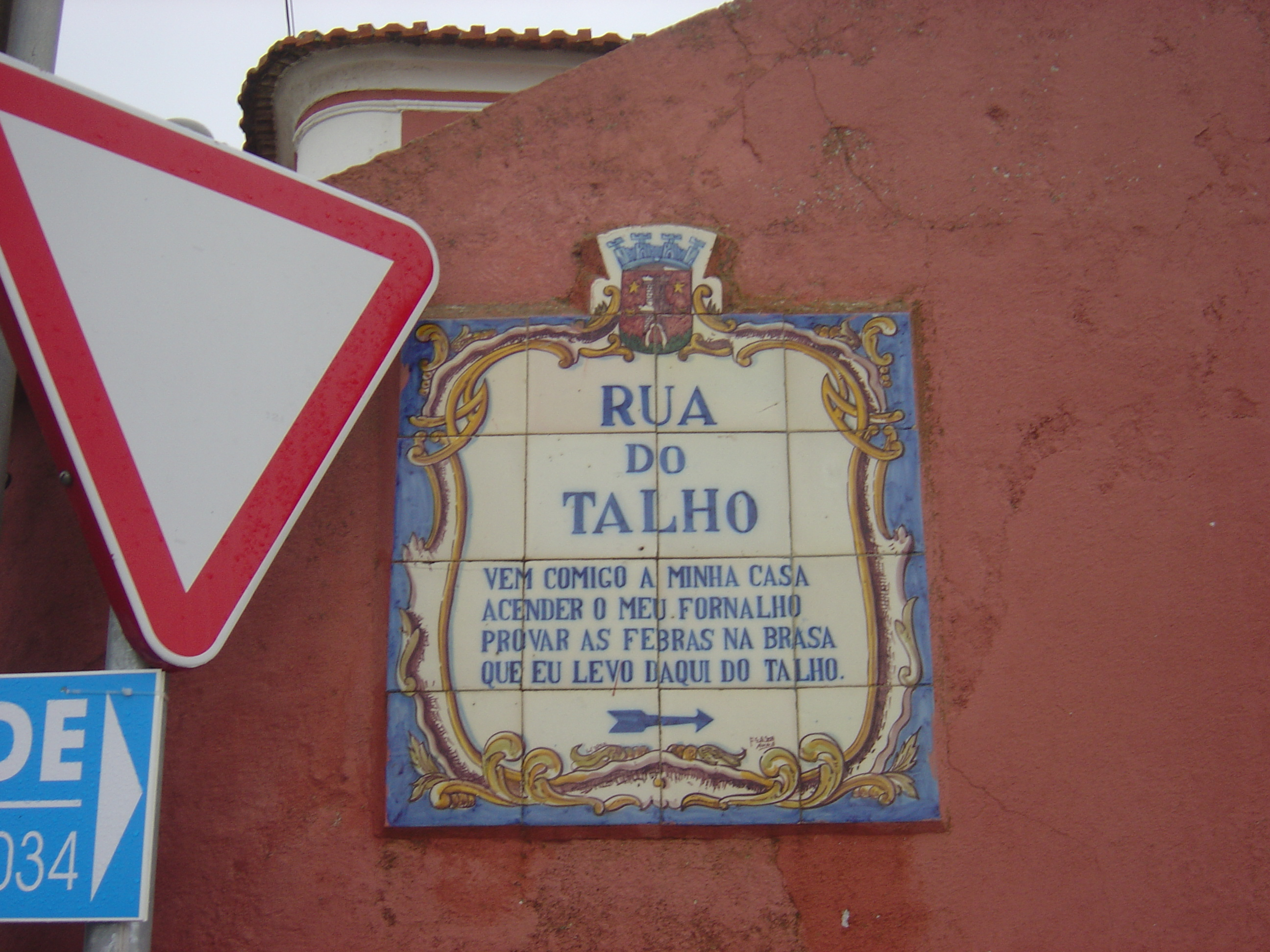
A typical street sign in Gouveia carrying a stanza (in this case, the "Butcher's street").

Gouveia is a village located in Sintra Municipality, next to the town of Fontanelas, Portugal. Gouveia is known as the aldeia em verso (village in verse), for its many Azulejo panels bearing lines of verse. The verses were composed by local poet, José Valentim Lourenço (known as José Massano), and the panels were installed in the 1980s.

While some of the verses are general, most celebrate the particular location where they appear. An example, from Rua das Urtigas (Road of the Nettles), reads: "Não vou nas tuas cantigas / mas por tudo o que ja vi; / antes picar-me em urtigas / que ser picado por ti." (I won't fall for your sweet talk, I've seen too much for that; I'd rather be stung by nettles than stung by you.)

A bust of the poet stands in the village.

The village also holds a chapel, the Capela de Nossa Senhora de Belém, built in 1991 after a local group's pilgrimage to Israel. The altar includes an image carved from olive wood brought back from that journey.
