= Varge Mondar =

Portuguese village

Coordinates: 38°45′23″N 9°20′24″W

Varge Mondar is a small village located in Sintra, Portugal, which is well known for its slow living, tranquility, green spaces and community. Also known to public because of comedian Nuno Markl that spoke about it on his radio show and later became an ambassador for the village.

The village is located between two train stations, Oeiras and Rio de Mouro.

== The Village ==
The village has evolved into a lovely community of single-family and some luxury homes with a lot of commerce and a tight community.

Around it there are a lot of old estates and a lot of green. It is extremely near the Sintra commercial zone like Alegro Sintra and Sintra Retail Park.

It is 20min from “Linha” beaches, that include Santo Amaro de Oeiras Beach and Carcavelos for example.

It has known a big growth over the past years due to its tranquility, commitment to the village and community.

On the other side of the village there is another known village, originally designed and built by Tabaqueira, the largest tobacco company in Portugal, for their employees called “Bairro da Tabaqueira”

== Currently ==
The Varge Mondar village is divided into 2 zones. The zone of "Individual Homes" include single homes with outdoor space but also some bigger luxury homes. The “Buildings" zone include many 3 floored pink buildings with many new families with children with good values and a tight sense of community.

The village has a school for children ages 6–10. Varge Mondar also have a few coffee shops and restaurants, one grocery store, a veterinarian, an English school, a butcher, a laundry, a dental clinic, a tax office a Bank, among others. Has its own group of “escoteiros” and its own summer parties.

There is also a Community Group, called Moradores do Principado de Varge Mondar that work together trying to find solutions to community problems, are extremely proactive and do their best to keep the village always clean and beautiful, eclectic and promote togetherness.
