= Abelheira =

Coordinates: 39.2801°N 9.3069°W

- Village
- Interactive map of Abelheira
- Country: Portugal

Abelheira is a village in the Lourinhã Municipality of Portugal.

Abelheira is one of the smallest villages in the Lourinhã Municipality. It has a recreation center, a café, a church and a cemetery. It also has a nearby beach. Most people there are farmers.

There is also a dinosaur theme park.
