= Tiffanian =

North American faunal stage

The Tiffanian North American Stage on the geologic timescale, is a North American faunal stage within the North American Land Mammal Ages chronology (NALMA). It occupies part of the Paleocene epoch, spanning an interval from about 60,900,000 to 57,500,000 years Before Present, lasting 3.4 million years.

The Tiffanian overlaps with part of the Selandian (Middle Paleocene) and Thanetian (Late Paleocene), which are stages on the global timescale. In regards to NALMA, the Tiffanian is preceded by the Torrejonian and followed by the Clarkforkian NALMA stages.

== Substages ==
The Tiffanian is considered to contain the following six substages, defined by a succession of species within Plesiadapis, a genus of plesiadapiforms (primate relatives):

- Tiffanian 1 (Ti1): The oldest substage, starting at the first appearance of P. praecursor and ending at the first appearance of P. anceps.
- Tiffanian 2 (Ti2): Starting at the first appearance of P. anceps and ending at the first appearance of P. rex.
- Tiffanian 3 (Ti3): Starting at the first appearance of P. rex and ending at the first appearance of P. churchilli.
- Tiffanian 4 (Ti4): Starting at the first appearance of P. churchilli and ending at the first appearance of P. simonsi.
- Tiffanian 5 (Ti5): Starting at the first appearance of P. simonsi and ending at the first appearance of P. gingerichi.
- Tiffanian 6 (Ti6): Starting at the first appearance of P. gingerichi and ending at the first appearance of rodents in North America.

== Mammal fauna ==
Early dinoceratans (large herbivores) and arctostylopids (small herbivores) immigrated from Asia to North America in the later part of the Tiffanian. Eulipotyphlans (shrew relatives) and plesiadapiforms (primate relatives) diversify, with Plesiadapis, Chiromyoides, microsyopids, and micromomyids joining the primate-like fauna. Carnivorous oxyaenids appear in the Tiffanian, though they were rare compared to later stages. Among bulky herbivores, new species of phenacodonts and pantodonts reached far larger sizes than their predecessors.

Some archaic ungulates of the early-middle Paleocene, such as periptychids and mioclaenids, diminish and make their last appearance in North America during the Tiffanian.

=== Notable mammals ===
Multituberculata - an extinct group of rodent-like non-therian mammals

- Neoplagiaulax, a neoplagiaulacid multituberculate
- Ptilodus, a squirrel-sized ptilodontid

Metatheria - marsupial-like mammals

- Peradectes, a peradectid

Primatomorpha - primates and relatives, most of which are considered plesiadapiforms.

- Carpodaptes, a carpolestid
- Carpolestes, a carpolestid
- Chiromyoides, a small plesiadapid
- Elpidophorus, a plagiomenid (potential colugo relatives)
- Ignacius, a paromomyid
- Micromomys, a micromomyid
- Nannodectes, a basal plesiadapid
- Navajovius, a microsyopid
- Phenacolemur, a paromomyid
- Picrodus, a picrodontid
- Plesiadapis, a plesiadapid

Eulipotyphla - insectivorous mammals, relatives of moles and shrews

- Adunator, an erinaceomorph (hedgehog relative)
- Leptacodon, a nyctitheriid
- Litocherus, an erinaceomorph

Pantodonta - an extinct group of herbivorous mammals

- Barylambda, a large barylambdid pantodont with a tapir-like lifestyle
- Caenolambda, a medium-sized pantolambdid pantodont
- Cyriacotherium, a small cyriacotheriid (potential pantodonts)
- Titanoides, a large titanoideid pantodont with a bear-like appearance

Ferae - carnivorans (the group containing most living carnivorous mammals) and their relatives

- Protictis, a viverravid carnivoran
- Raphictis, a viverravid carnivoran
- Tytthaena, a tytthaenine oxyaneid

"Condylarthra" - a broad category of archaic herbivorous or omnivorous mammals, including possible ancestors to various ungulates (hoofed mammals)

- Chriacus, a raccoon-like arctocyonid condylarth
- Claenodon, a large arctocyonid condylarth
- Ectocion, a phenacodontid condylarth
- Lambertocyon, an arctocyonid condylarth
- Periptychus, a periptychid condylarth
- Phenacodus, a phenacodontid condylarth
- Promioclaenus, a mioclaenid condylarth
- Thryptacodon, a raccoon-like arctocyonid condylarth

Dinocerata / Uintatheria - an extinct group of large, herbivorous hoofed mammals with tusks and horns

- Probathyopsis / Prodinoceras, an early North American uintathere

Mesonychia - an extinct group of carnivorous hoofed mammals

- Dissacus, a dog-sized mesonychid

Other mammals - extinct groups with unclear relationships to modern mammals

- Arctostylops, an arctostylopid (small herbivores)
- Bisonalveus, a pentacodontid pantolestan (small insectivores)
- Labidolemur, an apatemyid (aye-aye-like arboreal insectivores)
- Palaeictops, a leptictid (hopping insectivores)
- Palaeoryctes, a palaeoryctid (small insectivores)
- Palaeosinopa, a pantolestid pantolestan (otter-like carnivores)
- Prodiacodon, a leptictid (hopping insectivores)
- Psittacotherium, a stylinodontid taeniodont (large stocky herbivores)

== Formations ==
The Tiffanian is named after the "Tiffany beds" near Tiffany, Colorado. These layers are now known as the Animas Formation.

- Alberta:
  - uppermost Porcupine Hills Formation, Paskapoo Formation
- California:
  - Goler Basin: Goler Formation
- Colorado:
  - Piceance Creek Basin: Ohio Creek Formation
  - San Juan Basin: Animas Formation
- Maryland:
  - Aquia Formation (Piscataway Member)
- Montana:
  - Clarks Fork Basin: Fort Union Formation (Polecat Bench Formation)
  - Crazy Mountains Basin: Fort Union Formation, Melville Formation
  - Powder River Basin: Fort Union Formation (Tongue River Member)
- North Dakota:
  - Williston Basin: Tongue River Formation, Sentinel Butte Formation
- Saskatchewan:
  - Ravenscrag Formation
- South Carolina:
  - Williamsburg Formation
- Texas:
  - Big Bend area: Black Peaks Formation
- Wyoming:
  - Bighorn Basin / Clarks Fork Basin: Fort Union Formation (Polecat Bench Formation)
  - Greater Green River Basin
    - Fossil Basin: Evanston Formation
    - Great Divide Basin / Bison Basin: Fort Union Formation
    - Green River Basin: Wasatch Formation (Chappo Member)
    - Washakie Basin: Fort Union Formation
  - Hanna Basin / Carbon Basin: Hanna Formation
  - Hoback Basin: Hoback Formation
  - Wind River Basin and Togwotee Pass area: Fort Union Formation
