= Clarkforkian =

North American faunal stage

The Clarkforkian North American Stage, on the geologic timescale, is the last North American faunal stage of the Paleocene epoch within the North American Land Mammal Ages chronology (NALMA). It spans an interval from around 57,500,000 to 56,000,000 years Before Present.

The Clarkforkian corresponds to part of the Late Paleocene (Thanetian stage on global timescales). The Paleocene-Eocene boundary and Paleocene-Eocene thermal maximum occur close to the end of the Clarkforkian. The Clarkforkian is preceded by the Tiffanian and followed by the Wasatchian NALMA stages.

== Substages ==
The Clarkforkian is typically considered to contain the three following substages:

- Clarkforkian 1 (Cf1): The oldest substage, starting at the first appearance of true rodents in North America and ending at the first appearance of the plesiadapiform (primate relative) Plesiadapis cookei.
- Clarkforkian 2 (Cf2): The second substage, starting at the first appearance of Plesiadapis cookei and ending at its last appearance (and presumed extinction).
- Clarkforkian 3 (Cf3): The youngest substage, starting at the last appearance of Plesiadapis cookei alongside an abundance of the tillodont Esthonyx grangeri and the paromomyid primate Phenacolemur praecox.

An alternative two-part subdivision is proposed by Anemone et al. (2024). This system is based on mammal groups which immigrate to North America from other continents. Plesiadapis cookei is not used as an index taxon in this system, since its distribution is probably influenced more by climate and geography rather than a time-constrained biological event.

- Clarkforkian 1 (Cf-1): The oldest substage, starting at the first appearance of true rodents in North America and ending at the first appearance of the pantodont Coryphodon and the miacid Uintacyon.
- Clarkforkian 2 (Cf-2): The youngest substage, starting at the first appearance of the pantodont Coryphodon and the miacid Uintacyon, and ending at the first appearance of perissodactyls in North America.

== Mammal fauna ==
The Clarkforkian sees the first appearance of true rodents and miacid carnivorans in North America. Tillodonts (not counting the unusual Deltatherium) and the distinctive pantodont Coryphodon also arrive in North America during this stage.

=== Notable mammals ===
Multituberculata - an extinct group of rodent-like non-therian mammals

- Ectypodus, a neoplagiaulacid multituberculate
- Microcosmodon, a microcosmodontid multituberculate
- Prochetodon, a ptilodontid multituberculate

Metatheria - marsupial-like mammals

- Peradectes, a peradectid

Rodentia - rodents

- Alagomys, an alagomyid rodent
- Paramys, an ischyromyid rodent

Primatomopha - primates and relatives

- Carpolestes, a carpolestid plesiadapiform
- Chiromyoides, a small plesiadapid plesiadapiform
- Niptomomys, a microsyopid plesiadapiform
- Phenacolemur, a paromomyid plesiadapiform
- Plagiomene, a plagiomenid (potential colugo relatives)
- Plesiadapis, a plesiadapid plesiadapiform
- Tinimomys, a tiny micromomyid plesiadapiform

Eulipotyphla - insectivorous mammals, relatives of moles and shrews

- Leipsanolestes, a potential erinaceid (hedgehogs and kin)
- Plagioctenodon, a nyctitheriid
- Wyonycteris, a nyctitheriid

Pantodonta - an extinct group of herbivorous mammals

- Barylambda, a large barylambdid pantodont with a tapir-like lifestyle
- Coryphodon, a large coryphodontid pantodont with a semi-aquatic, hippo-like lifestyle
- Cyriacotherium, a small cyriacotheriid (potential pantodonts)

Ferae - carnivorans (the group containing most living carnivorous mammals) and their relatives

- Oxyaena, a semi-arboreal oxyaenine oxyaenid
- Didymictis, a viverravid carnivoran
- Palaeonictis, a palaeonictine oxyaenid
- Palaeanodon, a palaeanodont (pangolin relatives)
- Uintacyon, a miacid carnivoran

"Condylarthra" - a broad category of archaic herbivorous or omnivorous mammals, including possible ancestors to various ungulates (hoofed mammals)

- Apheliscus, a hyopsodontid condylarth
- Ectocion, a phenacodontid condylarth
- Phenacodus, a phenacodontid condylarth
- Thryptacodon, a raccoon-like arctocyonid condylarth

Dinocerata / Uintatheria - an extinct group of large, herbivorous hoofed mammals with tusks and horns

- Probathyopsis, an early uintathere

Mesonychia - an extinct group of carnivorous hoofed mammals

- Dissacus, a dog-sized mesonychid

Other mammals - extinct groups with unclear relationships to modern mammals

- Arctostylops, an arctostylopid (small herbivores)
- Ectoganus, a stylinodontid taeniodont (large stocky herbivores)
- Esthonyx, an esthonychid tillodont (medium-sized digging herbivores)
- Labidolemur, an apatemyid (arboreal insectivores)
- Palaeoryctes, a palaeoryctid (small insectivores)
- Palaeosinopa, a pantolestan (otter-like carnivores)

== Fossil localities ==
The Clarkforkian is named after the Clarks Fork Basin in Wyoming, known for its exposures of the Polecat Bench Formation. Some examples of strata preserving Clarkforkian-age fossils include:

- Colorado:
  - Piceance Creek Basin: DeBeque Formation (Plateau Valley local fauna, Big Rock Ranch local fauna)
- Montana:
  - Clarks Fork Basin: Fort Union Formation (Bear Creek)
- Wyoming:
  - Bighorn Basin / Clarks Fork Basin: Willwood Formation / Fort Union Formation / Polecat Bench Formation (Rough Gulch, Foster Gulch, Ries)
  - Greater Green River Basin
    - Great Divide Basin: Fort Union Formation? (Twelvemile Gulch local fauna)
    - Green River Basin: Wasatch Formation Chappo Member (Buckman Hollow)
    - Washakie Basin: Fort Union Formation (Big Multi Quarry)
  - Purdy Basin (Togwotee Pass area)
