= Fort Union Formation =

Geologic formation in the northwestern United States

- Stratigraphic range: Maastrichtian-Selandian (Lancian-Clarkforkian); ~66–58 Ma
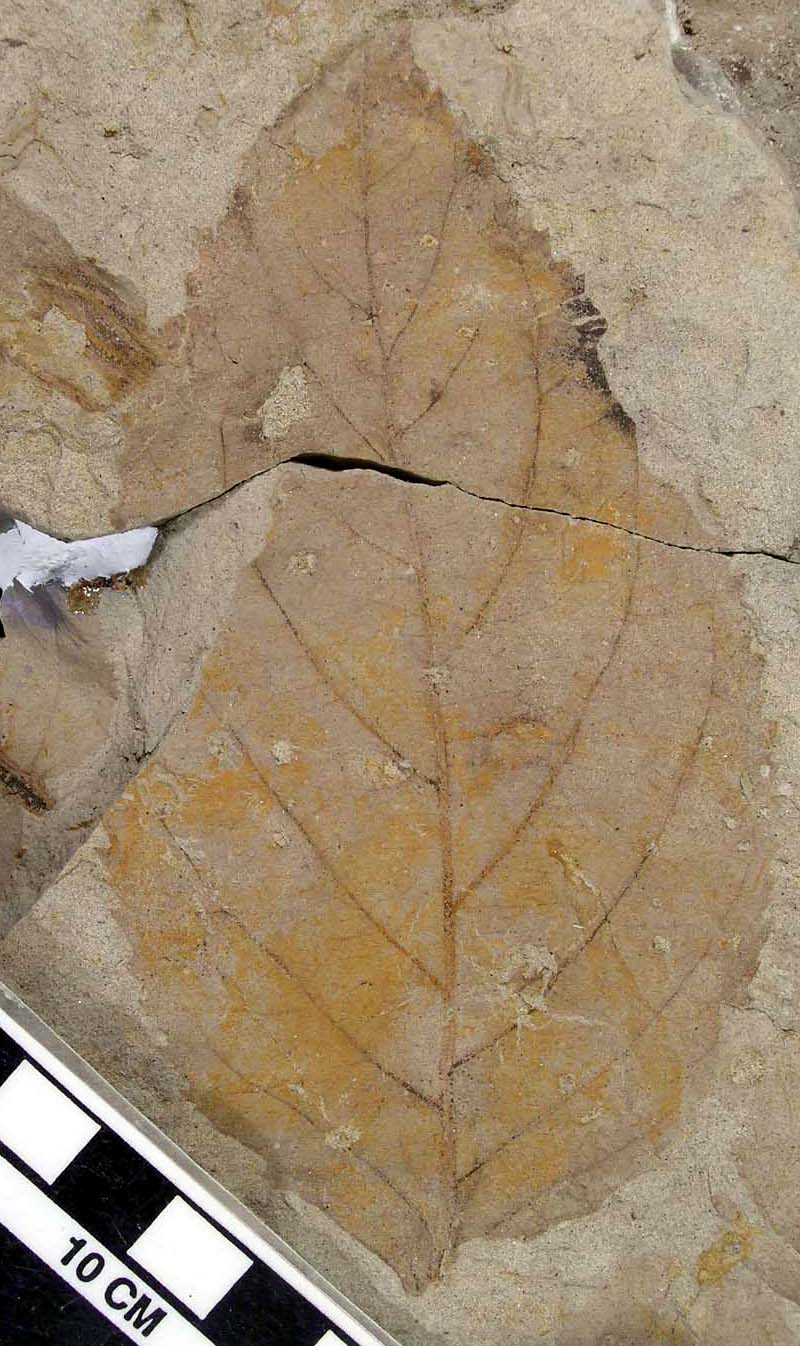
- Browniea serrata from the Fort Union Formation
- Type: Geological formation
- Sub-units: Atwell Gulch, China Butte, Ekalaka, Lebo, lower Ludlow, Overland, Rock Bench Quarry, Sentinel Butte, Shotgun, Somber beds, Tongue River, Tullock, upper Ludlow, Polecat Bench Formation
- Underlies: Wasatch Formation
- Overlies: Hell Creek Formation, Lance Formation

Lithology
- Primary: Sandstone, shale
- Other: Coal

Location
- Coordinates: 47.0°N 104.6°W
- Approximate paleocoordinates: 52.8°N 80.1°W
- Region: Montana, North Dakota; Wyoming, Colorado
- Country: United States
- Extent: Powder River Basin

The Fort Union Formation is a geologic unit containing sandstones, shales, and coal beds in Wyoming, Montana, and parts of adjacent states. In the Powder River Basin, it contains important economic deposits of coal, uranium, and coalbed methane.

== Description ==
The Fort Union is mostly of Paleocene age and represents a time of extensive swamps as well as fluvial and lacustrine conditions. The rocks are more sandy in southwestern Wyoming and more coal-bearing in northeast Wyoming and southeast Montana, reflecting a general change from rivers and lakes in the west to swamps in the east, but all three environments were present at various times in most locations.

Coal in the Fort Union in the Powder River Basin occurs mainly in the Tongue River Member, where as many as 32 coal seams total more than 300 feet in thickness. One such bed, the Wyodak Coal near Gillette, Wyoming, is as much as 110 feet (34 m) thick. Most of the coals in the Fort Union Formation are ranked subbituminous. One Tongue River locality near Bay Horse has a preservational and depositional environment reminiscent of the famous, younger deposits of the Green River Formation from further south, including dominance by the schooling fish Knightia.

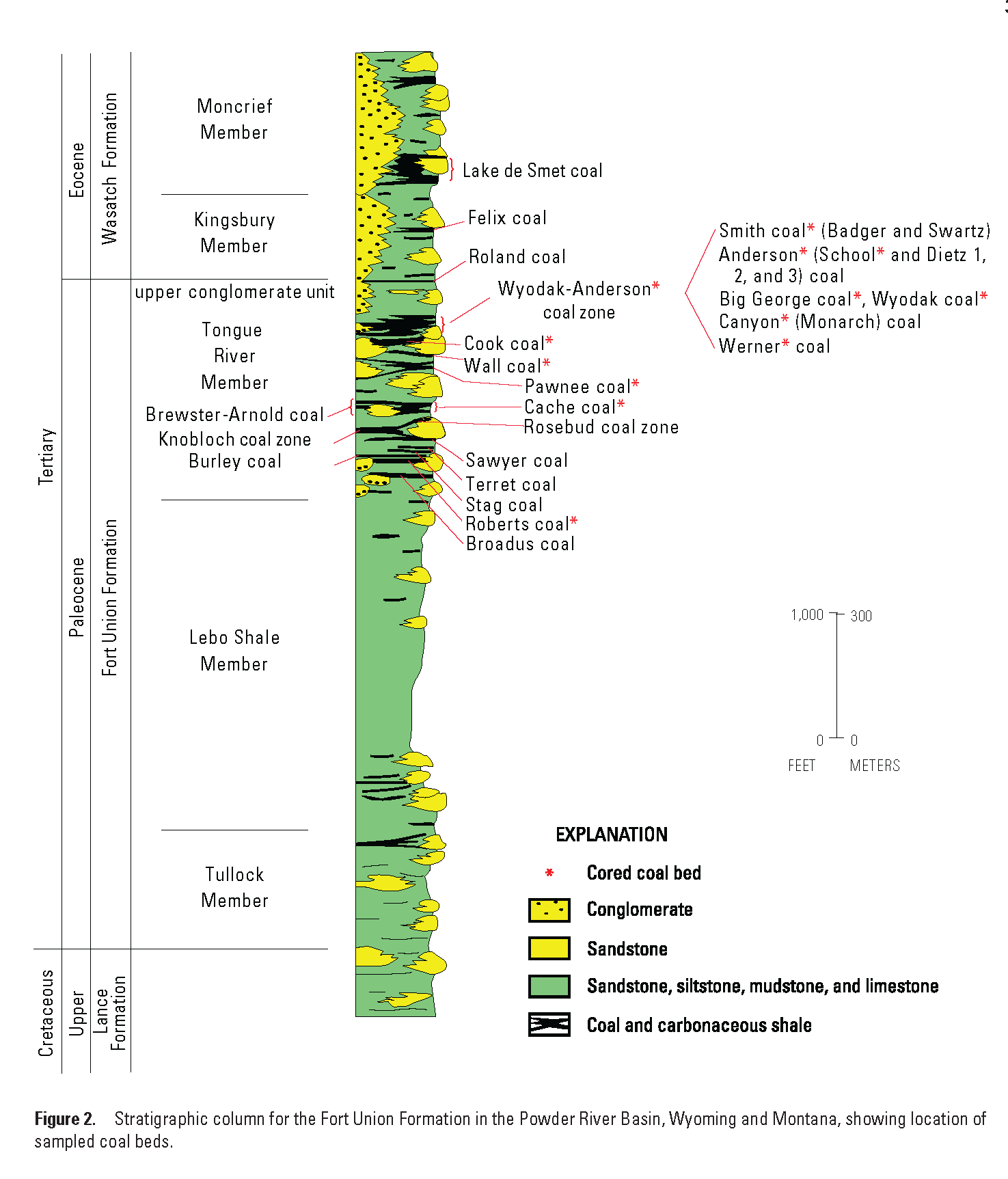
Fort Union Formation - stratigraphy

== Paleobiota ==
Color key
Taxon	Reclassified taxon	Taxon falsely reported as present	Dubious taxon or junior synonym	Ichnotaxon	Ootaxon	Morphotaxon

Notes
Uncertain or tentative taxa are in small text; ~~crossed out~~ taxa are discredited.

=== Plants ===
==== Ferns and fern allies ====
Family	Genus	Species	Locality	Stratigraphic member	Material	Notes	Images
Dennstaedtiaceae?	Cf. Dennstaedtia	Cf. †D. americana	Custer National Forest.	Tongue River Member.	A single specimen of sterile foliage (UF 18969-34532).	A fern.	
Equisetaceae	Equisetum	E. sp.	Custer National Forest, Powder River County, Montana.	Tongue River Member.	A single stem (UF 18969-60476A).	A horsetail.	

==== Cycads ====
Family	Genus	Species	Locality	Stratigraphic member	Material	Notes	Images
Zamiaceae	†Eostangeria	†E. pseudopteris	Sweetwater County, Wyoming.	Upper part of the formation.	Multiple specimens.	A cycad.	

==== Conifers ====
Family	Genus	Species	Locality	Stratigraphic member	Material	Notes	Images
Cupressaceae	Glyptostrobus	†G. europaeus	Mexican Hat locality.	Lebo Member.	Leafy branches.	A Taxodioid cypress relative.	
Cupressaceae	Taxodium	†T. olrikii	Custer National Forest, Powder River County, Montana.	Tongue River Member.	branchlets	A cypress tree.	

==== Angiosperms ====
Family	Genus	Species	Locality	Stratigraphic member	Material	Notes	Images
Cercidiphyllaceae	"Populus"	†"P". nebrascensis	Mexican Hat locality, Montana.	Lebo Member.	Leaves showing signs of insect damage.	A katsura relative. Likely belonging to †Archeampelos	
Cercidiphyllaceae	†Trochodendroides	†T. genetrix	Mexican Hat locality, Montana; Custer National Forest, Powder River County, Montana.	Lebo Member. Tongue River Member.	Leaves preserve insect damage.	A katsura relative. Formerly called Cercidiphyllum genetrix & Nyssidium arcticum	
Cornaceae	Cornus	†C. swingii	Custer National Forest	Tongue River Member	Leaves	A dogwood.	
Juglandaceae	†Juglandiphyllites	†J. glabra	Mexican Hat locality, Montana.	Lebo Member.	Leaves with insect damage including probable lepidopteran leaf mines.	A member of the walnut family.	
Juglandaceae	†Polyptera	†P. manningii	Mexican Hat locality	Lebo Member.	Fruits.	A member of the walnut family.	
Lauraceae	incertae sedis	Species 1	Mexican Hat locality, Montana.	Lebo Member.	Leaf with insect piercing and sucking damage.		
Lauraceae	incertae sedis	Species 2	Mexican Hat locality, Montana.	Lebo Member.	Leaves preserving insect damage.		
Nelumbonaceae	†Paleonelumbo	†P. macroloba	Mexican Hat locality.	Lebo Member.	Leaves.	A nelumbonaceaen.	
Nyssaceae	†Amersinia	†A. obtrullata	Custer National Forest, Powder River County, Montana.	Tongue River Member.	Fruits.	May be fruits belonging to Beringiaphyllum cupanioides.	
Nyssaceae	†Beringiaphyllum	†B. cupanioides	Custer National Forest.	Tongue River Member.	Leaf (UF 18969-60464).	May be leaves belonging to Amersinia obtrullata.	
Nyssaceae	†Browniea	†B. serrata	Mexican Hat locality Custer National Forest	Lebo Member; Tongue River Member.	Leaves preserve insect damage.		
Nyssaceae	Davidia	†D. antiqua	Custer National Forest.	Tongue River Member.	Leaves & fruits.	A dove tree.	
Platanaceae	†Macginicarpa	†M. manchesteri	Seven Mile Creek, Montana		fruits	A platanaceous fruiting head	
Platanaceae	†Macginistemon	†M. mikanoides	Custer National Forest.	Tongue River Member.	Stamen groups.	A platanaceous fruitlet.	
Platanaceae	†Macginitiea	†M. gracilis	Custer National Forest.	Tongue River Member.	A fragmentary leaf (UF 18969-38380).	A platanaceous leaf.	
Platanaceae	†Macginitiea	†M. nascens	Williston Basin.	Ludlow Member.	Leaves.	A platanaceous leaf.	
Platanaceae	†Platanites	†P. raynoldsii	Mexican Hat locality, Montana.	Lebo Member.	Leaves showing signs of insect damage.	A plane-tree relative. Formerly called Platanus raynoldsii	
Platanaceae	Platanus	P. sp.	Custer National Forest	Tongue River Member.	Leaves.	A plane-tree.	
Polygonaceae	†Paranymphaea	†P. crassifolia	Mexican Hat locality	Lebo Member.	Leaves.	A buckwheat relative. First described as a water lily relative.	
Sapindaceae	Aesculus	†A. hickeyi	Custer National Forest, Powder River County, Montana.	Tongue River Member.	Leaves.	A horse chestnut.	
Sabiaceae	Meliosma	†M. thriviensis	Williston Basin.	Ludlow Member.	Leaves.	A sabiaceaen.	
Sabiaceae	Meliosma	†M. vandaelium	Williston Basin.	Tongue River Member.	Multiple leaves.	A sabiaceaen.	
Trochodendraceae?	†Nordenskioeldia	†N. borealis	Custer National Forest	Tongue River Member.	Fruit.	A stem-trochodendrale. The fruits belonging to Zizyphoides flabella	
Trochodendraceae?	†Zizyphoides	†Z. flabella	Mexican Hat locality Custer National Forest	Lebo Member & Tongue River Member.	Leaves showing signs of insect damage.	A stem-trochodendrale. The leaves belonging to Nordenskioeldia borealis	
Theaceae	†Ternstromites	cf. †T. aureavallis	Mexican Hat locality, Montana.	Lebo Member.	Leaf with a gall at the intersection of primary and secondary veins.	A theaceaen.	
Theaceae	†Ternstromites	†T. paucimissouriensis	Williston Basin	Ludlow Member; Tongue River Member.	Leaves.	A theaceaen.	
Ulmaceae	†Ulmites	†U. microphylla	Custer National Forest	Tongue River Member.	Leaves.	An elm relative.	
Incertae sedis	†Dicotylophyllum	†D. hansonium	Williston Basin, North Dakota.	Tongue River Member.	Leaves.	A dicot of uncertain affinity.	
Incertae sedis	†Dicotylophyllum	†D. horsecreekium	Williston Basin.	Ludlow Member.	Leaves.	A dicot of uncertain affinity.	
Incertae sedis	†Mciveraephyllum	†M. nebrascensis	Mexican Hat locality.	Lebo Member.	Leaves with signs of hole feeding and insect mining.	A dicot of uncertain affinity. Formerly called “Ficus” artocarpoides.	
Incertae sedis	†Phyllites	†P. demoresii	Custer National Forest	Tongue River Member.	Leaves.		A dicot of uncertain affinity.
Incertae sedis	†Porosia	†P. verrucosa	Custer National Forest.	Tongue River Member.	Fruits.	A possible rutaceaen.	

=== Invertebrates ===
==== Bivalves ====
Bivalves reported from the Fort Union Formation
Genus	Species	Locality	Stratigraphic member	Material	Notes	Images
Pisidium	P. sp. indet.	Powder River Basin.	Tongue River Member.	8 specimens.	A sphaeriid.	
Pisidium	P.? sp. indet.	Powder River Basin.	Tongue River Member.	3 specimens.	A sphaeriid.	
Plesielliptio	P. priscus	Powder River Basin.	Tongue River Member.	Numerous specimens.	A unionid.	
Plesielliptio	cf. P. priscus	Powder River Basin.	Tongue River Member.	Several specimens.	A unionid.	
Plesielliptio	P. silberlingi	Powder River Basin.	Tongue River Member.	Numerous specimens.	A unionid.	
Plesielliptio	cf. P. silberlingi	Powder River Basin.	Tongue River Member.	6 specimens.	A unionid.	
Plesielliptio	P. sp. indet.	Powder River Basin.	Tongue River Member.	2 specimens.	A unionid.	
Sphaeriidae	Gen. & sp. indet.	Powder River Basin.	Tongue River Member.	Numerous specimens.	A sphaeriid.	
Sphaerium	S. sp. indet.	Powder River Basin.	Tongue River Member.	1 specimen.	A sphaeriid.	
Sphaerium	S.? sp. indet.	Powder River Basin.	Tongue River Member.	Several specimens.	A sphaeriid.	
Unionidae	Gen. & sp. indet.	Powder River Basin.	Tongue River Member.	11 specimens.	A unionid.	

==== Gastropods ====
Gastropods reported from the Fort Union Formation
Genus	Species	Locality	Stratigraphic member	Material	Notes	Images
Acroloxus	A.? minutus	Powder River Basin.	Tongue River Member.	2 specimens.	A river limpet.	
Acroloxus	A. sp. indet.	Powder River Basin.	Tongue River Member.	1 specimen.	A river limpet.	
Clenchiella	C. n. sp. A	Powder River Basin.	Tongue River Member.	Numerous specimens.	A clenchiellid.	
Clenchiella	C. n. sp. A?	Powder River Basin.	Tongue River Member.	1 specimen.	A clenchiellid.	
Clenchiella	C. cf. C. n. sp. A	Powder River Basin.	Tongue River Member.	10 specimens.	A clenchiellid.	
Clenchiella	C. sp. indet.	Powder River Basin.	Tongue River Member.	30 specimens.	A clenchiellid.	
Hydrobia	H. anthonyi	Powder River Basin.	Tongue River Member.	2 specimens.	A hydrobiid.	
Hydrobia	H. sp. A	Powder River Basin.	Tongue River Member.	Numerous specimens.	A hydrobiid.	
Hydrobia	H. cf. H. sp. A	Powder River Basin.	Tongue River Member.	2 specimens.	A hydrobiid.	
Hydrobia	H. sp. B?	Powder River Basin.	Tongue River Member.	Multiple specimens.	A hydrobiid.	
Hydrobia	H. sp. C?	Powder River Basin.	Tongue River Member.	1 specimen.	A hydrobiid.	
Hydrobia	H. sp. indet.	Powder River Basin.	Tongue River Member.	Multiple specimens.	A hydrobiid.	
Hydrobia	H.? sp. indet.	Powder River Basin.	Tongue River Member.	2 specimens.	A hydrobiid.	
Lioplacodes	L. multistriata	Powder River Basin.	Tongue River Member.	Numerous specimens.	A viviparid.	
Lioplacodes	L. tenuicarinata	Powder River Basin.	Tongue River Member.	Numerous specimens.	A viviparid.	
Lioplacodes	L. tenuicarinata?	Powder River Basin.	Tongue River Member.	11 specimens.	A viviparid.	
Lioplacodes	L. limneaformis	Powder River Basin.	Tongue River Member.	Numerous specimens.	A viviparid.	
Lioplacodes	L. sp. indet.	Powder River Basin.	Tongue River Member.	Numerous specimens.	A viviparid.	
Lioplacodes	L.? sp. indet.	Powder River Basin.	Tongue River Member.	1 specimen.	A viviparid.	
Valvata?	V.? sp. indet.	Powder River Basin.	Tongue River Member.	1 specimen.	A valvatid.	
Viviparus	V. raynoldsanus	Powder River Basin.	Tongue River Member.	Numerous specimens.	A viviparid.	
Viviparus	V. raynoldsanus?	Powder River Basin.	Tongue River Member.	1 specimen.	A viviparid.	
Viviparus	V. cf. V. raynoldsanus	Powder River Basin.	Tongue River Member.	17 specimens.	A viviparid.	
Viviparus	V. sp.	Powder River Basin.	Tongue River Member.	Multiple specimens.	A viviparid.	

=== Fish ===
Family	Genus	Species	Locality	Stratigraphic member	Material	Notes	Images
Acipenseridae	Unnamed	Unnamed	Eagle Mine near Bear Creek, Carbon County, Montana.		A complete lateral scute (YPM VPPU 17066).	A large sturgeon, informally named "Morphotype A"	
Acipenseridae	Unnamed	Unnamed	Highway Blowout Site, Fallon County, Montana.	Tongue River Member.	A complete lateral scute (YPM VPPU 16646).	A large sturgeon, informally named "Morphotype B"	
Acipenseridae	†Engdahlichthys	†E. milviaegis	Montana.	Tullock Member.		A fairly small sturgeon.	
Amiidae	Amia	†A. basiloides	Burns Mine and Eagle Mine near Bear Creek, Carbon County, Montana		A near complete skull and partial skeleton, isolated vertebra	A large bowfin.	
Amiidae	†Cyclurus	C. fragosus	Schaff Quarry, Park County, Wyoming.		3 vertebral centra (PU 21174).	A bowfin.	
Hyperlophidae	†Knightia	†K. vetusta	Bay Horse, Montana	Tongue River Member	28 complete specimens	A herring.	
Lepisosteidae	Atractosteus	†A. grandei	Bowman County, North Dakota.	Lowest Danian strata.		A large gar.	
Polyodontidae	Polyodon	†P. tuberculata	Montana.	Tullock Member.	3 specimens.	A paddlefish.	

=== Mammals ===
==== Cimolestans ====
Cimolestans reported from the Fort Union Formation
Genus	Species	Locality	Stratigraphic member	Material	Notes	Images
Crustulus	C. fontanus	Northeastern Montana.	Tullock Member.	An isolated upper molar.	A pantodont.	

==== Leptictids ====
Leptictids reported from the Fort Union Formation
Genus	Species	Locality	Stratigraphic member	Material	Notes	Images
Prodiacodon	P. crustulum	Garfield & McCone counties, Montana.	Tullock Member.	Fragmentary dentary & isolated teeth.	A leptictid.	

==== Marsupials ====
Marsupials reported from the Fort Union Formation
Genus	Species	Locality	Stratigraphic member	Material	Notes	Images
Peradectes	P. sp.	Swain Quarry, Wyoming.		Upper & lower molars.	Reassigned to Swaindelphys.	
Swaindelphys	S. cifellii	Swain Quarry, Wyoming.		Upper & lower molars.	An opossum.	

==== Primatomorphs ====
Primatomorphs reported from the Fort Union Formation
Genus	Species	Locality	Stratigraphic member	Material	Notes	Images
Carpodaptes	C. sp.	Wind River Basin, Wyoming.	Shotgun Member.	2 isolated fourth lower premolars.	A carpolestid.	
Chiromyoides	C. caesor	Hell's Half Acre (UCM locality 78009), Mesa County, Colorado.		A single upper incisor (UCM 53515).	A plesiadapid.	
Chiromyoides	C. gigas	Piceance Creek Basin, Colorado.		Multiple teeth.	A plesiadapid.	
Chiromyoides	C. sp.	UCM locality 78060, Colorado.		A left molar (UCM 41606).	A plesiadapid.	
Elphidotarsius	E. shotgunensis	Wind River Basin, Wyoming.	Shotgun Member.	Right ramus of mandible & isolated teeth.	A carpolestid.	
Nannodectes	N. gazini	Fremont County, Colorado.		A right maxilla (USGS 16872).	A plesiadapid.	
Palaechthon	P., near P. alticuspis	Wind River Basin, Wyoming.	Shotgun Member.	3 upper molars & 4 lower molars.	A plesiadapiform.	
Palaechthon	P. woodi	Wind River Basin, Wyoming.	Shotgun Member.	A lower jaw & 13 isolated teeth.	A plesiadapiform.	
Palenochtha	P. cf. minor	Wind River Basin, Wyoming.	Shotgun Member.	5 lower teeth.	A plesiadapiform.	
Paromomys	P., near P. depressidens	Wind River Basin, Wyoming.	Shotgun Member.	Approximately 12 upper teeth, 8 isolated lower teeth & a jaw fragment.	A paromomyid.	
Phenacolemur	P. fremontensis	Wind River Basin, Wyoming.	Shotgun Member.	A lower jaw & isolated teeth.	A paromomyid.	
Phenacolemur	P. cf. frugivorus	Wind River Basin, Wyoming.	Shotgun Member.	2 upper molars & 8 isolated lower molars.	A paromomyid.	
Plesiadapis	P. dubius	Piceance Creek Basin, Colorado.		Jaw elements & teeth.	A plesiadapid.	
Plesiadapis	P. fodinatus	Piceance Creek Basin, Colorado.		Jaw elements & teeth.	A plesiadapid.	
Plesiadapis	P. sp.	Wind River Basin, Wyoming.	Shotgun Member.	5 lower molars, 3 anterior upper molars & a premolar.	A plesiadapid.	
Plesiolestes	P. cf. problematicus	Wind River Basin, Wyoming.	Shotgun Member.	Approximately 45 isolated teeth.	A plesiadapiform.	
Pronothodectes	P. intermedius	Wind River Basin, Wyoming.	Shotgun Member.	Jaw elements & teeth.	A plesiadapid.	
Purgatorius	P. janisae	'Harley's Point' UCMP locality V77087, Garfield County, Montana.	Tullock Member.	UCMP 150018 (right m1), and UCMP 192398 (left m3).	A purgatoriid.	
Purgatorius	P. mckeeveri	Garfield County, Montana.	Tullock Member.	Dentary remains & teeth.	A purgatoriid.	
Purgatorius	P. cf. P. mckeeveri	Harley's Point' UCMP locality V77087, Garfield County, Montana.	Tullock Member.	UCMP 150019 (right M2), and UCMP 150020 (right M2).	A purgatoriid.	
Torrejonia	Cf. T. wilsoni	Wind River Basin, Wyoming.	Shotgun Member.	About 14 lower teeth & possibly 3 upper molars.	A plesiadapiform.	
Zanycteris	Z. honeyi	UMC locality number 92177, Colorado.	Atwell Gulch Member.	Right maxilla (UCM 87378).	A plesiadapiform.	

==== Ungulates ====
Ungulates reported from the Fort Union Formation
Genus	Species	Locality	Stratigraphic member	Material	Notes	Images
Dissacus	D. argenteus	Princeton Quarry, Park County, Wyoming.	Upper part of the formation.	Jaw elements & teeth.	A mesonychid.	
Dissacus	D. cf. navajovius	Princeton Quarry, Park County, Wyoming.	Upper part of the formation.	Jaw elements & teeth.	Specimens reassigned to D. argenteus.	
Dissacus	D. praenuntius	Park County, Wyoming.	Upper part of the formation.	Mandible (YPM-PU 16159).	A mesonychid also known from the Willwood Formation.	
Ectocion	E. mediotuber	Princeton Quarry, Wyoming.		Dentary.	A phenacodontid.	
Periptychus	P. carinidens	Makoshika State Park, Montana.			A periptychid also found in the Nacimiento, North Horn, Black Peaks & Animas formations.	
Sigynorum	S. magnadivisus	Great Divide Basin, southern Wyoming.	China Butte Member.		An arctocyonid.	

=== Diapsids ===
==== Birds ====
A partial ornithurine coracoid bone found in this formation is identical to others found in the older Hell Creek Formation. At present, this unnamed species is the only known individual bird species that have survived the Cretaceous–Paleogene extinction event.

Birds reported from the Fort Union Formation
Genus	Species	Locality	Stratigraphic member	Material	Notes	Images
Lithornis	L. celetius	Bangtail Quarry, Sedan Quadrangle, Park County, Montana.			A lithornithid.	

==== Crocodilians ====
Crocodilians reported from the Fort Union Formation
Genus	Species	Location	Stratigraphic member	Material	Notes	Images
Allognathosuchus	A. sp.	Princeton Quarry, Park County, Wyoming.		Anterior end of left dentary (PU 16988).	A crocodilian.	

==== Squamates ====
Squamates reported from the Fort Union Formation
Genus	Species	Locality	Stratigraphic member	Material	Notes	Images
Anguidae	Genus & species indeterminate	Swain Quarry, Carbon County, Wyoming.		Fragmentary jaw elements.	An anguid lizard.	
cf. Anguidae		Swain Quarry, Carbon County, Wyoming.		6 partial dentaries.	Provisionally referred to anguid lizards based on size & shape.	
Contogenys	cf. C. sloani	Swain Quarry, Carbon County, Wyoming.		Posterior part of a right maxilla (AMNH 12069).	A skink.	
Exostinus	E. cf. E. lancensis	Swain Quarry, Carbon County, Wyoming.		4 partial dentaries.	A xenosaurid lizard.	
Exostinus	E. rugosus	Princeton & Schaff quarries, Park County, Wyoming.		Multiple specimens.	A xenosaurid lizard.	
Glyptosaurinae	Genus & species indeterminate	Swain Quarry, Carbon County, Wyoming.		Several jaw remains.	A glyptosaurine lizard.	
Glyptosaurinae or Odaxosaurinae	Genus & species indeterminate	Swain Quarry, Carbon County, Wyoming.		Fragmentary jaw elements & osteoderms.	Indeterminate lizard remains.	
Machaerosaurus	M. torrejonensis	Swain Quarry, Carbon County, Wyoming.		Numerous jaw elements.	An anguid lizard also known from the Nacimiento Formation.	
Odaxosaurus	O. piger	Swain Quarry, Carbon County, Wyoming.		Many fragmentary jaw remains.	An anguid lizard.	
Oligodontosaurus	O. wyomingensis	Park County, Wyoming.		A left mandible (PU 14246).	An amphisbaenian.	
Palaeosaniwa	cf. P. canadensis	Swain Quarry, Carbon County, Wyoming.		Medial part of left dentary (AMNH 15957).	A large anguimorph lizard.	
Palaeoxantusia	P. fera	Swain Quarry, Carbon County, Wyoming.		Numerous jaw elements.	A night lizard.	
Pancelosaurus	P. piger	Princeton, Fritz & Schaff quarries, Park County, Wyoming.		Multiple skull elements.	An anguid lizard.	
Provaranosaurus	P. acutus	Princeton Quarry, Park County, Wyoming.		PU 14243 (left maxilla), 14561 (anterior portion of left dentary) & 17145 ( fragment of left maxilla).	A palaeovaranid lizard.	
Provaranosaurus	cf. P. sp.	Swain Quarry, Carbon County, Wyoming.		3 partial dentaries (AMNH 14306, 14307 & 14309).	A palaeovaranid lizard.	
Rhineuridae	Unidentified genus & species	Fritz Quarry, Park County, Wyoming.		An almost complete right dentary & a broken vertebra (PU 18627).	An amphisbaenian.	
Saniwa	cf. S. sp.	Swain Quarry, Carbon County, Wyoming.		2 trunk vertebrae (AMNH 15960 & 16003).	A varanid.	
Swainiguanoides	S. milleri	Swain Quarry, Carbon County, Wyoming.		Jaw elements.	An iguanid.	

==== Testudines ====
Testudines reported from the Fort Union Formation
Genus	Species	Locality	Stratigraphic member	Material	Notes	Images
Atoposemys	A. entopteros	Montana.	Tullock Member.		A softshell turtle.	
Axestemys	A. montinsana	PTRM Site V02017, Slope County, North Dakota.		Numerous skull, limb & shell fragments.	A softshell turtle also found in the Melville & Denver formations.	
Cardiochelyon	C. rogerwoodi	Reis Quarry, Park County, Wyoming.		Partial skeleton (YPM PU14671).	A kinosternoid formerly thought to be a platysternid.	
Cedrobaena	C. putorius	Cedar Point Quarry, Wyoming.		Shell & skull elements.	A baenid turtle also found in the Hell Creek Formation.	
Hutchemys	H. arctochelys	Burns Mine, Washoe Area, Carbon County, Montana.	Tongue River Member.	Multiple shell elements.	A softshell turtle.	
Hutchemys	H. rememdium	Fallon County, Montana.	Ekalaka Member.	A near complete postcranial skeleton (YPM PU 16795) & shell elements.	A softshell turtle.	
Hutchemys	H. sp.	Duffy's Ranch, Sweet Grass County, Montana.		YPM PU 11566.	A softshell turtle.	
Ptychogaster	P. sp.	Princeton Quarry & Reiss Locality, Park County, Wyoming.		PU 17794 (fragments of the skull & shell), 14671 & 16443 (shells).	A turtle.	
Tullochelys	T. montanus	Montana.	Tullock Member.		A chelydrid turtle also known from the Hell Creek Formation.	

=== Amphibians ===
Amphibians reported from the Fort Union Formation
Genus	Species	Locality	Stratigraphic member	Material	Notes	Images
Amphiuma	A. jepseni	Park County, Wyoming.		PU 14666 (partial vertebral column), 14668 (partial skull) & 16788 (dislocated vertebrae).	An aquatic salamander.	
Anura	Incertae sedis	Park County, Wyoming.		PU 14662 (distal end of right radioulna), 14663 (proximal end of left radioulna), 14669 (phalanx), 13372 (right maxilla).	A frog.	
Discoglossidae	Undescribed genus & species	Park County, Wyoming.		Distal end of right humerus (PU 14670).	A frog similar to undescribed discoglossid remains from the Hell Creek Formation.	
Eorhinophrynus	E. sp.	Princeton & Fritz quarries, Park County, Wyoming.		Humeri & vertebrae.	A burrowing toad.	
Opisthotriton	O. kayi	Princeton Quarry, Park County, Wyoming.		Multiple specimens.	A salamander.	
Scapherpeton	S. tectum	Princeton & Schaff quarries, Park County, Wyoming.		PU 20583 (3 broken vertebrae, an atlas, an ilium & a rib) & PU 19500 (a humerus).	A salamander.	
