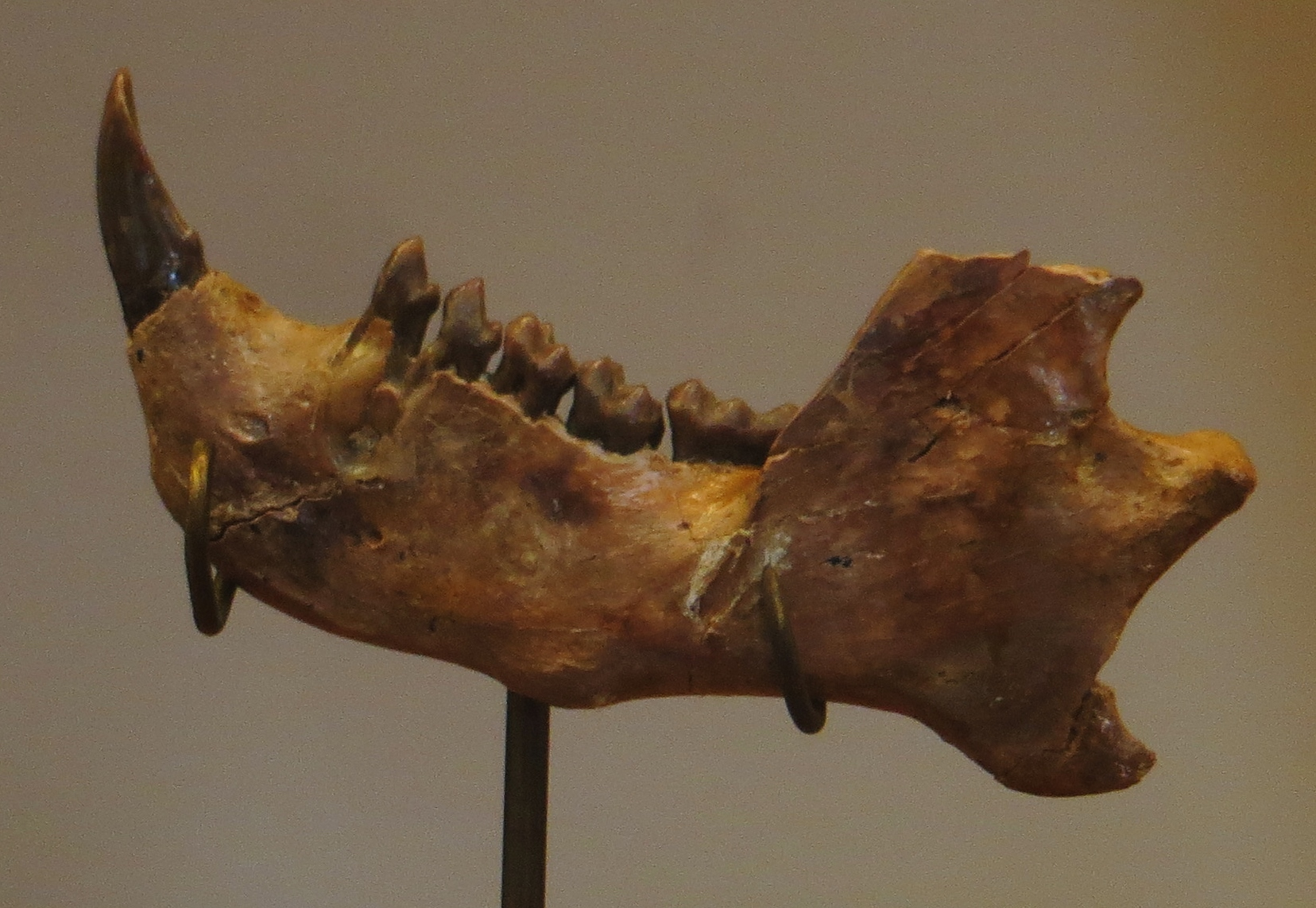
- Plesiadapis tricuspidens jaw

Scientific classification
- Domain: Eukaryota
- Kingdom: Animalia
- Phylum: Chordata
- Class: Mammalia
- Order: Plesiadapiformes
- Clade: Euprimateformes; Bloch et al. 2007

Subgroups
- †Plesiadapoidea; †Toliapinidae?; Euprimates

= Euprimateformes =

Euprimateformes Temporal range: 61.6–0 Ma Selandian to present

Clade of mammals

Euprimateformes are group of plesiadapiformes that includes euprimates and plesiadapoids, proposed by Bloch et al. in 2007.

== Phylogeny ==
Hypothesis of evolutionary relationships for plesiadapiforms and closely related taxa based on the most parsimonious single cladogram from the analysis of maximum parsimony by Bloch et al. (2007).

- Primatomorpha
  - - Scandentia
    - Dermoptera
  - Plesiadapiformes
    - †Purgatoriidae
    - - - †Picromomyidae?
        - †Micromomyidae
      - - - †Microsyopidae
          - - - †Paromomyidae
              - †Palaechthonidae
              - †Picrodontidae?
            - Euprimateformes
              - - †Carpolestidae
                - †Plesiadapidae
                - †Saxonellidae?
              - - †Toliapinidae?
                - Euprimates
