= Saxonella =

Scientific classification
- Domain: Eukaryota
- Kingdom: Animalia
- Phylum: Chordata
- Class: Mammalia
- Order: Plesiadapiformes
- Superfamily: †Plesiadapoidea
- Family: †Saxonellidae
- Genus: †Saxonella; Russell, 1964

Species
- Saxonella crepaturae Russell, 1964; Saxonella naylori Fox, 1991

Extinct genus of primate

Saxonella is a genus of extinct primate from the Paleocene Epoch, 66–56 Ma. The genus is present in the fossil record from around ~62–57 Ma (Torrejonian-Clarkforkian North American Land Mammal Age). Saxonella has been found in fissure fillings in Walbeck, Germany as well as in the Paskapoo Formation in Alberta, Canada. Saxonella is one of five families within the superfamily Plesiadapoidae, which appears in the fossil record from the mid Paleocene to the early Eocene. Analyses of molars by paleontologists suggest that Saxonella most likely had a folivorous diet.

== Taxonomy ==
There are currently two valid species within the genus Saxonella: S. crepaturae and S. naylori. The type species for the genus Saxonella is S. crepaturae, which was discovered in fissure fillings in Walbeck, Germany in 1964; the holotype consisting of a lower jaw preserving the first incisor, third premolar, and first molar. S. naylori was first discovered in the Paskapoo Formation in Alberta, Canada in 1984; the holotype specimen consisting of a lower jaw preserving the first incisor, third and fourth premolars, and the first molar. Both fossils were determined to date to the late Paleocene.

Saxonellidae falls within the superfamily Plesiadapoidea, which also contains Carpolestidae and Plesiadapidae. There is still debate within the paleontological field as to whether or not Paromomyidae and Picrodontidae are also included in this group. Saxonella has dentition that is easily distinguishable from Carpolestids and Plesiadapids, warranting the formation of a new family. Specifically, the upper third premolar has a high degree of specialization. One of the most notable features in this genus is the presence of a plagiaulacoid blade on its lower third premolar. This morphology is not homologous with the lower fourth premolar found in members of the family Carpolestidae and is indicative of evolutionary convergence. This evidence suggests a significant gap in the fossil record, as there must have been ancestors of Saxonella that did not have specialized central incisors or premolars for shearing, as well as lacking a post-incisor lower diastema.

== Description ==
Saxonella’s only lower incisor is procumbent, like that of other plesiadapiforms. It exhibits wear patterns similar to those found in tooth combs used for grooming in members of other taxa. Wear facets on the lower third and fourth premolars, as well as the lower first molar, are indicative of an adaptation for shearing. The lower third premolar has a plagiaulacoid blade and a shearing surface with a 45–60-degree angle. The lower fourth premolar is smaller than the third premolar, a feature that distinguishes this genus from other plesiadapiforms. The upper second premolar is double-rooted. Saxonella has a very specialized upper third premolar which is T-shaped and has the longest anteroposterior length relative to the rest of the upper dentition. Saxonella has one lower incisor and one upper incisor, though it is possible that there were additional upper incisors as there is a lack of incisor preservation in Saxonella specimens. There are no fossils of Saxonella that preserve canines; while it is clear that Saxonella has lost the lower canine, it is possible that an upper canine was present and has not been preserved in the known specimens. The upper second, third, and fourth premolars are present, but it is unclear if there was a first premolar. The lower third and fourth premolars are present, while Saxonella lacked the first and second premolars. The first, second, and third molars are present in both the upper and lower jaws.

== Species ==
Saxonella crepaturae was the first species of Saxonella discovered. The lower first molar and third and fourth premolars of S. crepaturae are more derived than that of S. naylori. The roots of the fourth premolar in S. naylori are unconnected and divergent, while they are not in S. crepaturae. S. crepaturae is not an ancestor of S. naylori. An ancestor of S. naylori would need to possess at least a partially plagiaulacoid third premolar.

== Paleoenvironment and geographic range ==
The known geographic distribution of Saxonella ranges from North America to Europe during the Paleocene. Due to similarities in the faunas of Europe and North America during this time, it is clear that there were land bridges between the two continents. Fossils of Saxonella discovered in Europe and North America are additional evidence of a land bridge between the two continents. Saxonellids likely originated in North America before the middle Tiffanian; their main direction of travel across land bridges was likely west to east. The climate of the Paleocene was cooler than either of the epochs that bordered it. Rather than the tropical trees of the bordering epochs, western North America flora had deciduous trees and conifers.

== Functional morphology ==
Analysis of the lower incisor of Saxonella reveals wear patterns similar to those found in primate fossils that utilized tooth combs for grooming. This may be an indication of similar behavior in Saxonella. Additionally, the wear patterns on upper and lower molars suggest a diet that required shearing, crushing, and grinding, pointing to a folivorous diet. Though post-cranial bones of Saxonella have not been found, their relationship to Plesiadapids and Carpolestids denotes an arboreal and quadrupedal lifestyle.
