= Chiromyoides =

Chiromyoides Temporal range: Thanetian-Ypresian (Clarkforkian-Wasatchian) ~56.8–48.6 Ma

Scientific classification
- Kingdom: Animalia
- Phylum: Chordata
- Class: Mammalia
- Order: †Plesiadapiformes
- Family: †Plesiadapidae
- Genus: †Chiromyoides; Stehlin, 1916

Type species
- †Chiromyoides campanicus Stehlin, 1916

Species
- †Chiromyoides caesor Gingerich, 1973 †Chiromyoides gigas Burger and Honey, 2008 †Chiromyoides gingerichi Secord, 2008 †Chiromyoides kesiwah Beard et al., 2020 †Chiromyoides major Gingerich, 1975 †Chiromyoides mauberti De Bast et al., 2018 †Chiromyoides minor Gingerich, 1975 †Chiromyoides potior Gingerich, 1975

Extinct genus of primates

Chiromyoides is a small plesiadapid primatomorph that is known for its unusually robust upper and lower incisors, deep dentary, and comparatively small cheek teeth. Species of Chiromyoides are known from the middle Tiffanian through late Clarkforkian North American Land Mammal Ages (NALMA) of western North America, and from late Paleocene deposits in the Paris Basin, France.

The unique dental morphology of Chiromyoides has led several authors to propose a specialized ecological role for the genus. Gingerich (1976) hypothesized that Chiromyoides was a specialist on seeds, while Szalay and Delson (1979) and Beard et al. (2020) suggested that it may have consumed wood-boring insects in a manner similar to the aye-aye.

== Origins and discovery ==
The type species of Chiromyoides, Chiromyoides campanicus, was originally described in 1916 from fragmentary craniodental material discovered in Cernay, France, with additional material also later found at Berru. Gingerich (1973) described the first North American species, Chiromyoides caesor, from two upper incisors found in northern Wyoming. Several years later, he described three additional North American species, Chiromyoides major, Chiromyoides minor, and Chiromyoides potior, from isolated upper incisors found in northern Wyoming, southern Wyoming, and southern Colorado, respectively. Secord (2008) named Chiromyoides gingerichi from material found in northern Wyoming and southern Montana, Burger and Honey (2008) named Chiromyoides gigas from several incisors found in northern Colorado, and Beard et al. (2020) named Chiromyoides kesiwah from material found at several localities in southwestern Wyoming. A second European species, Chiromyoides mauberti, was named by De Bast et al. (2018) from isolated teeth and several mandibular fragments found near Rivecourt, France.

== Evolutionary relationships ==
Chiromyoides is known only from isolated teeth, mandibular fragments, and maxillary fragments, and its relationships to other plesiadapiforms are not well understood. Chiromyoides is generally acknowledged to be a member of the family Plesiadapidae, along with Plesiadapis, Platychoerops, Nannodectes, and Pronothodectes. Recent phylogenetic analyses suggest that Chiromyoides is descended from Plesiadapis, perhaps most closely related to Plesiadapis walbeckensis or Plesiadapis tricuspidens.

Beard et al. (2020) found that species of Chiromyoides separated into two distinct clades: a more southern clade consisting of Chiromyoides gigas, C. minor, and Chiromyoides kesiwah from southern Wyoming and Colorado, and a northern clade including Chiromyoides major, Chiromyoides gingerichi, Chiromyoides campanicus, and Chiromyoides mauberti. Chiromyoides caesor formed a polytomy with the two main clades. Chiromyoides potior was not included in their analysis. The nesting of the European species C. campanicus and C. mauberti in the northern clade suggests that Chiromyoides dispersed into Europe from North America.

== Age and biogeography ==
The oldest specimens of Chiromyoides are C. minor from the Chappo Type Locality in Lincoln County, Wyoming, and an edentulous mandible from the Black Peaks region of southwest Texas that has been referred to either C. minor or an indeterminate species of Chiromyoides. Both the Chappo locality and the Ray's Bonebed locality of southwest Texas where the edentulous mandible was found are arguably middle Tiffanian (Ti3) in age. Chiromyoides caesor and C. kesiwah come from slightly younger Tiffanian (Ti4) beds in the Bighorn Basin and Washakie Basin, respectively, while C. potior, C. gigas, C. gingerichi, and C. major come from even younger Tiffanian and Clarkforkian deposits in Colorado, Wyoming, and Montana.

Chiromyoides campanicus comes from localities in the Paris Basin that appear to correlate with the late Tiffanian of North America, while C. mauberti occurs in somewhat younger strata that correlates with the North American Clarkforkian NALMA.
