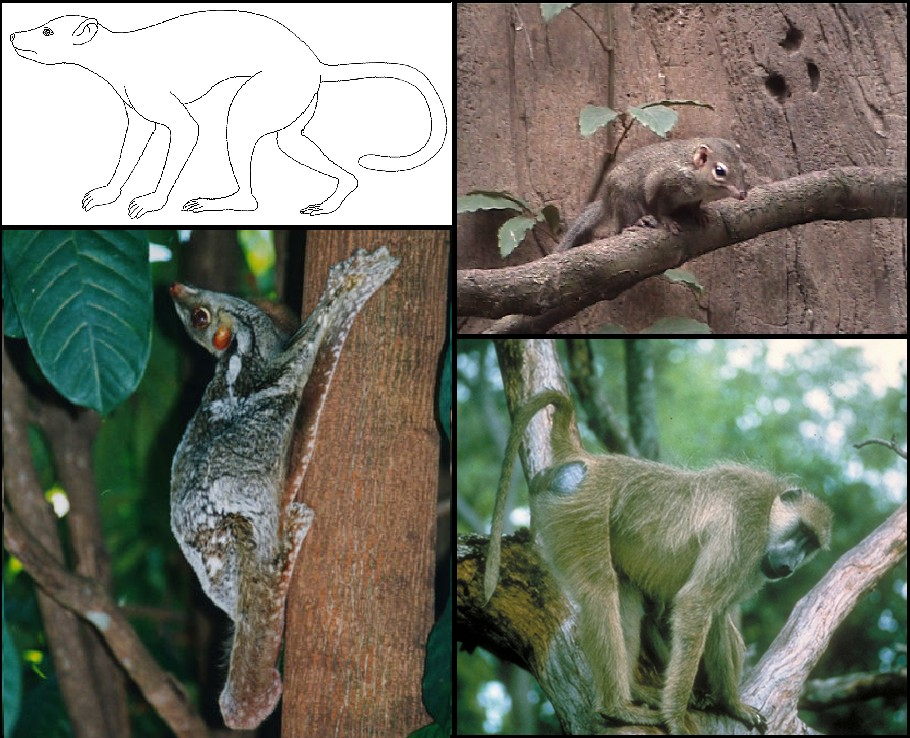
- Euarchonts: upper left: Plesiadapis, upper right: northern treeshrew, lower left: Sunda flying lemur and lower right: yellow baboon

Scientific classification
- Kingdom: Animalia
- Phylum: Chordata
- Class: Mammalia
- Superorder: Euarchontoglires
- Grandorder: Euarchonta; Waddell et al. 1999

Subgroups
- Scandentia; Primatomorpha; Dermoptera; †Mixodectidae; †Plagiomenidae?; †"Plesiadapiformes" (paraphyletic); Primates

= Euarchonta =

Euarchonta Temporal range: Paleocene – Recent, 66–0 Ma

Mammal grandorder containing treeshrews, colugos, and primates

The Euarchonta are a proposed grandorder of mammals: the order Scandentia (treeshrews), and its sister Primatomorpha mirorder, containing the Dermoptera (colugos) and the primates (Plesiadapiformes and descendants).

== Terminology ==
The term "Euarchonta" (meaning "true rulers") appeared in 1999, when molecular evidence suggested that the morphology-based Archonta should be trimmed down to exclude Chiroptera. Further DNA sequence analyses supported the Euarchonta hypothesis. Despite multiple papers pointing out that some mitochondrial sequences showed unusual properties (particularly murid rodents and hedgehogs) and were likely distorting the overall tree, and despite earlier studies showing near total congruence of mtDNA-based and nuclear-based trees when such sequences were excluded, some authors continued to produce misleading trees. A study investigating retrotransposon presence/absence data has claimed strong support for Euarchonta. Some interpretations of the molecular data link Primates and Dermoptera in a clade (mirorder) known as Primatomorpha, which is the sister of Scandentia. In some, the Dermoptera are a member of the primates rather than a sister group. Other interpretations link the Dermoptera and Scandentia together in a group called Sundatheria as the sister group of the primates.

== Euarchontoglires ==
Euarchonta and Glires together form the Euarchontoglires, one of the four eutherian clades.

== Evolutionary history ==
The current hypothesis, based on molecular clock evidence, suggests that the Euarchonta arose in the late Cretaceous period, about 88 million years ago, and diverged 86.2 million years ago into the groups of tree shrews and Primatomorpha. The latter diverged prior to 79.6 million years into the orders of Primates and colugos. The earliest fossil species often ascribed to Euarchonta (Purgatorius coracis) dates to the early Paleocene, 65 million years ago, but one study claims it to be a non-placental eutherian. Although it is known that Scandentia is one of the most basal clades of Euarchontoglires, the exact phylogenetic position is not yet considered resolved, and it may be a sister of Glires, Primatomorpha or Dermoptera or to all other Euarchontoglires.

- Euarchontoglires
  - Glires
    - Lagomorpha (rabbits, hares, pikas)
    - Rodentia (rodents)
  - Euarchonta
    - Scandentia (treeshrews)
    - Primatomorpha
      - - Dermoptera (colugos)
      - - Primates (†Plesiadapiformes, Strepsirrhini, Haplorrhini)
