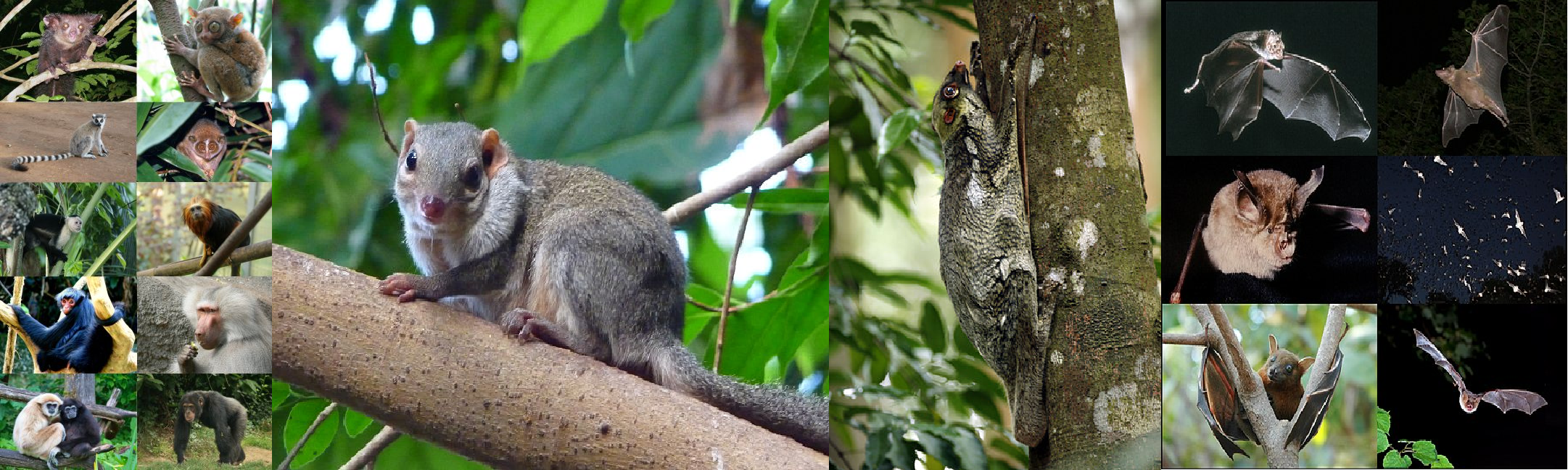

Scientific classification
- Domain: Eukaryota
- Kingdom: Animalia
- Phylum: Chordata
- Class: Mammalia
- Superorder: Tokotheria
- Grandorder: Archonta

Subgroups
- Euarchonta; Chiroptera

= Archonta =

Invalid superorder of mammals

The Archonta are a now-abandoned group of mammals, considered a superorder in some classifications, which consists of these orders:

- Primates
- Plesiadapiformes (extinct primate-like archontans)
- Scandentia (treeshrews)
- Dermoptera (colugos)

While bats were traditionally included in the Archonta, genetic analysis has suggested that bats actually belong in Laurasiatheria. A revised category excluding bats, Euarchonta, has been proposed.

This taxon may have arisen in the Early Cretaceous (more than 100 million years ago), so other models may explain mammalian evolution besides an explosive radiation from a single surviving lineage following the Cretaceous-Paleogene extinction of the Mesozoic megafauna, such as a series of prior radiations related to the breakup of Gondwana and Laurasia allowing for more survivors.
