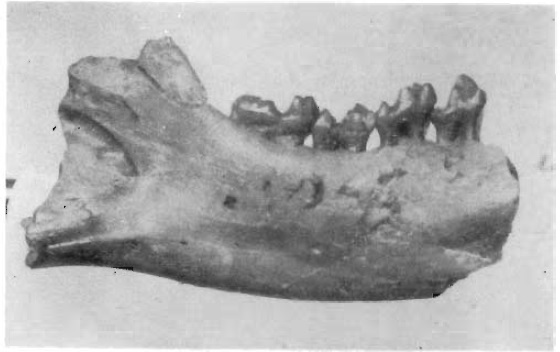
- lower jaw of Altanius orlovi

Scientific classification
- Domain: Eukaryota
- Kingdom: Animalia
- Phylum: Chordata
- Class: Mammalia
- Order: Primates
- (unranked): Euprimates
- (unranked): incertae sedis
- Genus: †Altanius; Dashzeveg and McKenna 1977

Type species
- †Altanius orlovi Dashzeveg and McKenna 1977

= Altanius =

Altanius Temporal range: Early Eocene

Extinct genus of primates

Altanius is a genus of extinct primates found in the early Eocene of Mongolia. Though its phylogenetic relationship is questionable, many have placed it as either a primitive omomyid or as a member of the sister group to both adapoids and omomyids. The genus is represented by one species, Altanius orlovi, estimated to weigh about 10–30 g (0.35–1.1 oz) from relatively well-known and complete dental and facial characteristics.

== Morphology ==
Much of the fossilized remains of Altanius, as with any extinct vertebrate, are isolated teeth fragments. However, an abundance of specimens, collected between Dashzeveg and McKenna's initial discovery of the species in 1977 and the present, have yielded an almost complete dentition.

Identifying dental characteristics of the genus include small, high, trigonids, the anterior basin on lower molars, and high premolars. It is linked with the omomyoid group in its unfused mandible, reduced paraconids on the lower molars, and overall shorter molars. These traits are too numerous to have been easily developed by parallel evolution. In the taxa's four premolars, double rooted second premolar and unreduced canine and last molar, the teeth of Altanius are too primitive to be omomyoids, best resembling the Carpolestidae, a group of Plesiadapiformes. The dentition is also not dissimilar from primitive adapoids Donrusselia and Cantius. However, its high lingual cusps and short talonids, the basin at the distal end of the lower molars, are traits too derived for this specimen to be a primitive omomyoid ancestor.

== Phylogeny ==
Found in 1977, this genus was one of the first Eocene fossil primates to be found in Asia and indicates that early primate radiations were not restricted to North America and Europe. Altanius, with a mixture of dental traits, some incredibly primitive, some very similar to other omomyoids, and some highly specialized, has not been satisfactorily placed in any taxonomic group. Most likely, it is a member sister group that branched off either right before or right after the omomyoid/adapoid split, although there are many other interpretations.
