= Lambertocyon =

Lambertocyon Temporal range: Paleocene

Scientific classification
- Kingdom: Animalia
- Phylum: Chordata
- Class: Mammalia
- Infraclass: Placentalia
- Order: †Arctocyonia
- Family: †Arctocyonidae
- Genus: †Lambertocyon; Gingerich, 1979

Type species
- Lambertocyon eximius Gingerich, 1979

Species
- L. eximius; L. gingerichi; L. ischyrus

Extinct genus of mammals

Lambertocyon is a genus of ungulates from western North America. Three species are known, making their last appearance in the Late Paleocene Clarkforkian stage.
