= Sigynorum =

Sigynorum Temporal range: Danian

Scientific classification
- Kingdom: Animalia
- Phylum: Chordata
- Class: Mammalia
- Order: †Arctocyonia
- Family: †Arctocyonidae
- Genus: †Sigynorum
- Species: †S. magnadivisus

Binomial name
- †Sigynorum magnadivisus McComas & Eberle, 2016

Extinct genus of mammals

Sigynorum is an extinct genus of arctocyonid that lived during the Puercan North American land mammal age.

== Distribution ==
Sigynorum magnadivisus is known from the Fort Union Formation of Wyoming.
