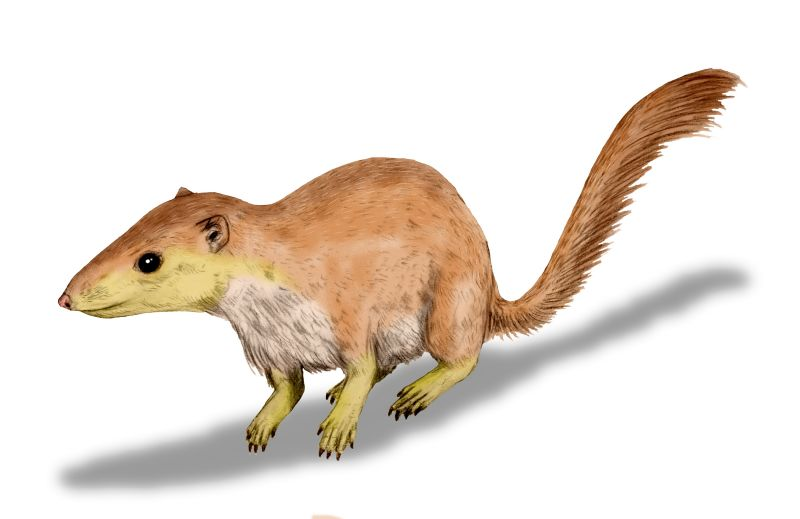
- Life restoration of P. unio

Scientific classification
- Kingdom: Animalia
- Phylum: Chordata
- Class: Mammalia
- Order: †Plesiadapiformes
- Family: †Purgatoriidae
- Genus: †Purgatorius; Valen & Sloan, 1965

Type species
- †Purgatorius unio Valen & Sloan, 1965

Species
- P. ceratops? Van Valen & Sloan, 1965; P. coracis Fox & Scott, 2011; P. janisae Van Valen, 1994; P. mckeeveri Wilson Mantilla et al., 2021; P. pinecreeensis Scott et al., 2016; P. titusi? Buckley, 1997; P. unio Van Valen & Sloan, 1965

= Purgatorius =

Purgatorius Temporal range: Paleocene (Danian), 65.942–63 Ma

Extinct genus of mammals

Purgatorius is an extinct genus of eutherian mammal from the early Paleocene epoch of western North America. It is typically believed to be the earliest example of a primate or protoprimate (a primatomorph precursor to the Plesiadapiformes), dating to nearly as old as 66 million years ago.

The first remains (P. unio and P. ceratops) were reported in 1965, from what is now eastern Montana's Tullock Formation (early Paleocene, Puercan). P. unio is from Purgatory Hill (hence the animal's name) in deposits believed to be about 63 million years old, and P. ceratops is a single worn tooth from Harbicht Hill in the lower Paleocene section of the Hell Creek Formation. Both locations are in McCone County, Montana. Harbicht Hill was once thought to be late Cretaceous, but it is now clear that it represents Paleocene channels with time-averaged fossil assemblages. Several more Montanan Purgatorius species have been named since the initial discovery, though fossils are still limited to teeth, jaw fragments, and a few ankle bones. Two Purgatorius species were also named from the Ravenscrag Formation of Saskatchewan, and an undetermined species is known from Corral Bluffs in Colorado.

Purgatorius is thought to have been rat-sized (6 in (15 cm) long and 1.3 ounces (about 37 grams)) and a diurnal insectivore. In life, it would have resembled a squirrel or a tree shrew (most likely the latter, given that tree shrews are one of the closest living relatives of primates, and Purgatorius is considered to be the progenitor to primates). The oldest remains of Purgatorius date back to 65.946–65.912 million years ago, or between 105 thousand to 139 thousand years after the K-Pg boundary.

== Discovery and species ==
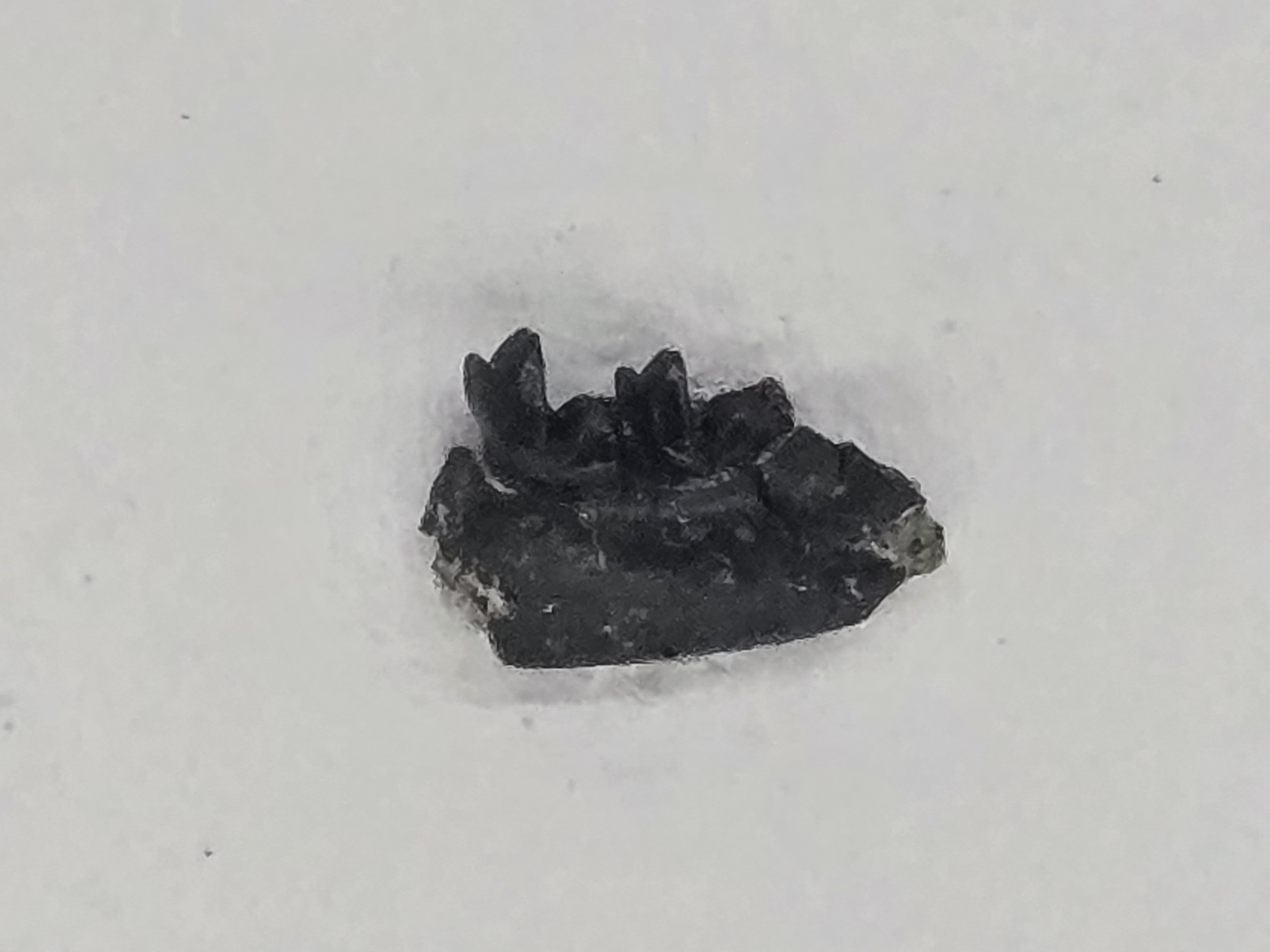
Jaw fragment of an unnamed Purgatorius species from the Willow Creek Formation of Alberta.

Purgatorius contains at least five valid species distributed throughout the early Paleocene of western North America. The southernmost record is from Corral Bluffs in the Denver Basin of Colorado. The Coloradan fossils are from around 550-650 thousand years after the K-Pg boundary, during the Puercan 2 land mammal age.

=== Purgatorius unio ===
P. unio is the type species of Purgatorius, named in a 1965 Science paper by Leigh Van Valen and Robert E. Sloan. It was originally based on just a few teeth from the Purgatory Hill local fauna, in the Tullock Formation (Tullock Member of the Fort Union Formation) of McCone County, Montana. The species name references how its fossils were initially sourced from a layer full of fossils of Unio, a freshwater mussel. Purgatory Hill is from the early Paleocene (Puercan 3 land mammal age).

Buckley (1997) reported over 50 Purgatorius teeth from Simpson Quarry, a site in the Bear Formation of Wheatland County, Montana. Buckley proposed a new species for the Simpson Quarry fossils, P. titusi, but several subsequent studies considered his species a junior synonym of P. unio. The youngest known Purgatorius fossils are teeth similar to P. unio and P. pinecreeensis found at Horsethief Canyon, a site in Garfield County, Montana dated to the Torrejonian 1 age.

=== Purgatorius ceratops ===
Named in 1965 in the same paper as P. unio, P. ceratops is from the Harbicht Hill local fauna in the Hell Creek Formation of McCone County, Montana. It is based on a single lower molar, which is sometimes regarded as undiagnostic. The species name references the dinosaur Triceratops, as it was initially considered to have lived in the Late Cretaceous (Lancian faunal stage) alongside Hell Creek dinosaurs such as Triceratops.

Later studies disputed a Cretaceous age for Harbicht Hill, arguing that the site represents an early Paleocene river which eroded down into Cretaceous sediments, exposing and reworking older dinosaur fossils in the process. Further excavations have yet to reveal any more Purgatorius fossils at Harbicht Hill, and it is possible that P. ceratops is instead a tooth from a eutherian unrelated to Purgatorius.

=== Purgatorius janisae ===
In 1974, William A. Clemens reported Purgatorius fossils from the Garbani Channel site in Garfield County, Montana. Clemens identified the Garbani Channel fossils as P. unio, but Van Valen (1994) gave them a new species, P. janisae. Garbani Channel is from the Puercan 3 land mammal age.

P. janisae has the most complete remains of any Purgatorius species, including numerous teeth, maxilla fragments, and lower jaws. One lower jaw fossil contains three preserved molars, three preserved premolars, and empty sockets for a premolar and canine. Isolated incisors are also known from Garbani Channel, along with Purgatorius ankle bones (astragali and calcanei). Molar teeth of P. janisae have been found at the Harley's Point, a site which is Puercan 1 in age. This would make P. janisae the joint-oldest species of Purgatorius, alongside P. mckeeveri.

=== Purgatorius coracis ===
Purgatorius fossils were first reported from the Ravenscrag Formation of Saskatchewan in 1984, as the first Purgatorius fossils found outside of Montana. These fossils received their own species, P. coracis, in 2011. The species name coracis is Latin for raven, in reference to the Ravenscrag Formation. The mammal fauna at the same site as P. coracis resemble Puercan 2 mammals found further south, though magnetostratigraphy may support an age as old as Puercan 1.

=== Purgatorius pinecreeensis ===
P. pinecreensis is the second Purgatorius species from the Ravenscrag Formation of Saskatchewan. Its teeth have lower, broader cusps and a larger talonid basin than other Purgatorius species, suggesting a greater ability to crush and grind tough food items such as seeds.

=== Purgatorius mckeeveri ===
P. mckeeveri was described in 2021 based on jaw fragments and isolated molar teeth from Harley's Point, a Tullock Member site in Garfield County, Montana. Harley's Point is the oldest site to preserve Purgatorius fossils, from the Puercan 1 land mammal age at the very start of the Paleocene. It dates to at least 65.844 Ma (million years ago), a maximum of 208 thousand years after the asteroid impact which ended the Cretaceous period at 66.052 Ma. Some calibrations place it even closer to the K-Pg boundary, 105–139 thousand years after the impact (65.946–65.912 Ma). P. mckeeveri also occurs at Garbani Channel. The species name mckeeveri honors Frank McKeever, a Garfield County resident who assisted fieldwork in the 1960s, as well as the McKeever family who more recently supported excavations at Harley's Point.

== Description of remains ==
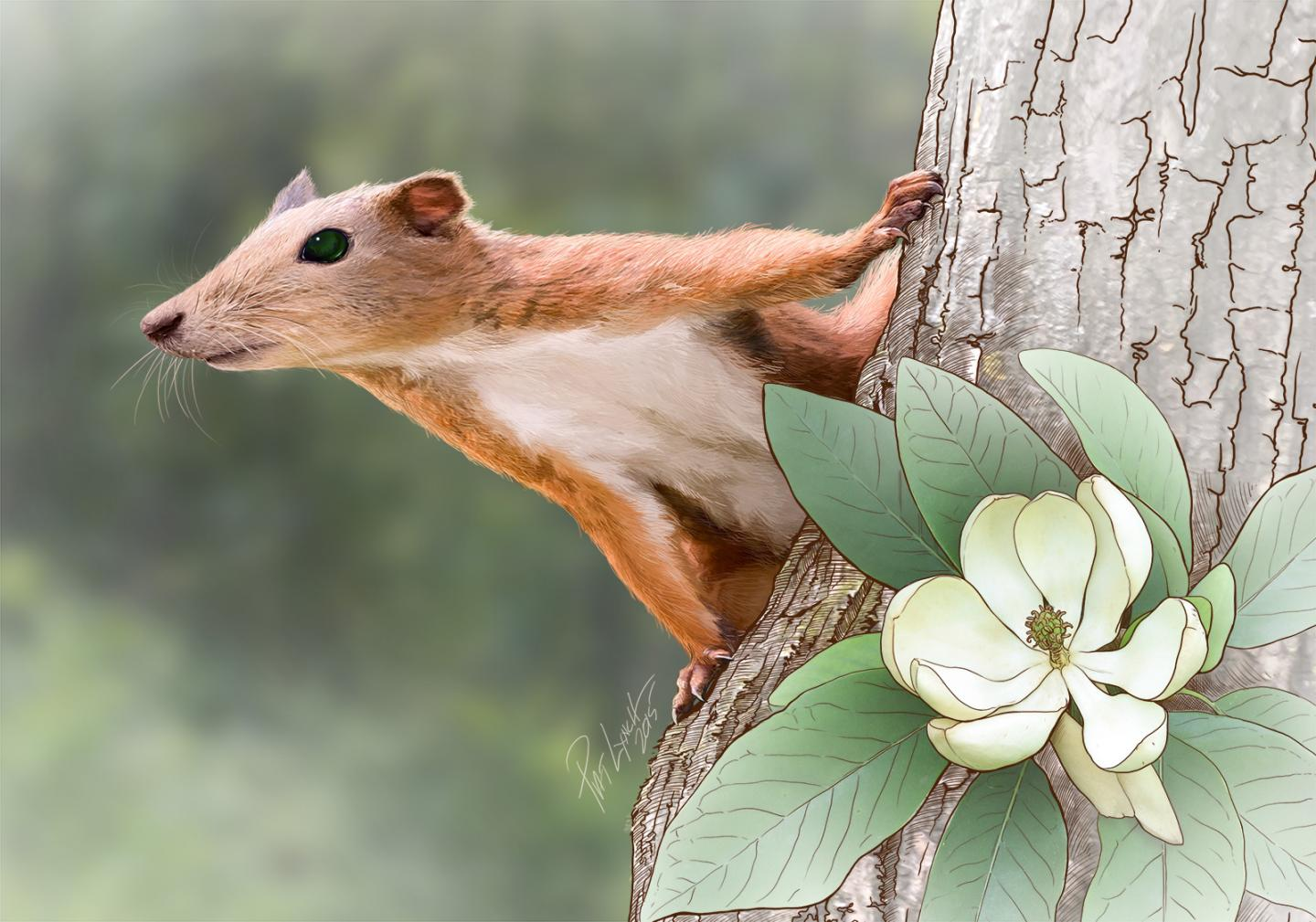
A life restoration of Purgatorius on a magnolia tree.

Postcanine dentition of P. unio is documented by 13 dentulous, fragmentary mandibles, a fragmentary maxillary and more than 50 isolated teeth from Garbani Locality 80 km west of Purgatory Hill. P. ceratops is represented by an isolated lower molar found at Harbicht Hill, McCone County. The report of the occurrence of Purgatorius in the Late Cretaceous was based on an isolated, worn molar found in a channel filling that contains early Puercan fossils. It is also abundantly represented in Pu 2-3 local faunas in the northwestern interior, suggesting that it came into the area between 64.75 and 64.11 Mya. Fragmentary dentition from the Garbani Channel fauna from Purgatorius janisae shows that the lower dental formula was 3.1.4.3.

=== Dentition ===
The type specimen of P. unio, a damaged upper molar, is essentially identical to teeth found at the Garbani Locality. Data from this sample support Van Valen and Sloan's identification of topotypic lower molars, and also demonstrate that the lower dentition of P. unio includes seven postcanines. The alveolus for the single root of P1, crown unknown, is smaller than those for the canine or P2. The second lower pre- molar is smaller than P3; both are two- rooted. The fourth lower premolar is submolariform. A metaconid is lacking, although on some teeth slight thickenings of the enamel are present in this region. Talonid cusps are slightly differentiated. The first and second lower molars are approximately the same length (M1, average length x=- 1.93 mm, N- 13; M2, x=2.00 mm, N- 9); M. is longer (x= 2.32 mm, N -7). Widths of talonids of M1.2 vary from less than to greater than widths of trigonids. Hypoconulid of M. is enlarged, salient, and on some teeth incipiently doubled by addition of a lingual cusp.

The proximate cause of the tall protocone found in Purgatorius may have been a lingual bias in activator expression during the bud stage of dental development, which would have stablished a buccolingual growth axis.

=== Ankle bones ===
Bones from the ankle are similar to those of primates, and were suited for a life up in trees.

== Classification ==
For many years, there has been debate as to whether Purgatorius is a primitive member of the primates or a basal member of the Plesiadapiforms. Several characters of the dentition of Purgatorius, which includes its incisor morphology, can ally it with later plesiadapiforms. The prism cross sections are highly variable with circular, horseshoe and irregular shapes, while the prisms of cheek teeth are radially arranged. Due to the fragmentary dentaries found in the Garbani Channel fauna from Purgatorius janisae the morphology of the canine and incisor alveoli suggest the derived gradient in the crown size of: I1>or = I2>I3<C. Isolated upper incisors referable from P. janisae exhibit some typical plesiadapiform specializations. Due to general morphology of the postcanine dentition of Purgatorius, it could be expected to be characterized as a primitive member of the primates. However, due to the specializations of its incisors of P. janisae it is considered by some investigators as a basal member of the Pleasiadapiformes sensu lato.

A phylogenetic analysis of 177 mammal taxa (mostly Cretaceous and Palaeocene fossils), published in 2015, suggests that Purgatorius may not be closely related to primates at all, but instead falls outside crown-group placentals – specifically as the sister taxon to Protungulatum. Similar results had been obtained in previous studies with far fewer species.
