= Sundatheria =

Sundatherians

Scientific classification
- Domain: Eukaryota
- Kingdom: Animalia
- Phylum: Chordata
- Class: Mammalia
- Grandorder: Euarchonta
- (unranked): Sundatheria

Subgroups
- †Plagiomenidae; Scandentia; Dermoptera?

Clade of mammals

Sundatheria is a proposed clade of placental mammals. It includes the orders Scandentia and Dermoptera. An alternative phylogeny is the Primatomorpha hypothesis.
