= Niptomomys =

Niptomomys Temporal range: Palaeocene–Eocene

Scientific classification
- Kingdom: Animalia
- Phylum: Chordata
- Class: Mammalia
- Order: Plesiadapiformes
- Genus: †Niptomomys; McKenna, 1960

Extinct genus of mammals

Niptomomys is an extinct genus of plesiadapiform that lived in North America during the Palaeocene and Eocene epochs.

== Description ==
Niptomomys cf. Niptomomys doreenae had large petrosal lobules.
