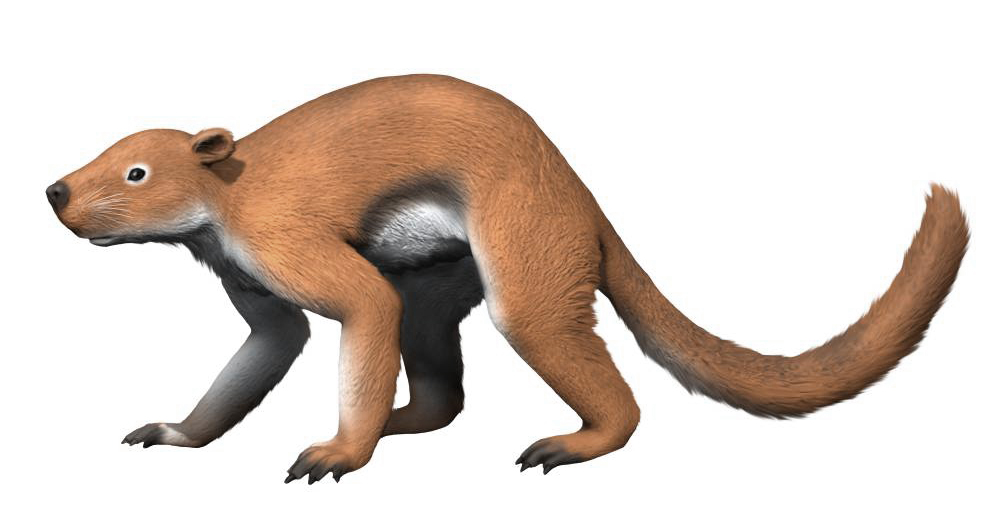
- Life restoration of Plesiadapis

Scientific classification
- Kingdom: Animalia
- Phylum: Chordata
- Class: Mammalia
- Order: †Plesiadapiformes
- Superfamily: †Plesiadapoidea

Families
- †Carpolestidae; †Picrodontidae; †Plesiadapidae; †Saxonellidae

= Plesiadapoidea =

Plesiadapoidea Temporal range: 63.3–40.4 Ma

Extinct superfamily of mammals

Plesiadapoidea was an extinct superfamily of primates that existed during the Paleocene and Eocene in North America, Europe, and Asia.
