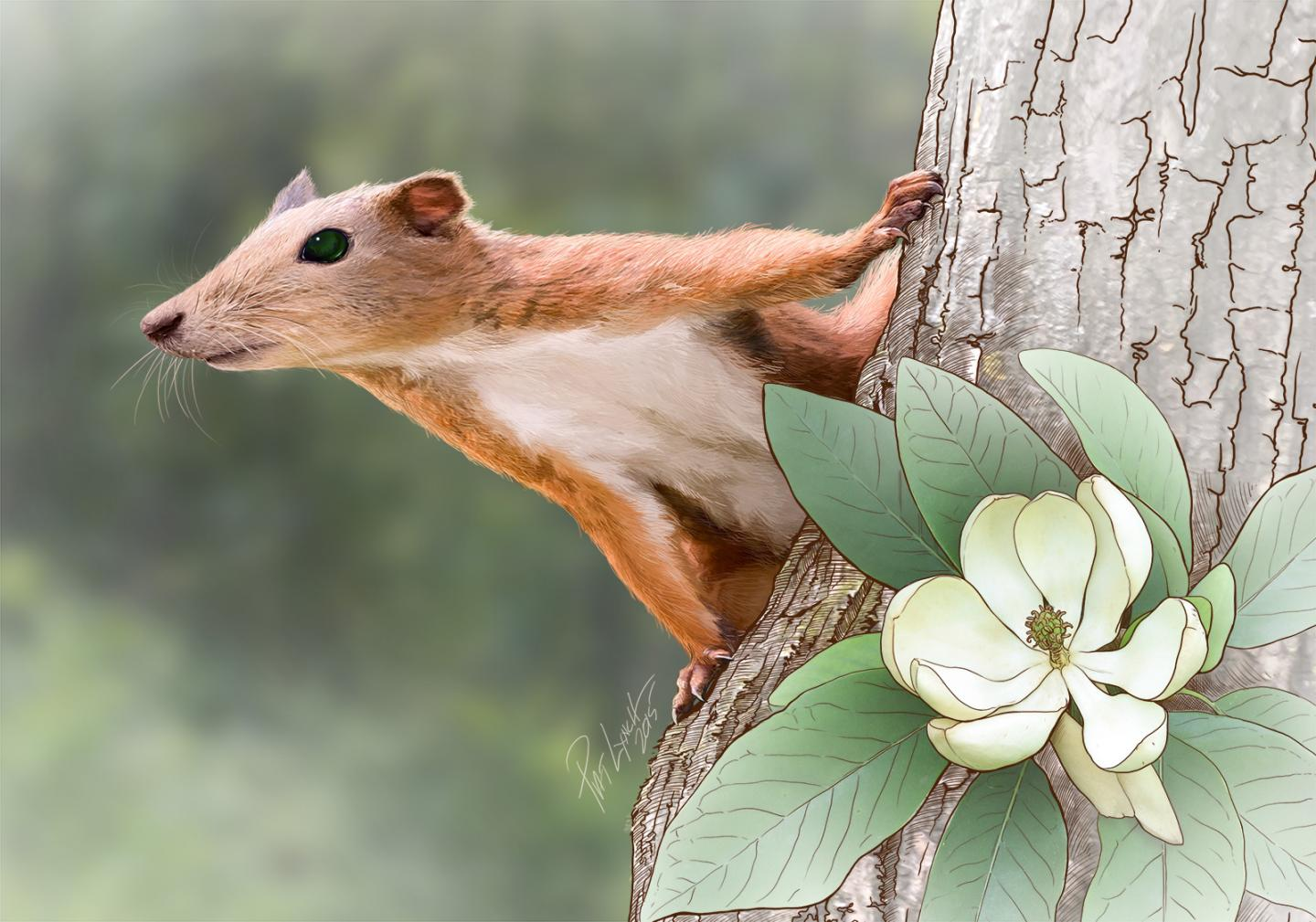
- Life restoration of Purgatorius

Scientific classification
- Kingdom: Animalia
- Phylum: Chordata
- Class: Mammalia
- Order: †Plesiadapiformes
- Family: †Purgatoriidae; Gunnell, 1989

Genera
- †Purgatorius; †Ursolestes

= Purgatoriidae =

Purgatoriidae Temporal range: Paleocene

Extinct family of mammals

Purgatoriidae is a basal plesiadapiform family that includes Purgatorius and Ursolestes. Purgatoriids are thought to represent the earliest members of the Plesiadapiformes – as well as primates.
