= Polecat Bench Formation =

Geologic formation in Montana, United States

- Stratigraphic range: Thanetian-Ypresian (Late Paleocene-Early Eocene), ~58–55 Ma
- Type: Formation
- Unit of: Fort Union Formation

Location
- Region: Montana, Wyoming
- Country: United States

The Polecat Bench Formation is a geologic formation in Montana. It preserves fossils dating back to the Paleogene period. The polyglyphanodontian lizard Chamops is known from this formation.

== See also ==
- List of fossiliferous stratigraphic units in Montana
- Paleontology in Montana
