= Arctostylopidae =

Arctostylopidae Temporal range: Late Paleocene-Late Eocene

Scientific classification
- Kingdom: Animalia
- Phylum: Chordata
- Class: Mammalia
- Infraclass: Placentalia
- Clade: Gliriformes (?)
- Order: †Arctostylopida; Cifelli et al., 1989
- Family: †Arctostylopidae; Schlosser, 1923

Genera
- †Allostylops; †Anatolostylops; †Arctostylops; †Asiostylops; †Bothriostylops; †Enantiostylops; †Kazachostylops; †Migrostylops; †Palaeostylops; †Sinostylops; †Stenostylops; †Wanostylops

Extinct family of mammals

Arctostylopidae is an extinct family of placental mammals from the Late Palaeocene of Eastern Asia and North America. All arctostylopid specimens in North America have been referred to the genus Arctostylops.

They are animals of uncertain affinities to other groups and it was believed that they may be related to 'ungulates'. Originally they were considered to be northern relatives of South American notoungulates, specifically Notostylopidae.

Recently, other palaeontologists have suggested that they might be descendants of Asian gliriforms, and therefore related to rabbits and rodents. This relationship is based upon similarities in the shape of their tarsal (ankle) bones. In particular, arctostylopid tarsals bear a strong resemblance to the early gliroid Rhombomylus.
