= Berru =

- Commune
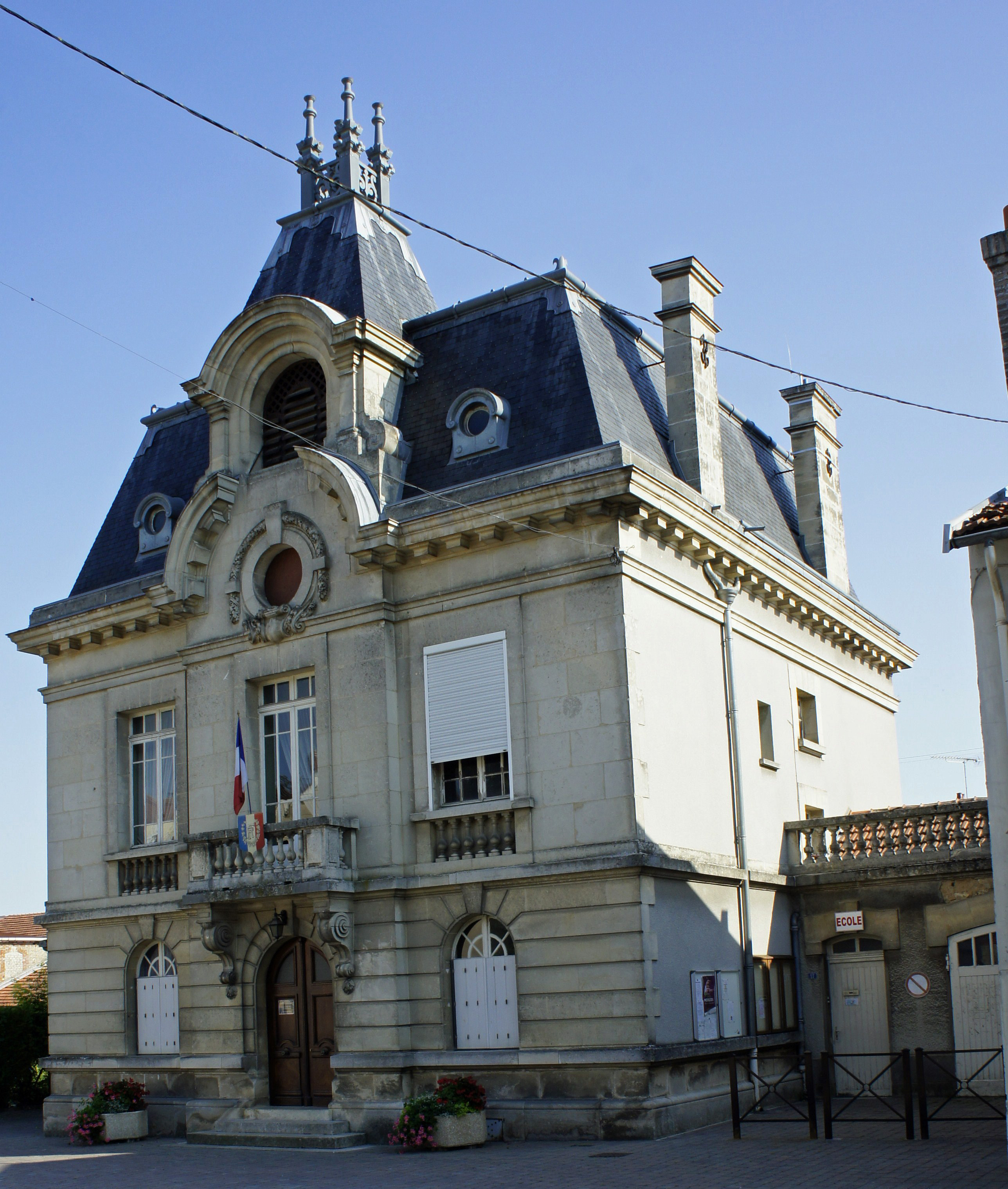
- The town hall in Berru
- Location of Berru
- Location within France Location within Grand Est
- Coordinates: 49°16′21″N 4°09′09″E
- Country: France
- Region: Grand Est
- Department: Marne
- Arrondissement: Reims
- Canton: Bourgogne-Fresne
- Intercommunality: CU Grand Reims

Government
  - Mayor (2020–2026): Marie-Hélène Bastogne
- Area^{1}: 13.65 km^{2} (5.27 sq mi)
- Elevation: 275 m (902 ft)
- Population (2023): 627
  - Density: 45.9/km^{2} (119/sq mi)
- Time zone: UTC+01:00 (CET)
  - Summer (DST): UTC+02:00 (CEST)
- INSEE/Postal code: 51052 /51420
- ^{1} French Land Register data, which excludes lakes, ponds, glaciers > 1 km^{2} (0.386 sq mi or 247 acres) and river estuaries.

Berru (French pronunciation: [beʁy]) is a commune in the Marne department in northeastern France.

Berru, along with the neighboring commune of Cernay-lès-Reims, is the site of a geologic formation (part of the Paris Basin) that has yielded a significant number of Paleocene-strata fossils.

== Population ==
Historical population
Year	Pop.	±% p.a.
1968	287	—
1975	296	+0.44%
1982	320	+1.12%
1990	459	+4.61%
1999	454	−0.12%
2007	503	+1.29%
2012	498	−0.20%
2017	574	+2.88%
2023	627	+1.48%
Source: INSEE

== See also ==
- Communes of the Marne department
