= Micromomyidae =

Micromomyidae Temporal range: 56.8–50.3 Ma

Scientific classification
- Kingdom: Animalia
- Phylum: Chordata
- Class: Mammalia
- Order: †Plesiadapiformes
- Family: †Micromomyidae; Szalay, 1974

Genera
- Chalicomomys; Dryomomys; Foxomomys; Micromomys; Tinimomys

Extinct family of mammals

Micromomyidae (Micromomids) is a family of extinct plesiadapiform mammals that include some of the earliest known primates. The family includes five genera that lived from the Paleocene epoch into the early Eocene epoch.

Micromomyids first appeared in the fossil record between 61.7 and 56.8 million years ago with the Micromomys genus. All but one specimen has been discovered in modern-day inland North America, more specifically in Wyoming, Alberta, and Saskatchewan, with one unlabeled Eocene species found in Shandong, China.

Like other known Plesiadapiformes, it appears that the micromomyids were small, tree-dwelling insectivores. They are thought to be some of the smallest of their order, with estimates of mass for some species around 10 to 40 grams or 0.35 to 1.41 ounces..
