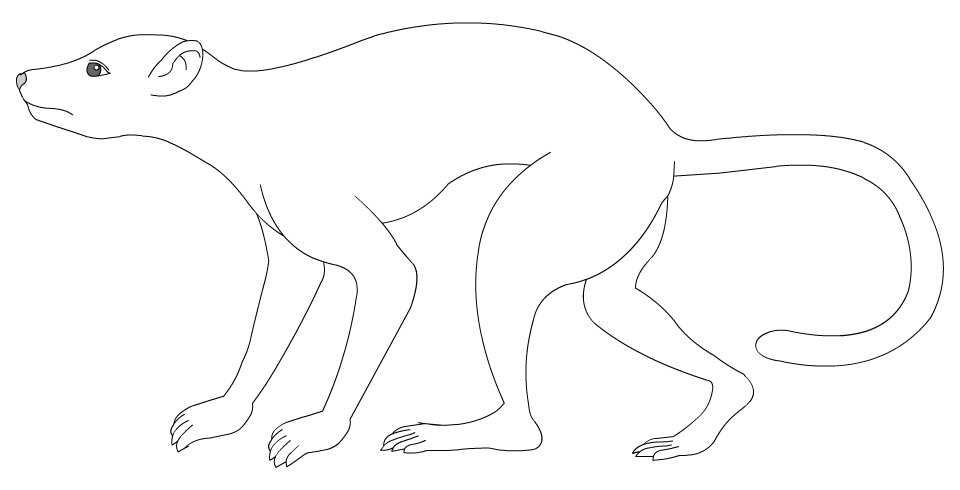
- Plesiadapis

Scientific classification
- Kingdom: Animalia
- Phylum: Chordata
- Class: Mammalia
- Order: †Plesiadapiformes
- Superfamily: †Plesiadapoidea
- Family: †Plesiadapidae; Trouessart, 1897

Genera
- †Pronothodectes †Chiromyoides †Nannodectes †Plesiadapis †Platychoerops †Jattadectes

Synonyms
- Plesiadapinae Trouessart, 1897

= Plesiadapidae =

Plesiadapidae Temporal range: early Paleocene - early Eocene

Family of mammals

Plesiadapidae is a family of plesiadapiform mammals related to primates known from the Paleocene and Eocene of North America, Europe, and Asia. Plesiadapids were abundant in the late Paleocene, and their fossils are often used to establish the ages of fossil faunas.

== Classification ==
McKenna and Bell recognized two subfamilies (Plesiadapinae and Saxonellinae) and one unassigned genus (Pandemonium) within Plesiadapidae. More recently Saxonella (the only saxonelline) and Pandemonium have been excluded from the family, leaving only a redundant Plesiadapinae. Within the family, Pronothodectes is the likely ancestor of all other genera, while Plesiadapis may be directly ancestral to both Chiromyoides and Platychoerops.
