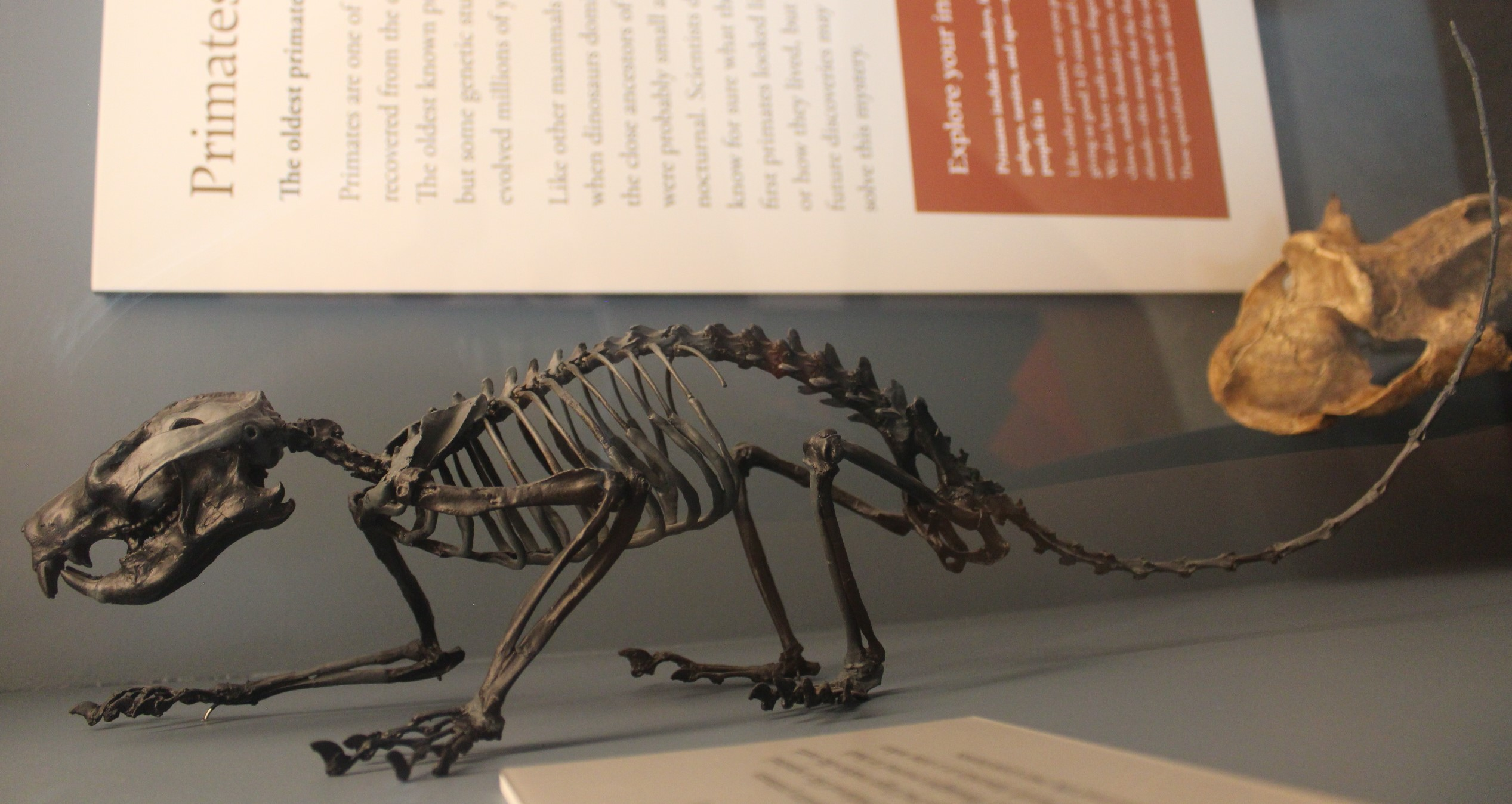
- Reconstructed skeleton of P. cookei at the University of Michigan Museum of Natural History

Scientific classification
- Kingdom: Animalia
- Phylum: Chordata
- Class: Mammalia
- Order: †Plesiadapiformes
- Family: †Plesiadapidae
- Genus: †Plesiadapis; Gervais, 1877

Type species
- †Plesiadapis tricuspidens Gervais, 1877

Other species
- See text

= Plesiadapis =

Plesiadapis Temporal range: Selandian–Ypresian

Extinct genus of mammals

Plesiadapis (near Adapis) is an extinct genus of mammal closely related to primates, which lived in North America and western Europe during the Paleogene period (Selandian-Ypresian). The type species, P. tricuspidens, was described in 1877 by François Louis Paul Gervais, based on a partial left mandible (lower jaw) uncovered in France. Fourteen valid species have since been named.

== Taxonomy ==
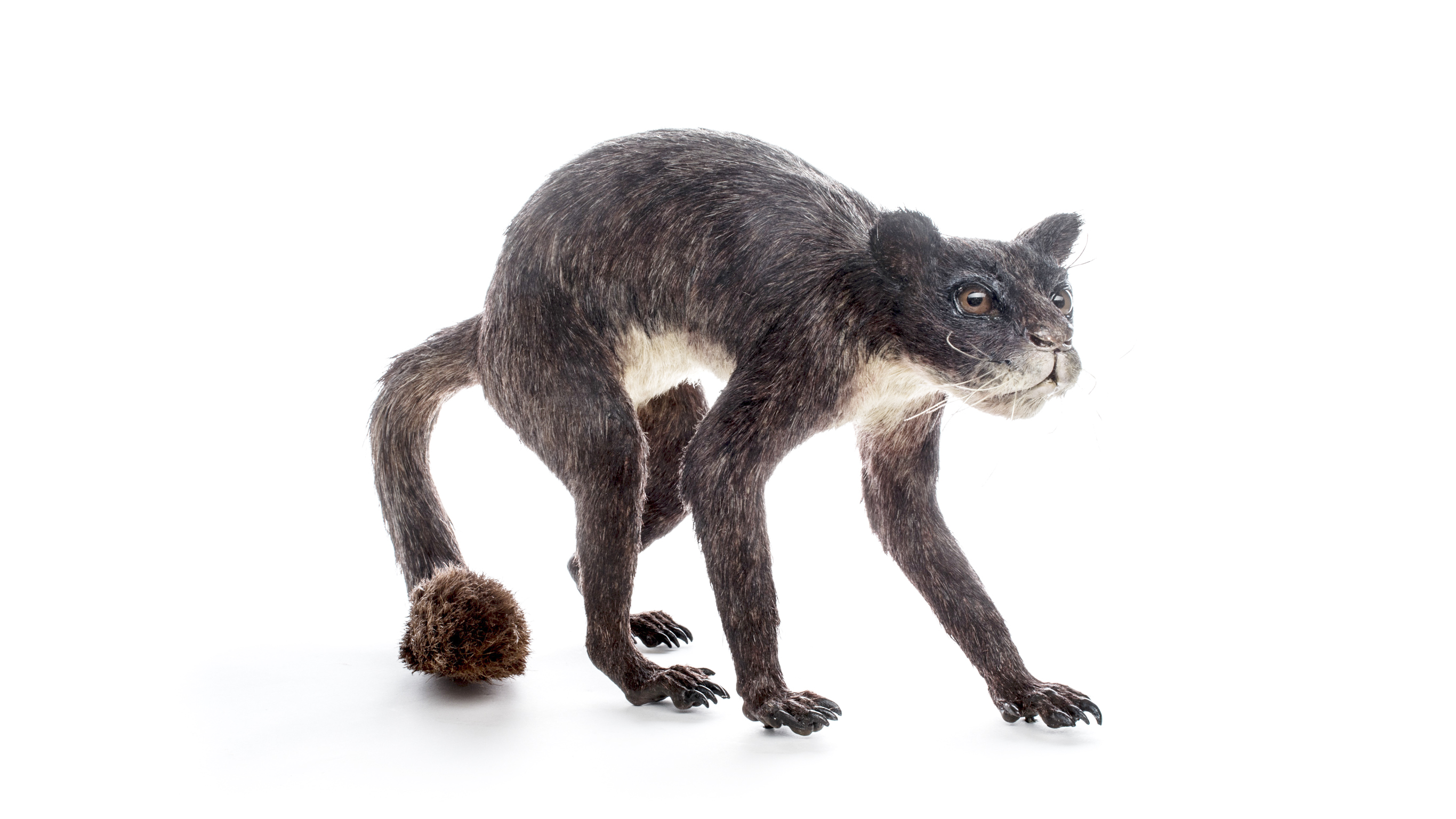
Life restoration at MUSE - Science Museum in Trento

The first discovery of Plesiadapis was made by François Louis Paul Gervais in 1877, who first discovered Plesiadapis tricuspidens in France. The type specimen is MNHN Crl-16, and is a left mandibular fragment dated to the early Eocene epoch.

This genus probably arose in North America and colonized Europe on a land bridge via Greenland. Thanks to the abundance of the genus and to its rapid evolution, species of Plesiadapis play an important role in the zonation of Late Paleocene continental sediments and in the correlation of faunas on both sides of the Atlantic. Two remarkable skeletons of Plesiadapis, one of them nearly complete, have been found in lake deposits at Menat, France. Although the preservation of the hard parts is poor, these skeletons still show remains of skin and hair as a carbonaceous film, something unique among Paleocene mammals. Details of the bones are better preserved in fossils from Cernay, also in France, where Plesiadapis is one of the most common mammals.

=== Classification ===
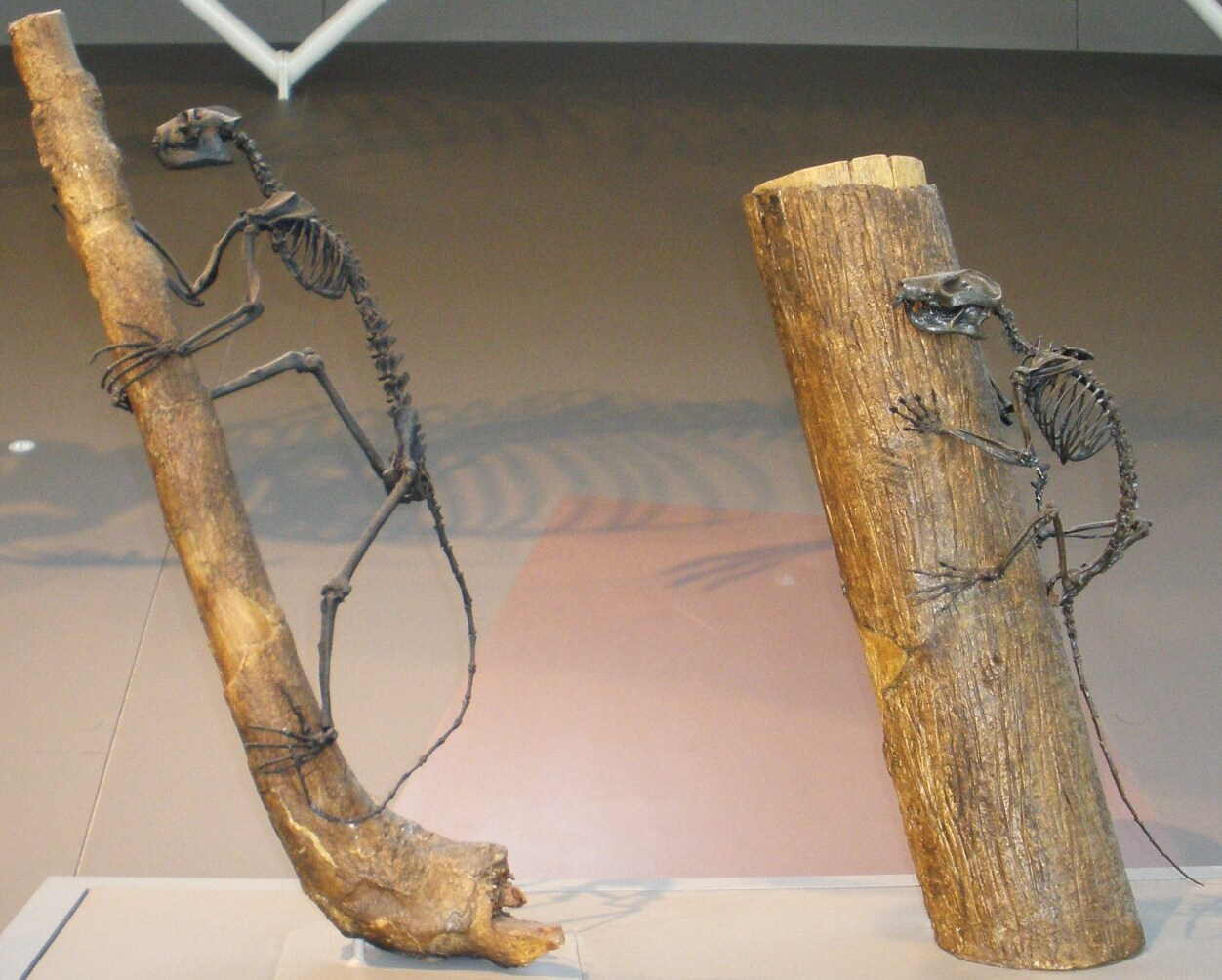
P. cookei compared to Notharctus tenebrosus (left), an early true primate. Both come from Eocene Wyoming, though the latter is slightly geologically younger.

The following are possible shared derived features of Plesiadapiformes: maxillary-frontal contact in orbit, the presence of a suboptic foramen, an ossified external auditory meatus, the absence of a promontory artery, the absence of a stapedial artery, and a strong mastoid tubercle.

Although the placement of the Plesiadapis lineage is still up for debate, the consensus in the 1970s was that they were closest to early tarsier-like primates. Plesiadapiformes have also been proposed as a nonprimate sister group to Eocene-Recent primates. A study done in 1987 linked Plesiadapiformes with adapids and omomyids through nine shared-derived features, six of which are cranial or dental: (1) auditory bulla inflated and formed by the petrosal bone, (2) ectotympanic expanded laterally and fused medially to the wall of the bulla, (3) promontorium centrally positioned in the bulla, and large hypotympanic sinus widely separating promontorium from the basisphenoid, (4) internal carotid entering the bulla posteriolaterally and enclosed in a bony tube, (5) nannopithex fold on the upper molars, and (6) loss of one pair of incisors.

In 2013, a phylogenetic analysis that includes also the basal primate Archicebus positions Plesiadapis firmly outside of the Primates, as a sister group to both Primates and Dermoptera.

=== Species ===
Fifteen species of Plesiadapis recognised by Fredrick S. Szalay and Eric Delson in 1979. The following table is based on that work:

Species	Synonyms	Localities
P. anceps Simpson, 1936	P. jepseni Gazin, 1956; P. praecursor Gingerich, 1974	Tongue River, North Dakota; Douglas Quarry, Montana; Keefer Hill, Wyoming; Scarritt Quarry, Montana; Saddle, Wyoming; Highway blowout, Montana
P. churchilli Gingerich, 1974	P. farisi Krishtalka, 1975	Croc Tooth Quarry, Wyoming; Airport, Wyoming; Long Draw Quarry, Montana; Badwater, California; Sand Draw, Wyoming
P. cookei Jepsen, 1930		Little Sand Coulee Area, Wyoming; Paint Creek, Wyoming; Red Creek, Wyoming; Susan, Wyoming; Verland's, Wyoming
P. dubius Matthew, 1915	No. dubius Matthew, 1915; P. pearcei Gazin, 1956	Paint Creek, Wyoming; Plateau Valley, Colorado; Bearcreek, Montana; Togwotee, Wyoming; Chappo, Wyoming; Clark Fork, Wyoming
P. intermedius Gazin, 1971	Pronothodectes matthewi Gazin, 1956; Pr. simpsoni Gazin, 1956; Nannodectes intermedius Gingerich, 1974; Na. gazini Gingerich, 1974	Douglas Quarry, Montana; Little Muddy Creek, Montana; Keefer Hill, Wyoming; Saddle, Wyoming
P. fodinatus Jepsen, 1930	P. rubeyi Gazin, 1942; P. farisi Dorr, 1952; P. jepseni Gazin, 1956	Princeton Quarry, Wyoming; Schaff Quarry, Wyoming; Ravenscrag, Saskatchewan; Titanoides, Wyoming; Fossil Hollow, Wyoming; Chappo, Wyoming; Dell Creek Quarry, Wyoming
P. gidleyi Matthew, 1917	Nothodectes gidleyi Matthew, 1917; P. tricuspidens Teilhard, 1922; Na. gidleyi Gingerich, 1974	Mason Pocket, Colorado; Joe's Bone Bed, Texas; Black Peaks, Texas
P. insignis Piton, 1940	Sciurus feignouxi Launay, 1908; Menatotherium insigne Piton, 1940	Menat, France
P. remensis Lemoine, 1887		Cernay, France; Lentille, France; Berru, France
P. rex Gidley, 1923	Tetonius rex Gidley, 1923; No. gidleyi Simpson, 1927; P. paskapooensis Russel, 1964	Melville, Montana; Ledge, Wyoming; Cedar Point, Wyoming; Battle Mountain, Montana; Chappo, Wyoming; Erikson's Landing, Alberta; Love Quarry, Wyoming; Twin Creek, Wyoming; West End, Wyoming
P. russelli Gingerich, 1974	P. daubrei Teilhard, 1922; Platychoerops daubrei Russell, 1967	Meudon, France
P. simonsi Gingerich, 1974		Sand Draw, Wyoming
P. simpsoni Gazin, 1956	Pr. simpsoni Gazin, 1956; P. jepseni Gazin, 1956; Na. simpsoni Gingerich, 1974	Ledge, Wyoming; West End, Wyoming
P. tricuspidens (type species); Gervais, 1877	P. gervaisi Lemoin, 1887; P. rhemensis Rütmeyer, 1891; P. remensis Stehlin, 1916; P. trouessarti Schlosser, 1921	Cernay, France; Lentille, France; Berru, France; Rilly, France
P. walbeckensis Russel, 1964		Walbeck, Germany

== Description ==
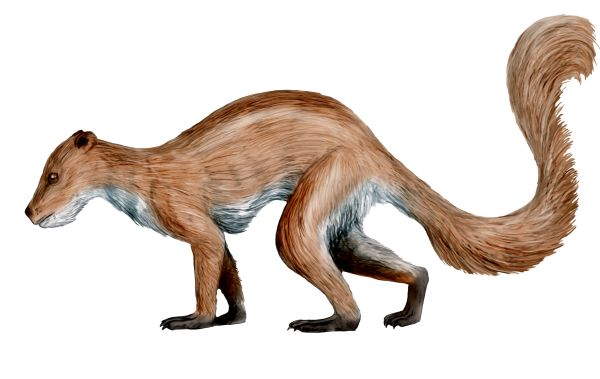
Restoration

Plesiadapis is one of the most completely known early primatomorphs, with a significant amount of the skeleton known, unlike most other plesiadapids which are quite fragmentary. In 1988, John Fleagle estimated its body mass at about 2.1 kg (4.6 lb). In 2006, Philip D. Gingerich and Gregg F. Gunnel estimated the body mass of P. cookei at around 2.176 kg (4.80 lb), though recovered ranges from 1.845–3.621 kg (4.07–7.98 lb) depending on the methodology used. For example, an estimate of 3.067 kg (6.76 lb) based on ratios between tooth weight and body size in modern primates, and regression of body weight versus skull length, using a dataset of insectivorous mammals, yielded a mass of 2.299 kg (5.07 lb). In 2014, Maeva J Orliac and colleagues estimated the body mass of P. tricuspidens at 2.039 kg (4.50 lb) and estimated P. cookei's mass at 2.2 kg (4.9 lb).

=== Skull ===
The skull of Plesiadapis is relatively broad and flat, with a long snout with rodent-like jaws and teeth and long, gnawing incisors separated by a gap from its molars. Orbits are still directed to the side, unlike the forward-facing eyeballs of modern primates that enable three-dimensional vision. The skull is reminiscent of a lemur's, though it lacks the postorbital bars (vertical bars bordering the posterior, or rear, margin of the eye socket). Plesiadapis' brain was very small, around one-quarter the size expected for a mammal of its size.

==== Dentition ====
Plesiadapis' dentition shows a functional shift toward grinding and crushing in the cheek teeth as an adaptation towards increasing omnivory and herbivory. The dental formula is usually 2.1.3.31.1.3.3, with two incisors, one canine, three premolars, and three molars in either half of the upper jaw; and one incisor, one canine, three premolars, and one molar in either half of the lower jaw. The incisors are quite long. Already, Plesiadapis had lost the first premolar from the mammalian common ancestor, but later primatomorphs would lose the second premolar as well. P. dubius consistently lacks the lower second premolar, and about half of P. rex specimens lack it too. P. gidleyi and European Plesiadapis lack the lower canines.

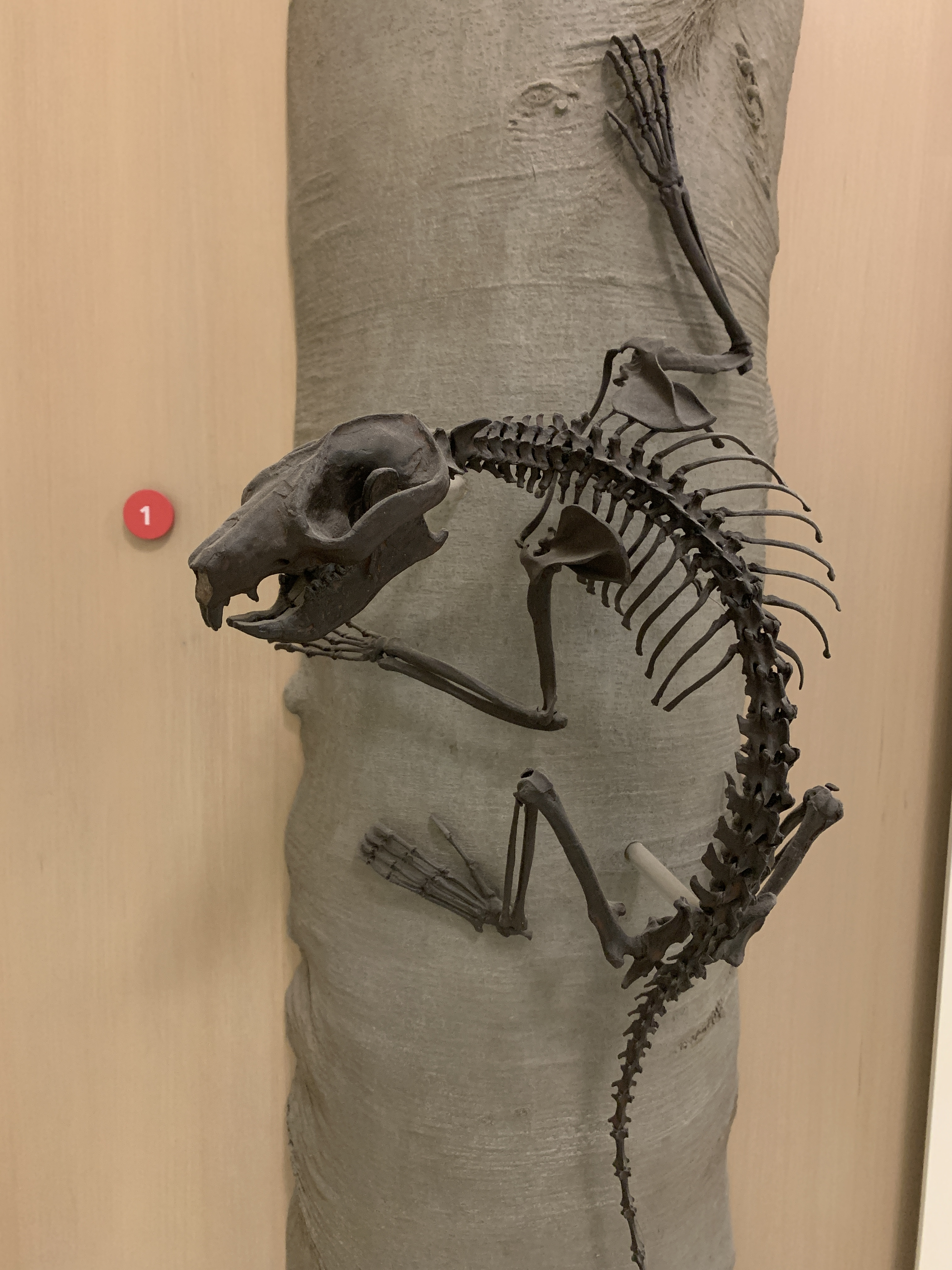
P. cookei cast of a specimen from Wyoming. At the AMNH.

=== Skeleton ===
The skeletal adaptations are consistent with a largely arboreal lifestyle in the trees. The sacrum of P. gidleyi is similar to that of the eastern gray squirrel, though lacking the strong spines. The humerus is robust and features a strong S-curve. Plesiadapis had mobile limbs that terminated in strongly curved claws, and it sported a long bushy tail which is preserved in the Menat skeletons. The way of life of Plesiadapis has been much debated in the past. Climbing habits could be expected in a relative of the primates, but tree-dwelling animals are rarely found in such high numbers. Based on this and other evidence, some paleontologists have concluded that these animals were mainly living on the ground, like today's marmots and ground squirrels. However, more recent investigations have confirmed that the skeleton of Plesiadapis is that of an adept climber, which can be best compared to tree squirrels or to tree-dwelling marsupials such as possums. The short, robust limbs, the long, laterally compressed claws, and the long, bushy tail indicate that it was an arboreal quadruped.

== Palaeoecology ==
Remains belonging to Plesiadapis have been discovered in the Rocky Mountains region of North America and parts of western Europe. The teeth of P. russelli and P. cookei indicate these species were adapted to eat leaves. Large Plesiadapis species in Europe evolved to become increasingly adapted for folivory across the Palaeocene–Eocene boundary, although they were not as adapted for a folivorous diet as Platychoerops daubrei.
