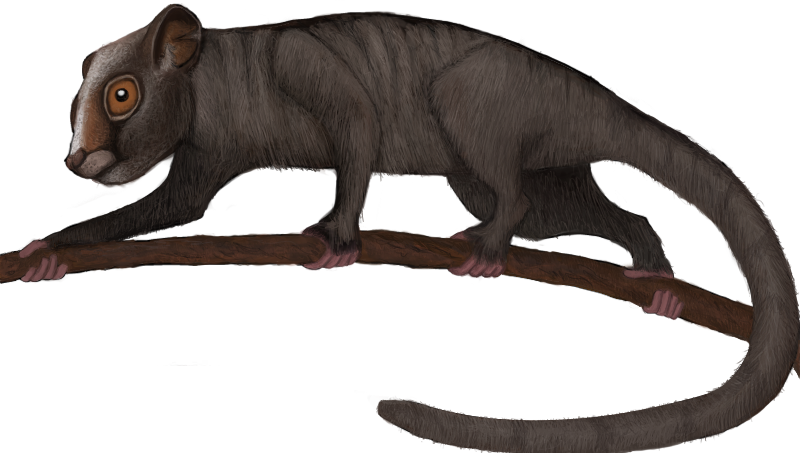
- Carpolestes simpsoni

Scientific classification
- Kingdom: Animalia
- Phylum: Chordata
- Class: Mammalia
- Order: †Plesiadapiformes
- Family: †Carpolestidae; Simpson, 1935

Genera
- †Parvocristes †Elphidotarsius †Carpodaptes †Carpolestes †Carpomegodon

= Carpolestidae =

Carpolestids Temporal range: Middle Paleocene - Early Eocene

Extinct family of mammals

Carpolestidae is a family of primate-like Plesiadapiformes that were prevalent in North America and Asia from the mid Paleocene through the early Eocene. Typically, they are characterized by two large upper posterior premolars and one large lower posterior premolar. They weighed about 20 to 150 grams or 0.7 to 5.3 ounces, and were about the size of a mouse. Though they come from the order, Plesiadapiformes, that may have given rise to the primate order, carpolestids are too specialized and derived to be ancestors of primates.

Historically, the almost twenty species included within the family were thought to have given rise to each other over time in a linear and straightforward manner. Still today it is widely assumed that Elphidotarsius from the mid to late Paleocene gave rise to Carpodaptes which lived in the late Paleocene and subsequently gave rise to Carpolestes from the early Eocene. As a result, they have been used as biostratigraphic indicators in a variety of paleontological digs. However, the phylogenetic picture has been complicated by the discovery in Asia of both ancestral and derived carpolestids in the same stratigraphic layer.
