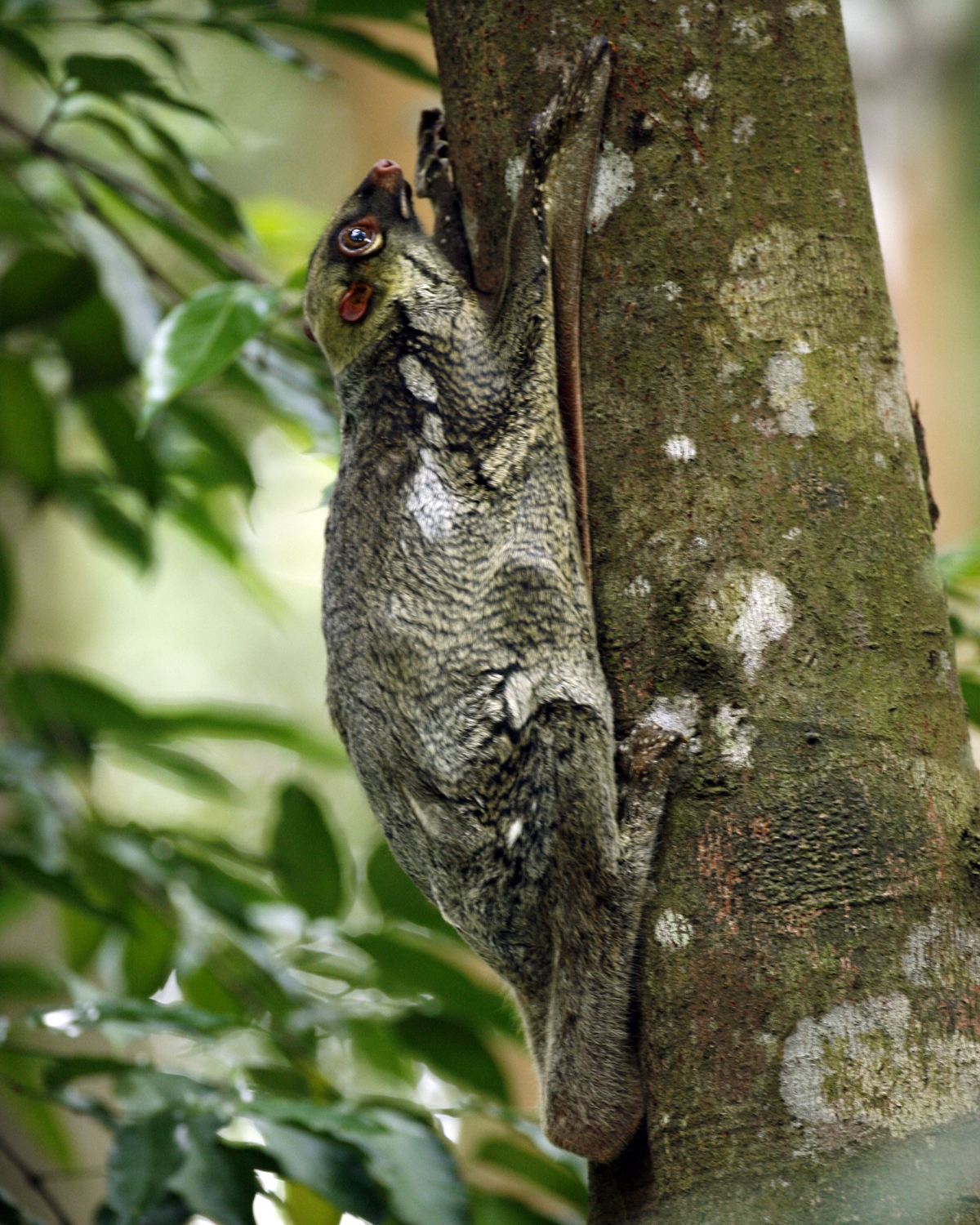

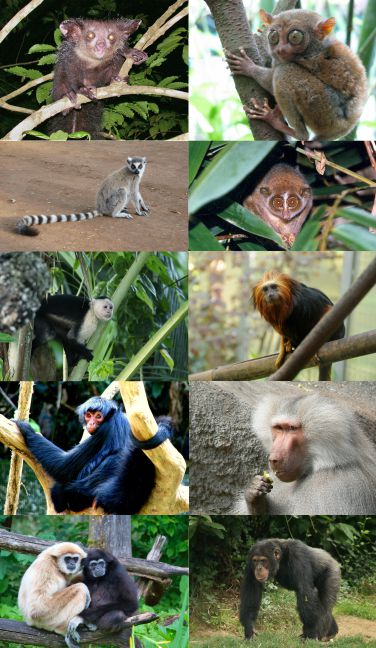

Scientific classification
- Kingdom: Animalia
- Phylum: Chordata
- Class: Mammalia
- Infraclass: Placentalia
- Magnorder: Boreoeutheria
- Superorder: Euarchontoglires
- Grandorder: Euarchonta
- Mirorder: Primatomorpha; Beard, 1991

Orders
- Dermoptera; Pan-Primates; Plesiadapiformes (incl. crown-primates)

= Primatomorpha =

Primatomorpha Temporal range: Paleocene–Holocene, 66–0 Ma

Mirorder of mammals

Primatomorpha is a proposed mirorder of mammals containing the orders Dermoptera (or colugos) and Primates. Primatomorpha is sister to Scandentia, together forming the Euarchonta.

== Terminology ==
The term "Primatomorpha" first appeared in the general scientific literature in 1991 (K.C. Beard) and 1992 (Kalandadze, Rautian). Major DNA sequence analyses of predominantly nuclear sequences support the Euarchonta hypothesis, while a major study investigating mitochondrial sequences supports a different tree topology. A study investigating retrotransposon presence/absence data has claimed strong support for Euarchonta. Some interpretations of the molecular data link Primates and Dermoptera in a clade (mirorder) known as Primatomorpha, which is the sister of Scandentia. Primates probably split from the Dermoptera sister group 79.6 million years ago during the Cretaceous.

== Other interpretations ==
Other interpretations link the Dermoptera and Scandentia together in a group called Sundatheria as the sister group of the primates. Some studies place Scandentia as sister of the Glires, invalidating Euarchonta.

== Taxonomy ==
- Euarchontoglires
  - Glires
    - Lagomorpha
    - Rodentia
  - Euarchonta
    - Scandentia
    - Primatomorpha
      - Dermoptera
      - Primates
        - Strepsirrhini
          - lemuroids
          - lorisoids
        - Haplorrhini
          - Tarsiiformes
          - Simiiformes
            - Platyrrhini
            - Catarrhini
