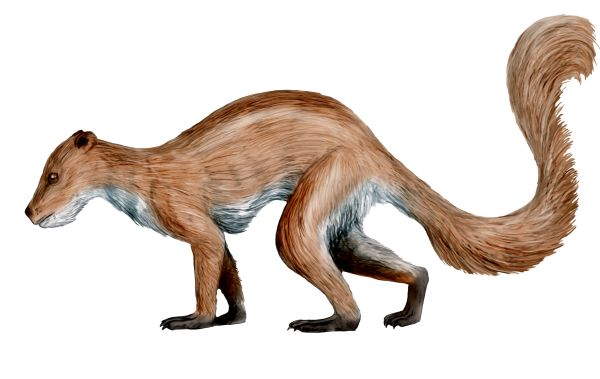
- Plesiadapis

Scientific classification
- Kingdom: Animalia
- Phylum: Chordata
- Class: Mammalia
- Clade: Pan-Primates
- Order: †Plesiadapiformes; Simons and Tattersall, 1972

Groups included
- Micromomyidae; Paromomyidae; Picromomyidae; Palaechthonidae; Microsyopidae; Chronolestidae; Plesiadapidae; Carpolestidae; Purgatoriidae (?); Saxonellidae; Toliapinidae

Cladistically included but traditionally excluded taxa
- Primates

= Plesiadapiformes =

Plesiadapiformes Temporal range: 66–46.2 Ma Paleocene–Middle Eocene

Extinct order of mammals

Plesiadapiformes ("Adapid-like" or "near Adapiformes") is an extinct basal pan-primates group, as sister to the rest of the pan-primates. The pan-primates together with the Dermoptera form the Primatomorpha. Purgatorius may not be a primate as an extinct sister to the rest of the Dermoptera or a separate, more basal stem pan-primate branch. Even with Purgatorius removed, the crown primates may even have emerged in this group.

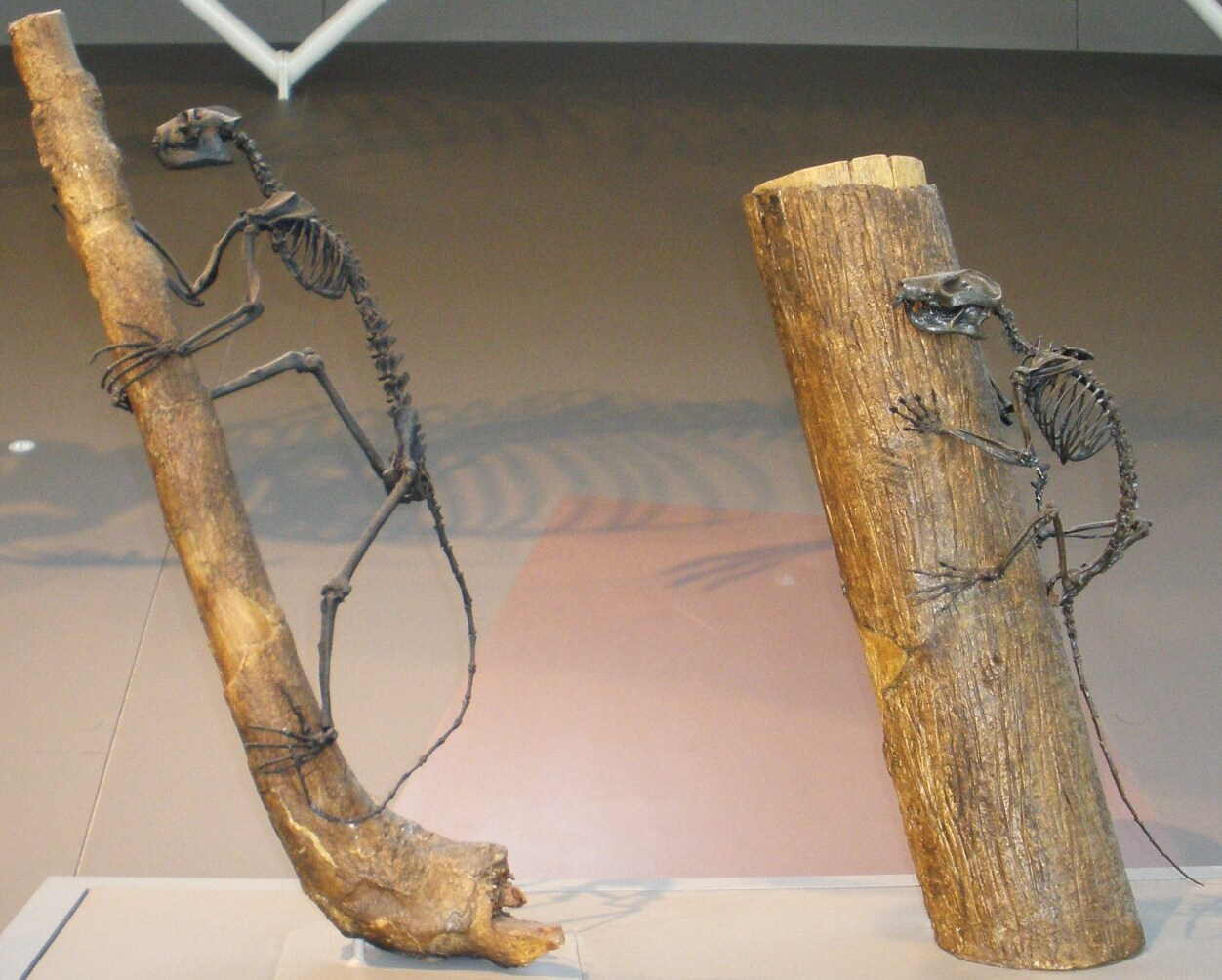
The plesiadapiform Plesiadapis cookei (right), compared to Notharctus tenebrosus (left), an early crown primate. Both come from Eocene Wyoming, though the former is slightly geologically older.

Plesiadapiformes first appear in the fossil record between 65 and 55 million years ago, although many were extinct by the beginning of the Eocene. They may be the earliest known mammals to have finger nails in place of claws. In 1990, K.C. Beard attempted to link the Plesiadapiformes with the order Dermoptera. They proposed that digital proportions of the fossil paromomyid Phenacolemur indicated gliding habits similar to that of colugos.

In the following simplified cladogram, the crown primates are classified as highly derived Plesiadapiformes, possibly as sister of the Plesiadapoidea. The crown primates are cladistically granted here into the Plesiadapiformes, and "Plesiadapiformes" become a junior synonym of the primates. With this tree, the Plesiadapiformes are not literally extinct (in the sense of having no surviving descendants). The crown primates are also called "Euprimates" in this context.

- Euarchontoglires
  - Glires
    - Rodentia (rodents)
    - Lagomorpha (rabbits, hares, pikas)
  - Euarchonta
    - Scandentia (treeshrews)
    - Primatomorpha
      - Dermoptera (colugos)
      - Primates/ Plesiadapiformes
        - †Purgatoriidae
        - - †Micromomyidae
          - - †Microsyopidae
            - - - †Paromomyidae
                - †Palaechthonidae
              - - Plesiadapoidea
                  - †Carpolestidae
                  - †Plesiadapidae
                - Crown Primates

Alternatively, in 2018, the Plesiadapiformes were proposed to be more related to Dermoptera, or roughly corresponding to Primatomorpha, with both Dermoptera and the primates emerging within this group. Also in a 2020 paper, the primates and Dermoptera were jointly considered sister to the plesiadapiform Purgatoriidae, resulting in the following phylogenetic tree.

- Euarchontoglires
  - Glires
    - Rodentia (rodents)
    - Lagomorpha (rabbits, hares, pikas)
  - Euarchonta
    - Scandentia (treeshrews)
    - Primatomorpha/ Plesiadapiformes
      - - †Purgatoriidae
        - crown Primatomorpha
          - Dermoptera (colugos)
          - Primates
      - †Plesiadapiform s.s.

Traditionally, they were regarded as a separate extinct order of Primatomorpha, but it now appears that groups such as the extant primates and/or the Dermoptera have emerged in the group.

Similarly, in 2021 the Purgatoriidae were classified as sister to Dermoptera, while the rest of the Plesiadapiformes appear to be sister to the remaining primates:

- Euarchonta
  - Scandentia
  - Primatomorpha/ Plesiadapiformes s.l.
    - Dermoptera
      - Purgatoriidae
      - crown Dermoptera
    - Primates
      - Plesiadapiformes s.s.
      - - Palenochtha weissae
        - - Toliapinidae
            Avenius amatorum
          - - Altanius orlovi
            - crown Primates
              - Strepsirrhini/ Adapiformes s.l.
                crown Strepsirrhini
              - Haplorhini/ Omomyiformes s.l.
                - Archicebus achilles
                - Teilhardina s.l.
                  - Teilhardina s.s.
                    - Teilhardina asiatica
                    - - Teilhardina belgica
                      - Teilhardina magnoliana
                  - - Teilhardina brandti
                    - crown Haplorhini
                      - Tarsiiformes
                        - Omomyiformes s.s.
                        - - Teilhardina s.s
                          - crown Tarsiiformes
                      - Simiiformes

One possible classification table of plesiadapiform families is listed below.

- Plesiadapiformes
  - Family Micromomyidae
  - Superfamily Paromomyoidea
    - Family Paromomyidae
    - Family Picromomyidae
    - Family Palaechthonidae
    - Family Microsyopidae
  - Superfamily Plesiadapoidea
    - Family Carpolestidae
    - Family Chronolestidae
    - Family Plesiadapidae
    - Family Saxonellidae
