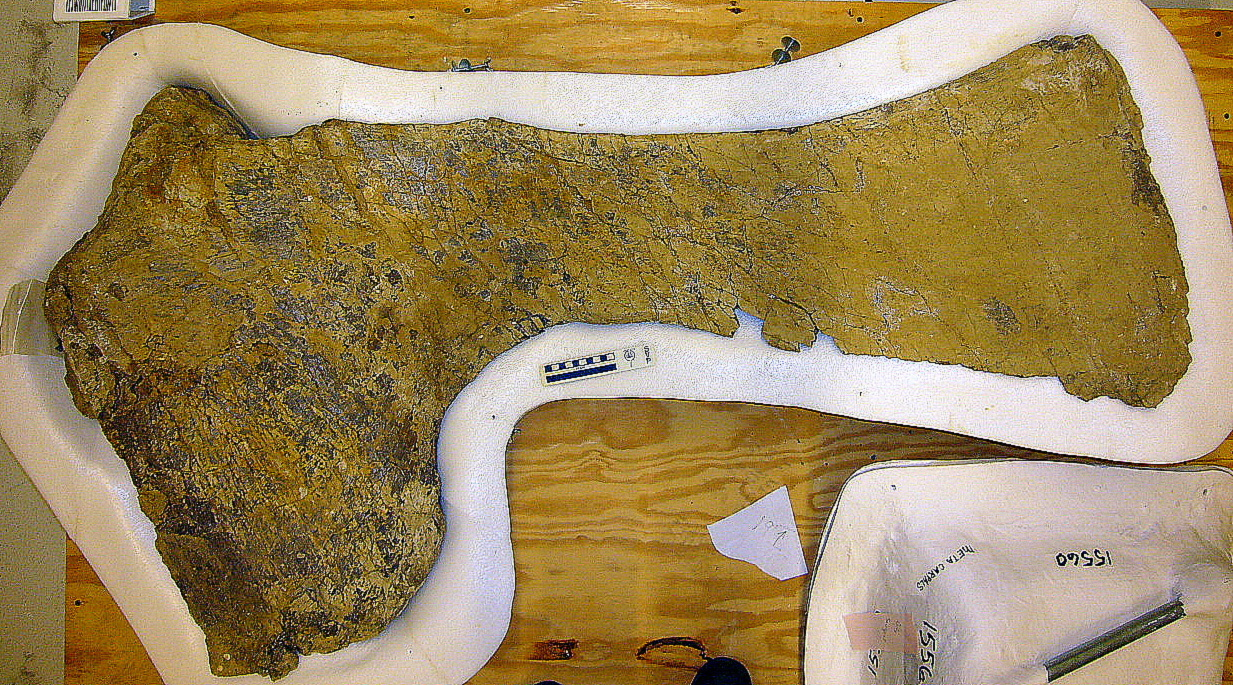
- Holotype scapula of Utetitan

Scientific classification
- Kingdom: Animalia
- Phylum: Chordata
- Class: Reptilia
- Clade: Dinosauria
- Clade: Saurischia
- Clade: †Sauropodomorpha
- Clade: †Sauropoda
- Clade: †Macronaria
- Clade: †Titanosauria
- Genus: †Utetitan; Paul, 2025
- Species: †U. zellaguymondeweyae

Binomial name
- †Utetitan zellaguymondeweyae Paul, 2025

= Utetitan =

Utetitan Temporal range: Late Cretaceous, late Maastrichtian

Genus of titanosaurian dinosaurs

Utetitan (meaning "Ute giant") is an extinct genus of titanosaurian sauropod dinosaur from the Late Cretaceous of North America. The genus contains a single species, Utetitan zellaguymondeweyae, known from partial skeletons previously assigned to Alamosaurus. Fossils assigned to this species have been found in the North Horn Formation of Utah, and the Black Peaks and Javelina formations of Texas, United States.

== Discovery and naming ==
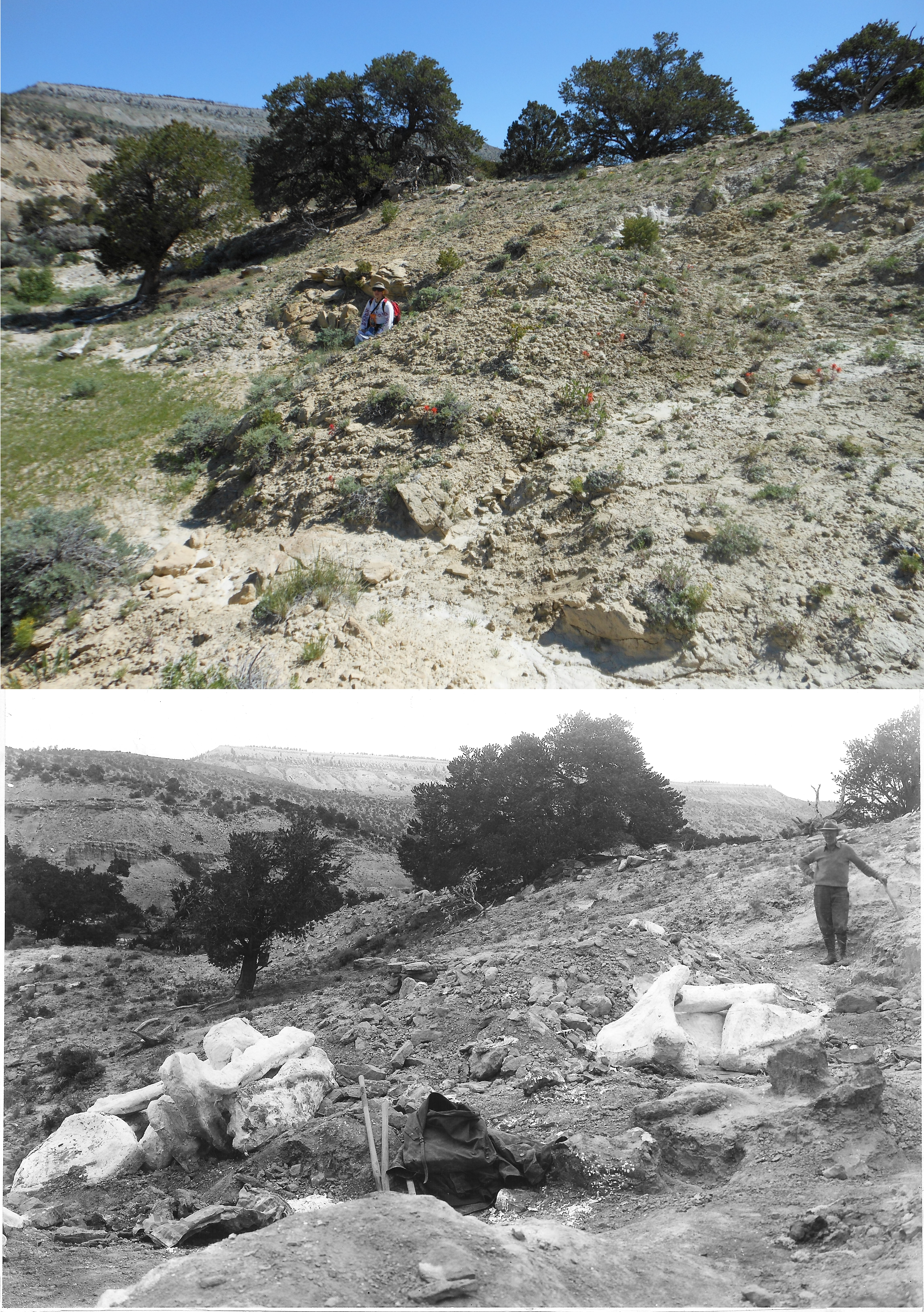
USNM 15560 (Utetitan holotype) quarry in 2013 (top) and 1937 (bottom), North Horn Formation, Utah

As part of the Smithsonian Paleontological Expedition in June 1937, George B. Pearce collected a partial skeleton of a large titanosaur sauropod from outcrops of the North Horn Formation on North Horn Mountain in Emery County of Utah, United States. Pearce noted that a sacrum comprising five vertebrae was identified there, but not collected. The specimen, now accessioned at the United States National Museum of Natural History (Smithsonian) as USNM 15560, consists of a partially articulated series of the first 30 articulated caudal vertebrae with 25 associated chevrons, both ischia, and sternals, the right scapulocoracoid, bones of the right arm (humerus, ulna, radius, and metacarpals), and partial dorsal ribs. In 1946, Charles W. Gilmore described the remains, assigning them to Alamosaurus sanjuanensis, a titanosaur species he had named 24 years prior based on an isolated scapula (USNM 10486) and ischium (USNM 10487) from the Ojo Alamo Formation of New Mexico. Gilmore used the remains to provide an updated diagnosis for the animal, as well as propose an equivalent age for the two formations.

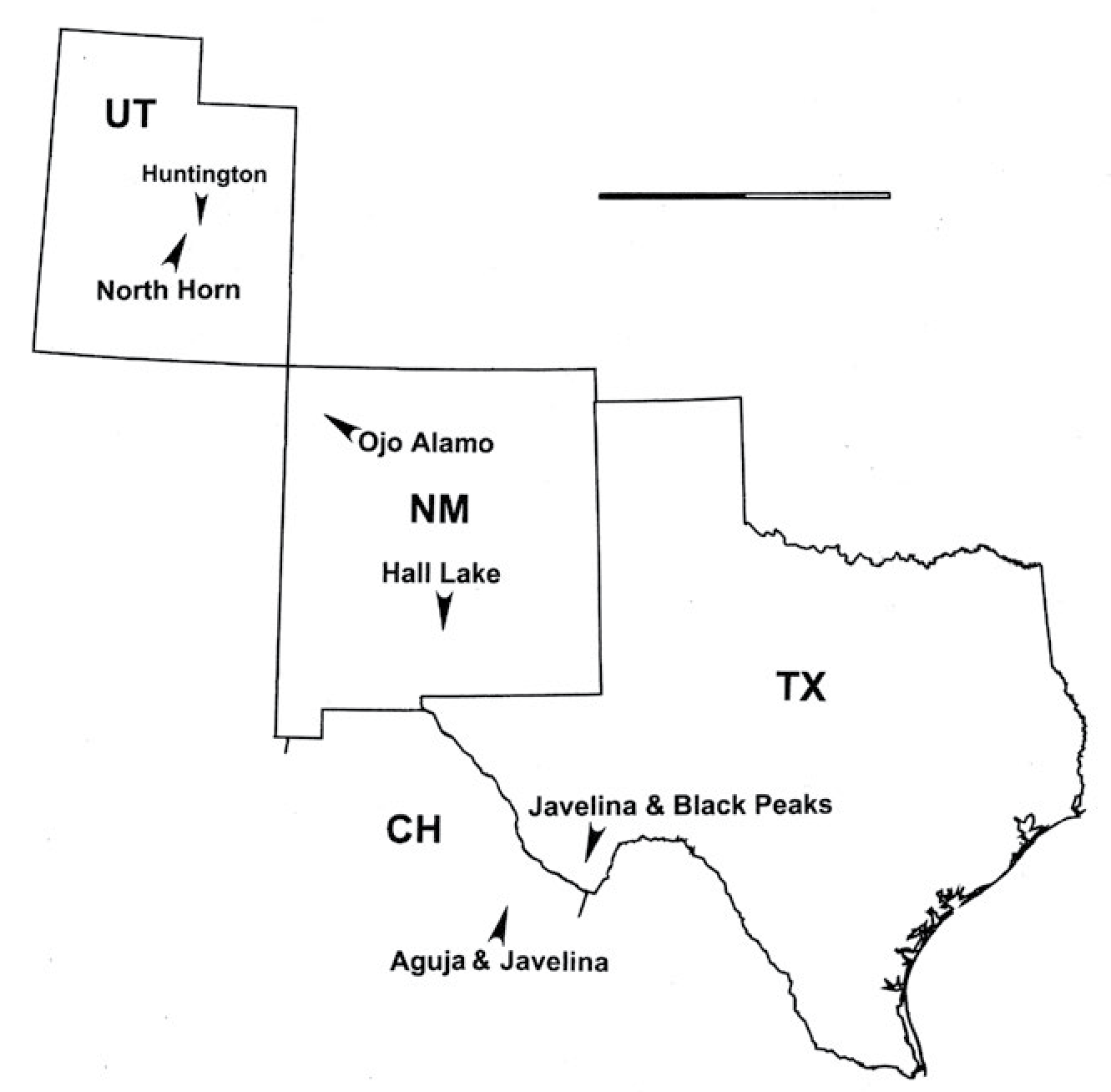
Utetitan type locality (North Horn, UT) and other proposed occurrences (Javelina & Black Peaks, TX)

In 1966, paleontologist James Jensen conducted additional excavations at a nearby site, collecting the proximal head of a humerus and femur, and a tail vertebra, accessioned as BYU 9087. Jensen later discovered that these bones were likely found near the original USNM 15560 site, and in 1973 attempted to relocate this site with Jack McIntosh, but was unsuccessful. In September 1977, Jensen rediscovered the quarry, a task he described as "more difficult than it should have been," as the quarry photograph he was referencing was mirrored in Gilmore's 1946 publication. After realizing the image's reversal, he was able to locate the hill "within seconds of scanning the horizon". After obtaining permission from the United States Forest Service to reopen the quarry with the hopes of obtaining additional material in September 1980, Jensen discovered that all that remained of the USNM 15560 sacrum was brown sediment, eroded ("rotted", in his words) beyond recognition. Jensen maintained that BYU 9087 does not belong to the same individual as USNM 15560 due to differences in locality and size. In 2015, Carrano and D'Emic described the presence of multiple osteoderms associated with USNM 15560.

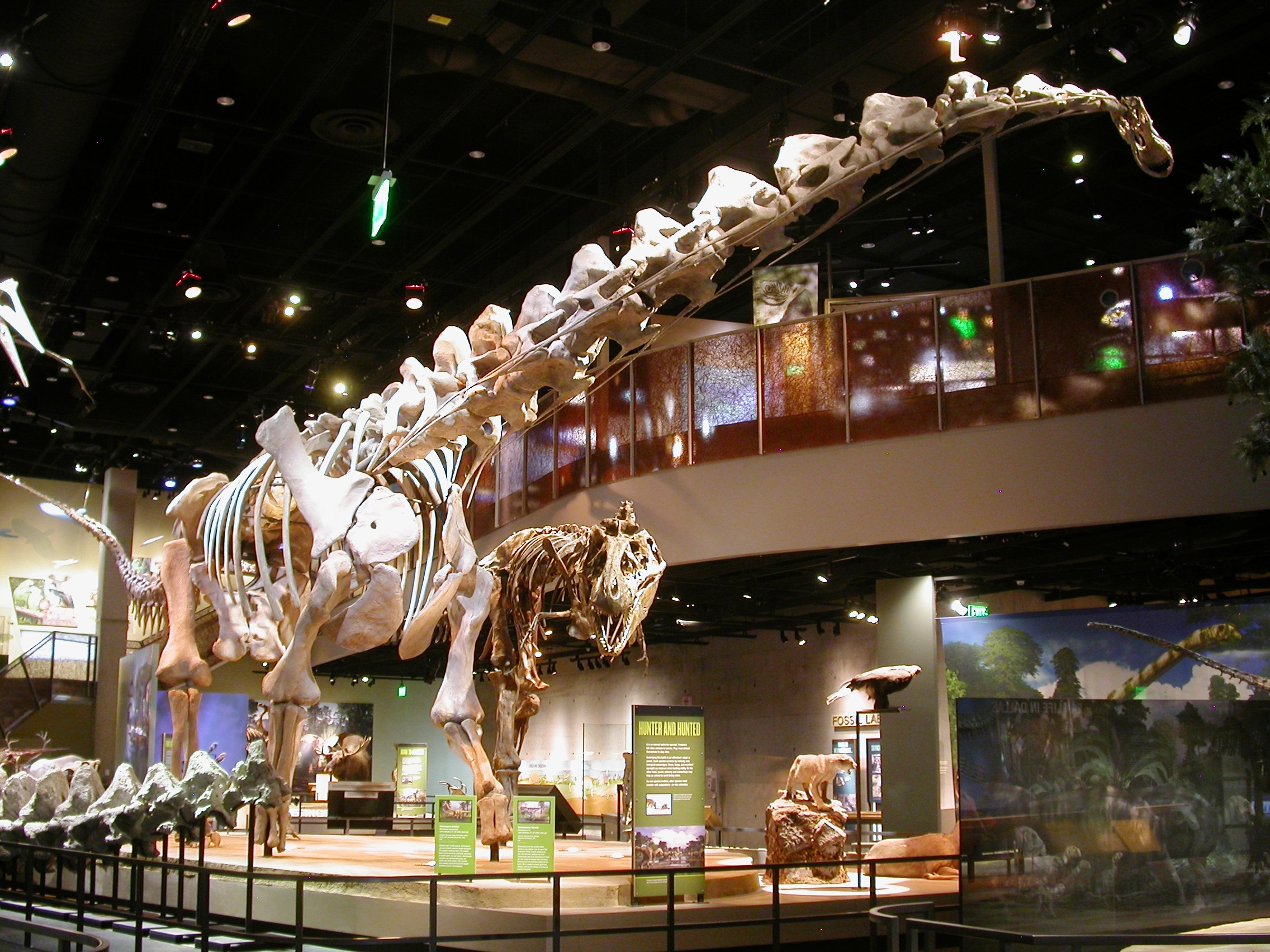
Reconstructed skeleton of Alamosaurus at the Perot Museum, based on a composite of several North American titanosaur specimens

The name "Utetitan" first appeared in the third edition of Gregory S. Paul's popular science book, The Princeton Field Guide to Dinosaurs. Since the publication of the name did not meet the requirements of the ICZN, it was considered an informal name.

In 2025, Paul described Utetitan zellaguymondeweyae as a new genus and species of titanosaurian sauropod based on these fossil remains. The generic name, Utetitan, combines a reference to the Ute people of central Utah, on whose native lands the holotype was found, with the word "titan", a common suffix for the names of large sauropods, referencing the pre-Olympian gods of Greek mythology. The specific name, zellaguymondeweyae, honors Paul's grandmother, Zella Guymon Dewey, who lived near the type locality.

Additional remains assigned to Alamosaurus from the Black Peaks and possibly Javelina formations of Texas may also belong to this genus.

The restored Alamosaurus skeletal mount at the Perot Museum is reconstructed based on a composite of several titanosaur specimens found in Late Cretaceous rocks of North America. These include the forelimbs and tail of the Utetitan holotype (USNM 15560), an articulated series of nine cervical vertebrae (BIBE 45854) discovered in the Black Peaks Formation in Big Bend National Park, Texas, and the torso, pelvis, and hindlimbs of TMM 41541-1 from the Javelina Formation of Texas. Paul (2025) regards the latter two specimens as either belonging to a titanosaur of uncertain affinities or Utetitan.

== Description ==
=== Size ===
Size of North American titanosaur specimens compared to a human, including the Utetitan (second silhouette) and Alamosaurus (third silhouette) holotypes

In his description of Utetitan, Gregory S. Paul proposed a body mass of 16–17 t (35,000–37,000 lb) for the holotype (USNM 15560) and specimens TMM 46052-1 and USNM 10487. For a larger specimen, TMM 41541, he suggested a body mass of 22–24 t (49,000–53,000 lb). A mid-cervical (neck) vertebra from the Ojo Alamo Formation was suggested to have come from an animal of a similar size to Futalognkosaurus, with a larger body mass of 30 t (66,000 lb). Other fragmentary specimens, including a femur (the long bone of the upper leg), a partial pes (foot), and a tibia (shin bone), appear to belong to similarly large animals. Due to the difficulty of estimating full body length based on fragmentary remains, Paul abstained from estimating the body length of Utetitan.

=== Skeletal anatomy ===
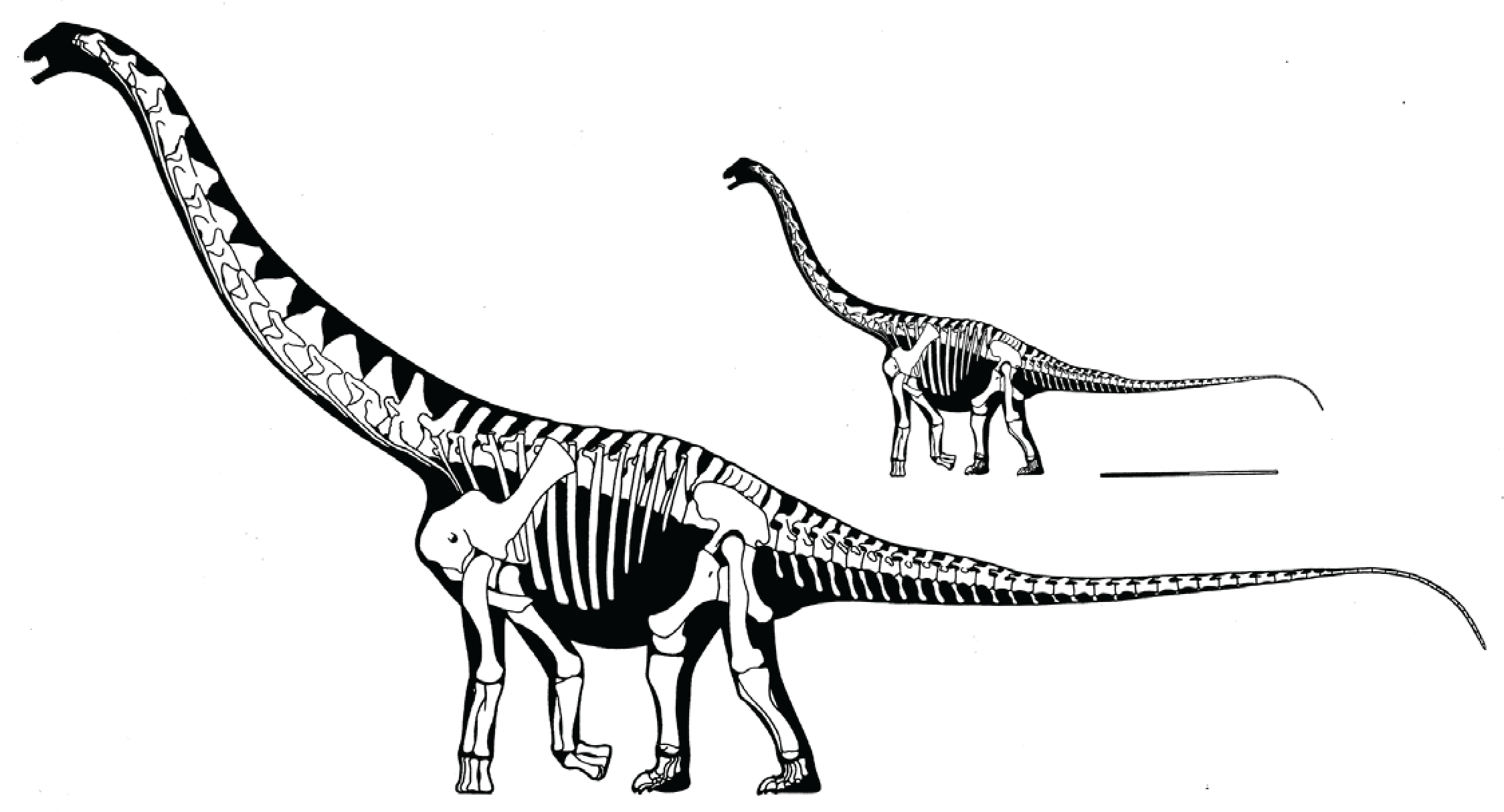
Reconstructed skeleton of a generalized North American titanosaur, scaled to the size of the Utetitan holotype (larger skeleton) and a juvenile individual of less certain affinities (smaller skeleton)

Paul (2025) differentiated Utetitan from Alamosaurus based on six characteristics. The acromion process of its scapula (shoulder blade) is large and more prominent than in Alamosaurus, although this has previously been attributed to post-mortem distortion of the bone. Viewed posteriorly (from the rear), the scapula is sinusoidal; its unusual shape is contributed to by a prominent, triangular glenoid process. The scapular blade of Utetitan flares posterodorsally (rearward and toward the top) more than that of Alamosaurus. The lateral (toward the outside) process of the ischium is smaller in Utetitan than in Alamosaurus, and the ischium overall is moderately concave. Another suggested diagnostic trait is the robustness of the femur; two femora from the upper deposits of the Javelina Formation, assigned to Utetitan are more robust than those in lower deposits.

== Classification ==
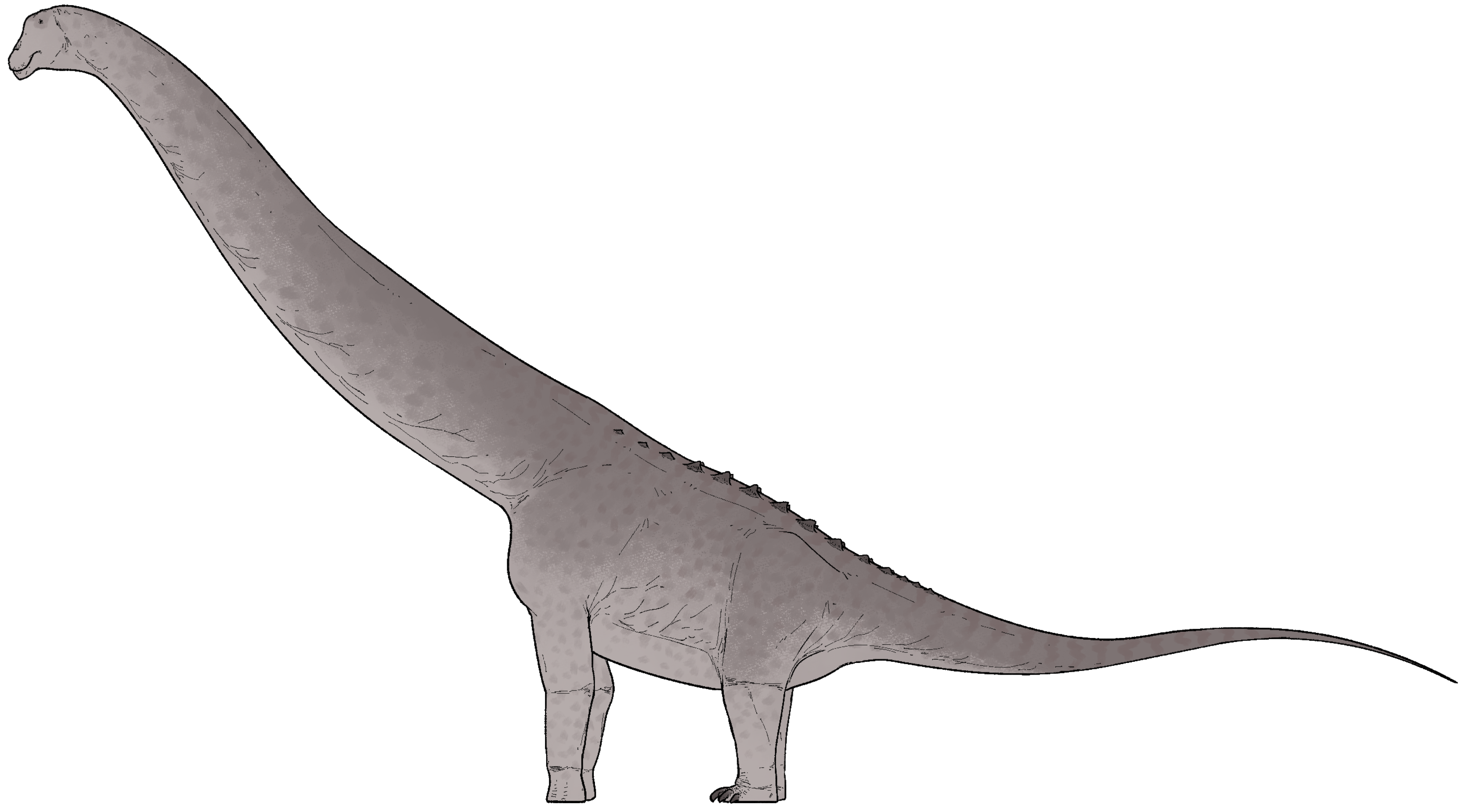
Speculative life restoration of Utetitan

In describing Utetitan, Paul (2025) erected a new titanosaur subfamily, Utetitaninae, to encompass both the new genus and Alamosaurus. He did not perform a phylogenetic analysis or assign this subfamily to a more specific titanosaurian family; rather, he treated it as a direct subset of the broader clade Titanosauria, noting the unresolved nature of higher-level taxonomy within titanosaurs.

== See also ==
- Alamosaurus
- Sauropod hiatus
- 2025 in archosaur paleontology
