= Black Peaks Formation =

Geologic formation in Texas, United States

- Stratigraphic range: Maastrichtian-Selandian (Tiffanian); ~66.5–60 Ma
- Type: Geological formation
- Unit of: Tornillo Group
- Underlies: Hannold Hill Formation
- Overlies: Javelina Formation

Lithology
- Primary: Mudstone
- Other: Sandstone, limestone

Location
- Coordinates: 29.3°N 103.4°W
- Approximate paleocoordinates: 36.0°N 82.8°W
- Region: Texas
- Country: United States

Type section
- Named for: Black Peaks, Brewster County, TX
- Black Peaks Formation (the United States) Black Peaks Formation (Texas)

The Black Peaks Formation is a geological formation in Texas whose strata date back to the Late Cretaceous (Maastrichtian) and Paleocene. It is exposed in and around Big Bend National Park in Brewster County, where it overlies the Late Cretaceous Javelina Formation and underlies the Eocene Hannold Hill Formation.

Paleocene vertebrate fossils can be found in the Black Peaks Formation, including many species of mammals (multituberculates, "condylarths", plesiadapiforms, etc.), as well as alligatorids like Bottosaurus. Turtle fossils have also been unearthed here.

== Geology ==
The Black Peaks Formation has a higher proportion of mudstone compared to the Javelina and Hannold Hill formations. Though this makes it more easily eroded (and thus less widely preserved), in areas with sandstone caprock it can form colorful badlands. The mudstone represents ancient floodplain deposits, though the formation also preserves bands of black-white-red "candy-striped" layers representing ancient lakes. The Black Peaks Formation is named after a trio of volcanic plugs on Tornillo Flat, a small plain in Big Bend National Park where the formation is most extensively exposed.

The K-Pg boundary is estimated to be shortly above base of the Black Peaks Formation, in a narrow contact zone where the sandstone-dominated Javelina Formation grades into the mudstone-dominated Black Peaks Formation. In the Dawson Creek area, a 63-million-year-old conglomerate bed divides the youngest dinosaur fossils of the Javelina Formation from the oldest mammal fossils of the Black Peaks Formation.

== Paleobiota ==
Most fossils from the Black Peaks Formation are Paleocene in age, from the Torrejonian and Tiffanian North American Land Mammal Ages (NALMAs). Some major fossil-bearing sites include:

- Dogie Mountain (TMM 42327), from the Torrejonian 2 NALMA.
- Tom's Top (TMM 41400), from the Torrejonian 2 NALMA.
- T2 (TMM 40147), from the Torrejonian 3 or Tiffanian 1 NALMA.
- C-Con (TMM 41274), from the Tiffanian NALMA.
- Ray's Bonebed (TMM 40535-40537, 41367) and vicinities, from the Tiffanian 3 NALMA.
- Joe's Bonebed (TMM 41365-41366), from the Tiffanian 5 NALMA.

=== Mammals ===
==== Condylarthra ====
"Condylarths" of the Blacks Peak Formation
Genus / Taxon	Species	Site(s)	NALMA	Notes	Images
Arctocyon	A. cf. A. ferox	Joe's Bonebed	Tiffanian	An arctocyonid	
Chriacus	C. baldwini	Dogie Mountain	Torrejonian 2	An arctocyonid	
Chriacus	C. cf. pelvidens	Tom's Top, Dogie Mountain	Torrejonian 2	An arctocyonid	
Deuterogonodon	D. noletil	Juniper Canyon, Robber's Roost	Torrejonian	An arctocyonid	
Ectocion	E. cf. E. montanensis	Ray's Bonebed, Joe's Bonebed	Tiffanian	A phenacodontid	
Ellipsodon	E. cf. E. inaequidens	Dogie Mountain	Torrejonian 2	A mioclaenid, originally identified as Ellipsodon priscus.	
cf. Goniacodon	cf. G. levisanus	Dogie Mountain	Torrejonian 2	A triisodontid, originally identified as Eoconodon sp.	
Haplaletes	H. disceptatrix	Joe's Bonebed	Tiffanian	A mioclaenid or apheliscid	
Haploconus	H. sp.	Dogie Mountain	Torrejonian 2	A periptychid, originally identified as Haploconus inopinatus.	
Lambertocyon	L. eximius	Joe's Bonebed, near New Taeniodont site	Tiffanian	An arctocyonid	
Mimotricentes	M. sp.	Dogie Mountain, Cobb's Knob	Torrejonian	An arctocyonid	
Mioclaenus	M. sp.	Tom's Top, Dogie Mountain	Torrejonian 2	A mioclaenid. A new species, previously mentioned under the nomen nudum Nexus plexus.	
Mioclaenus	M. turgidus	Tom's Top, Dogie Mountain	Torrejonian 2	A mioclaenid	
Periptychus	P. carinidens	Dogie Mountain, T2, C-Con, Ray's Bonebed	Torrejonian - Tiffanian	A periptychid. Some fossils were originally identified as Carsioptychus coarctatus or Periptychus superstes.	
Phenacodus	P. bisonensis	C-Con	Tiffanian	A phenacodontid, originally identified as Phenacodus matthewi.	
Phenacodus	P. grangeri	Ray's Bonebed vicinities, Green Hill, Joe's Bonebed, Rock Crusher	Tiffanian	A phenacodontid	
Phenacodus	P. matthewi	Ray's Bonebed vicinities, Joe's Bonebed	Tiffanian	A phenacodontid	
Phenacodus	P. primaevus	C-Con	Tiffanian	A phenacodontid, originally identified as Phenacodus grangeri.	
Promioclaenus	P. acolytus	C-Con	Tiffanian	A mioclaenid	
Promioclaenus	P. cf. P. lemuroides	Tom's Top	Torrejonian 2	A mioclaenid, originally identified as Ellipsodon priscus.	
Prothryptacodon	P. sp.	T2	Torrejonian	An arctocyonid	
Protoselene	P. cf. griphus	Yellow Hill	Torrejonian	A mioclaenid	
Protoselene	P. opisthacus	Ray's Bonebed	Tiffanian	A mioclaenid	
Tetraclaenodon	T. puercensis	Tom's Top, Dogie Mountain, T2	Torrejonian	A phenacodontid, originally identified as Phenacodus matthewi.	
Tricentes	T. truncatus	Ray's Bonebed, Joe's Bonebed	Tiffanian	An arctocyonid, possibly a synonym of Chriacus baldwini.	
Triisodon	T. quivirensis		Torrejonian 2	A triisodontid, originally identified as Eoconodon coryphaeus.	

==== Euarchonta ====
Euarchontans of the Blacks Peak Formation
Genus / Taxon	Species	Site(s)	NALMA	Notes	Images
Chiromyoides	C. sp.	Ray's Bonebed, Joe's Bonebed	Tiffanian	A plesiadapid plesiadapiform (primate relative), previously identified as Chiromyoides caesor or Plesiadapis gidleyi.	
Ignacius	I. frugivorus	Joe's Bonebed	Tiffanian	A paromomyid plesiadapiform (primate relative), previously considered a species of Phenacolemur.	
Mixodectes	M. malaris	Tom's Top, T2	Torrejonian	A mixodectid (primate and colugo relative)	
Nannodectes	N. gidleyi	Joe's Bonebed	Tiffanian	A plesiadapid plesiadapiform (primate relative), originally identified as Plesiadapis gidleyi.	
Navajovius	N. kohlhaasae	Ray's Bonebed, Joe's Bonebed	Tiffanian	A microsyopid plesiadapiform (primate relative)	
Palaechthon	P. cf. P. woodi	T2	Torrejonian	A "palaechthonid" plesiadapiform (primate relative), originally identified as Navajovius kohlhaasae.	
Plesiolestes	P. nacimienti	Tom's Top	Torrejonian 2	A "palaechthonid" plesiadapiform (primate relative), originally identified as Palaechthon nacimienti.	
Zanycteris?	Z.? sp.	Joe's Bonebed	Tiffanian	A picrodontid plesiadapiform. Identification doubtful.	

==== Multutuberculata ====
Multituberculates of the Blacks Peak Formation
Genus / Taxon	Species	Site(s)	NALMA	Notes	Images
Baiotomeus	B. douglassi	T2	Torrejonian	A ptilodontid, previously considered a species of Neoplagiaulax or Ptilodus.	
Mesodma	M. cf. pygmaea	T2	Torrejonian	A neoplagiaulacid	
Mesodma	M. thompsani	Dogie Mountain	Torrejonian 2	A neoplagiaulacid	
Mimetodon	M. silberlingi	T2, Joe's Bonebed	Torrejonian - Tiffanian	A neoplagiaulacid	
Parectypodus	P. sinclairi	T2	Torrejonian	A neoplagiaulacid, originally identified as Ectypodus musculus or Parectypodus sloani.	
Parectypodus	P. sloani	Joe's Bonebed	Tiffanian	A neoplagiaulacid	
Ptilodus	P. mediaevus	Tom's Top, T2	Torrejonian	A ptilodontid	
Ptilodus	P. sp.	C-Con	Tiffanian	A ptilodontid	
Ptilodus	P. torridus	Dogie Mountain	Torrejonian 2	A ptilodontid	
Stygimys	S. gratus	Snail's Place	Torrejonian?	A eucosmodontid	
Stygimys	S. vastus	Tom's Top	Torrejonian 2	A eucosmodontid	
Viridomys	V. bovorbatus	Dogie Mountain	Torrejonian 2	A multituberculate of uncertain affinities.	

==== Other mammals ====
Other mammals of the Blacks Peak Formation
Genus / Taxon	Species	Site(s)	NALMA	Notes	Images
"Barylambda"?	"B." jackwilsoni	Ray's Bonebed	Tiffanian	A pantodont, potentially synonymous with Caenolambda jepseni and unrelated to other species of Barylambda.	
Bryanictis	B. sp.	Tom's Top	Torrejonian 2	A viverravid (carnivoran relative), originally identified as Protictis terlinguae.	
Caenolambda	C. sp.	Schiebout-Reeves Quarry	Late Torrejonian or early Tiffanian	A pantolambdid pantodont	
Cimolestidae	indet.	Dogie Mountain	Torrejonian 2	An indeterminate cimolestid, originally identified as Gelastops sp.	
Jepsenella	J. sp.	Joe's Bonebed	Tiffanian	An apatemyid (aye-aye-like insectivore)	
Palaeictops?	P.? sp.	Joe's Bonebed	Tiffanian	A leptictid (hopping insectivore)	
Paleotomus	P. senior	C-Con	Tiffanian	A pantolestid (otter-like carnivore)	
Peradectes	P. sp.	Dogie Mountain	Torrejonian 2	A peradectid metatherian (marsupial relative), originally identified as Peratherium.	
Psittacotherium	P. multifragum	Dogie Mountain, Cobb's Knob, CT2, Ray's Bonebed and vicinities, Joe's Bonebed, New Taeniodont Site	Torrejonian - Tiffanian	A stylinodontid taeniodont	
Swaindelphys	S. solastella	Ray's Bonebed	Tiffanian	A "herpetotheriid" metatherian (marsupial relative). The largest metatherian known from Paleocene North America.	
Titanoides	T. zeuxis	Ray's Bonebed, Joe's Bonebed	Tiffanian	A titanoideid pantodont, probably a synonym of T. gidleyi.	

=== Reptiles ===
Indeterminate turtle, crocodylian, and lizard fossils are known throughout the formation. Rare fossils of dinosaurs (Alamosaurus and a tyrannosaurid tooth) and the giant pterosaur Quetzalcoatlus have been reported from the base of the Black Peaks Formation, though further investigation revealed that these are actually from the Javelina Formation, in layers displaced upwards by faulting.

Reptiles of the Blacks Peak Formation
Genus / Taxon	Species	Site(s)	NALMA	Notes	Images
Borealosuchus	B. sp.	Ray's Bonebed and vicinities, West Tornillo Flat	Tiffanian	A close relative of crocodylians	
Bottosaurus	B. fustidens	Ray's Bonebed vicinities, Joe's Bonebed	Tiffanian	A broad-snouted early caiman	
cf. Brachychampsa		Dogie Mountain, Tom's Top	Torrejonian	An alligatorid (alligator or caiman relative) with broad crushing teeth	
Champsosaurus	C. sp.	Moon Valley	Torrejonian?	A large choristodere	
Dunnophis	D. cf. D. microechinis	Dogie Mountain, Tom's Top	Torrejonian 2	A constrictor snake	
Glyptosaurus	G. cf. G. sylvestris	Dogie Mountain, Tom's Top	Torrejonian 2	A glyptosaurine (armored lizard)	
Hoplochelys	H. sp.	Moon Valley	Torrejonian?	A musk turtle	
Scolecophidia		Dogie Mountain	Torrejonian 2	A new species of blind snake, also known as the nomen nudum Suffosio praedatrix.	
Trionychidae	indet.		Torrejonian - Tiffanian	Indeterminate softshell turtle fossils	

=== Amphibians ===
Indeterminate frog fossils are also known from Dogie Mountain.

Amphibians of the Blacks Peak Formation
Genus / Taxon	Species	Site(s)	NALMA	Notes	Images
Habrosaurus	H. dilatus	Tom's Top	Torrejonian 2	A siren (sirenid salamander)	
Opisthotriton	O. kayi	Tom's Top	Torrejonian 2	A batrachosauroidid salamander	

=== Fish ===
Indeterminate teleost and gar fossils are known throughout the formation.

Fish of the Blacks Peak Formation
Genus / Taxon	Species	Site(s)	NALMA	Notes	Images
Amia	A. sp.	Dogie Mountain	Torrejonian 2	A bowfin	
Atractosteus	A. sp.	Dogie Mountain	Torrejonian 2	A gar	
Dasyatis	D. matrix	Dogie Mountain, Tom's Top	Torrejonian 2	A stingray	
Rhombodus	R. tortus	C-Con	Tiffanian	A stingray	

== See also ==
- List of dinosaur-bearing rock formations
- List of pterosaur-bearing stratigraphic units
