= Ojo Alamo Formation =

Geologic formation in New Mexico

- Stratigraphic range: Maastrichtian-Danian; ~67–64 Ma
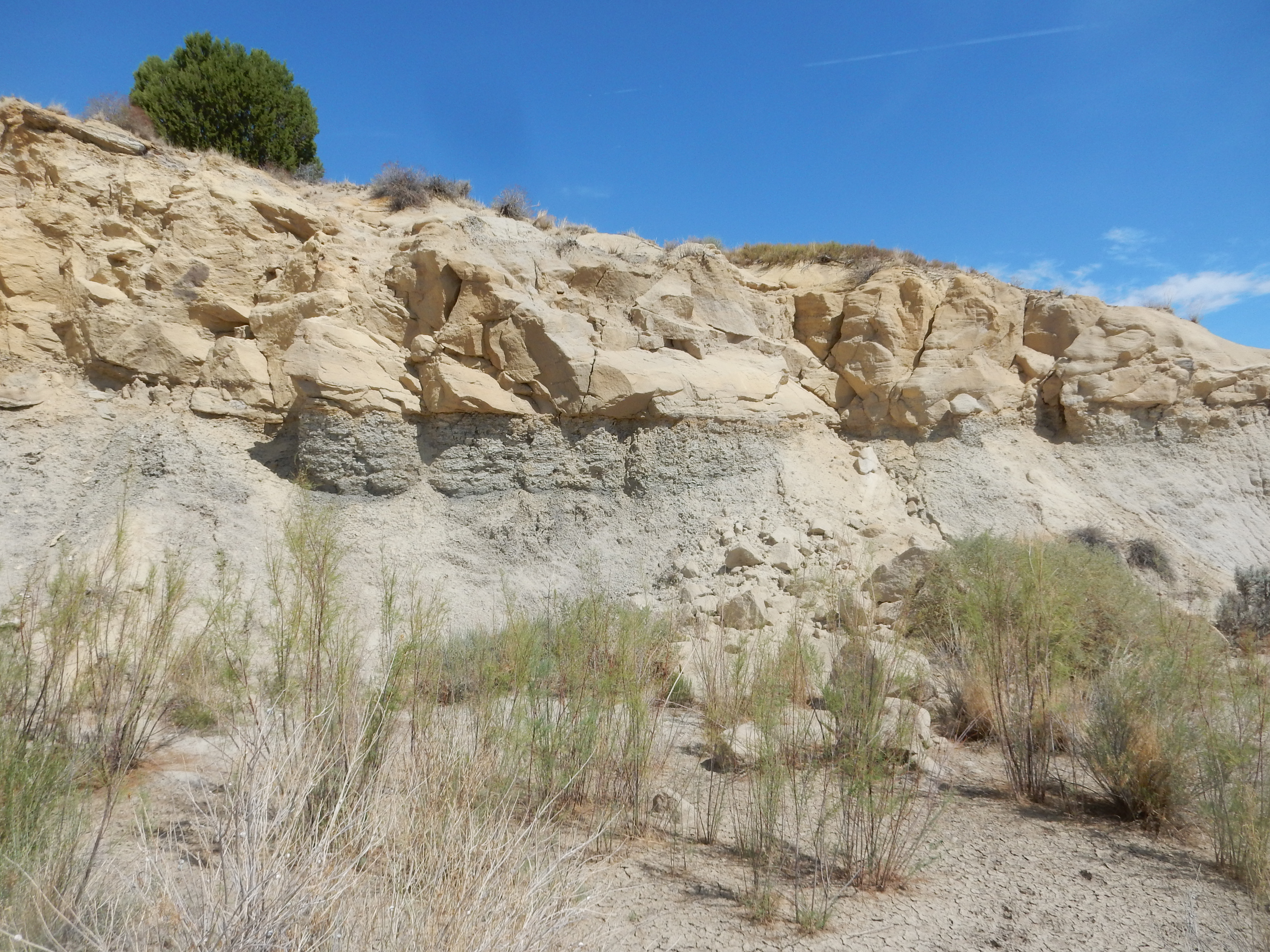
- Ojo Alamo Formation in the Bisti/De-Na-Zin Wilderness
- Type: Geological formation
- Sub-units: Naashoibito Member, Kimbeto Member
- Underlies: Nacimiento Formation
- Overlies: Kirtland Formation

Lithology
- Primary: Conglomerate, sandstone, shale

Location
- Coordinates: 36.3305764°N 108.0350723°W
- Region: San Juan Basin, New Mexico
- Country: United States

Type section
- Named for: Ojo Alamo Spring
- Named by: B. Brown
- Year defined: 1910

The Ojo Alamo Formation is a geologic formation in New Mexico spanning the Mesozoic/Cenozoic boundary. Non-avian dinosaur fossils have controversially been identified in beds of this formation dating from after the Cretaceous–Paleogene extinction event, but these have been explained as either misidentification of the beds in question or as reworked fossils, fossils eroded from older beds and redeposited in the younger beds. The formation is divided into the lower Naashoibito Member and the upper Kimbeto Member, which are separated by a large unconformity.

== Description ==
The Ojo Alamo Formation is divided into two subunits separated by a large unconformity—a gap in the geologic record. The lower Naashoibito member (sometimes considered part of the Kirtland Formation) was deposited during the Maastrichtian age of the Cretaceous period, specifically between about 70-68 million years ago. It overlies the De-na-zin member of the Kirtland formation, though the two are separated by another large unconformity that spans a period of geologic time equivalent to 73-69 million years ago. All dinosaur fossils probably come from this unit. The upper unit of the Ojo Alamo Formation is the Kimbeto Member, which was deposited mainly during the earliest Cenozoic (Danian age of the Paleogene period), between 66 and 64 million years ago. Argon dating indicates the base of the Naashoibito Member is 66.5 million years old.

In 2025, Flynn et al. determined the strata of the Naashoibito Member preserving non-avian dinosaur fossils to be latest Maastrichtian in age, yielding maximum depositional ages of 66.87 ± 0.04 Ma and 66.38 ± 0.08 Ma based on direct argon dating on two dinosaur fossil–bearing samples around 5 metres (16 ft) and 3.5 metres (11 ft) above the base of the member respectively. They interpreted that high diversity of North American dinosaurs lived before the Cretaceous–Paleogene extinction event based on this finding, and that Maastrichtian dinosaur faunas from Laramidia were not uniform in the entire continent. The Naashoibito Member is believed to represent a short period of geologic time,only 500,000 years.

== Fossils ==
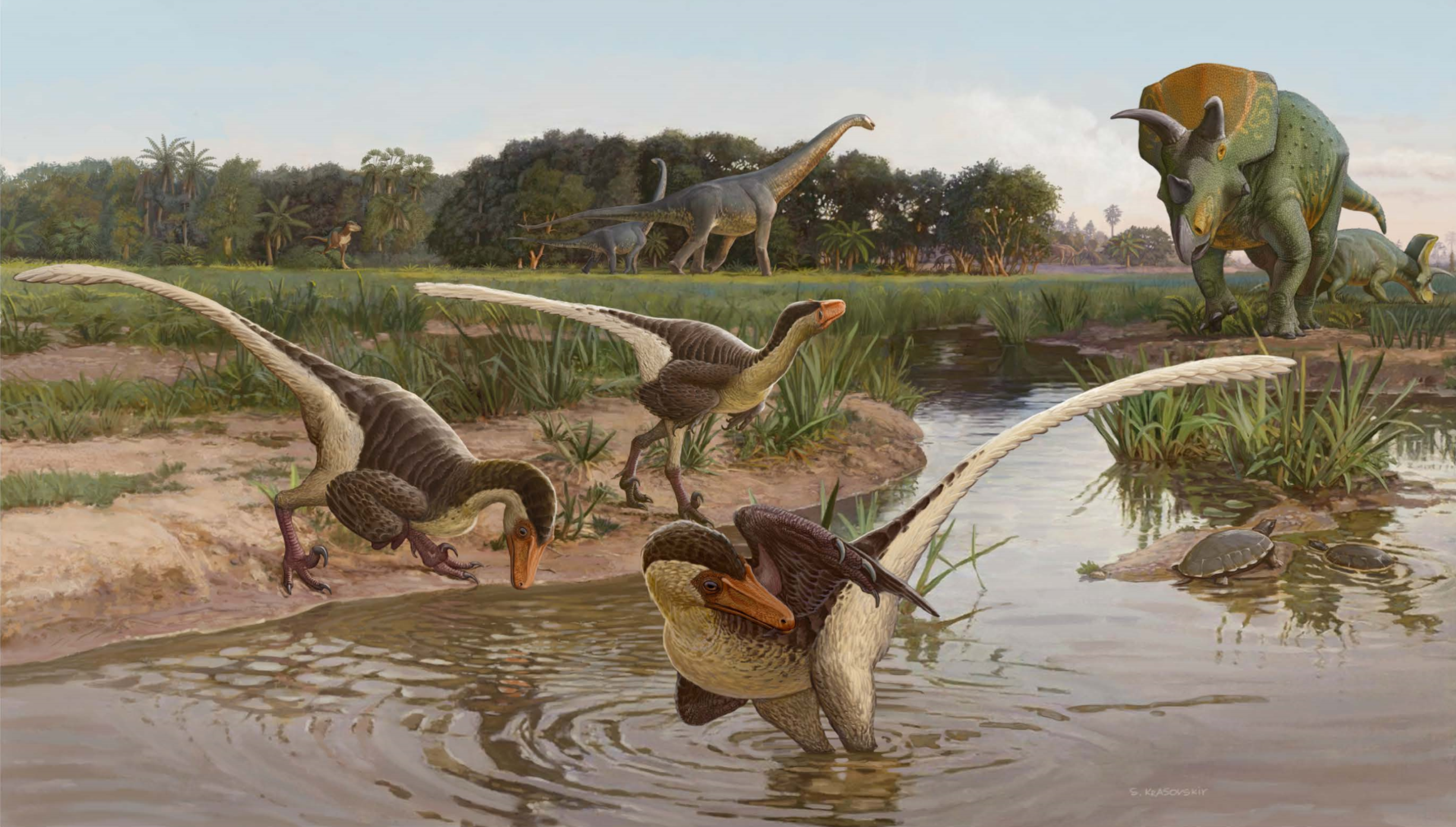
A restoration of the environment, featuring Dineobellator (center front), Ojoceratops (right), Tyrannosaurus (far left), and Alamosaurus (center back), taxa all known from the formation.

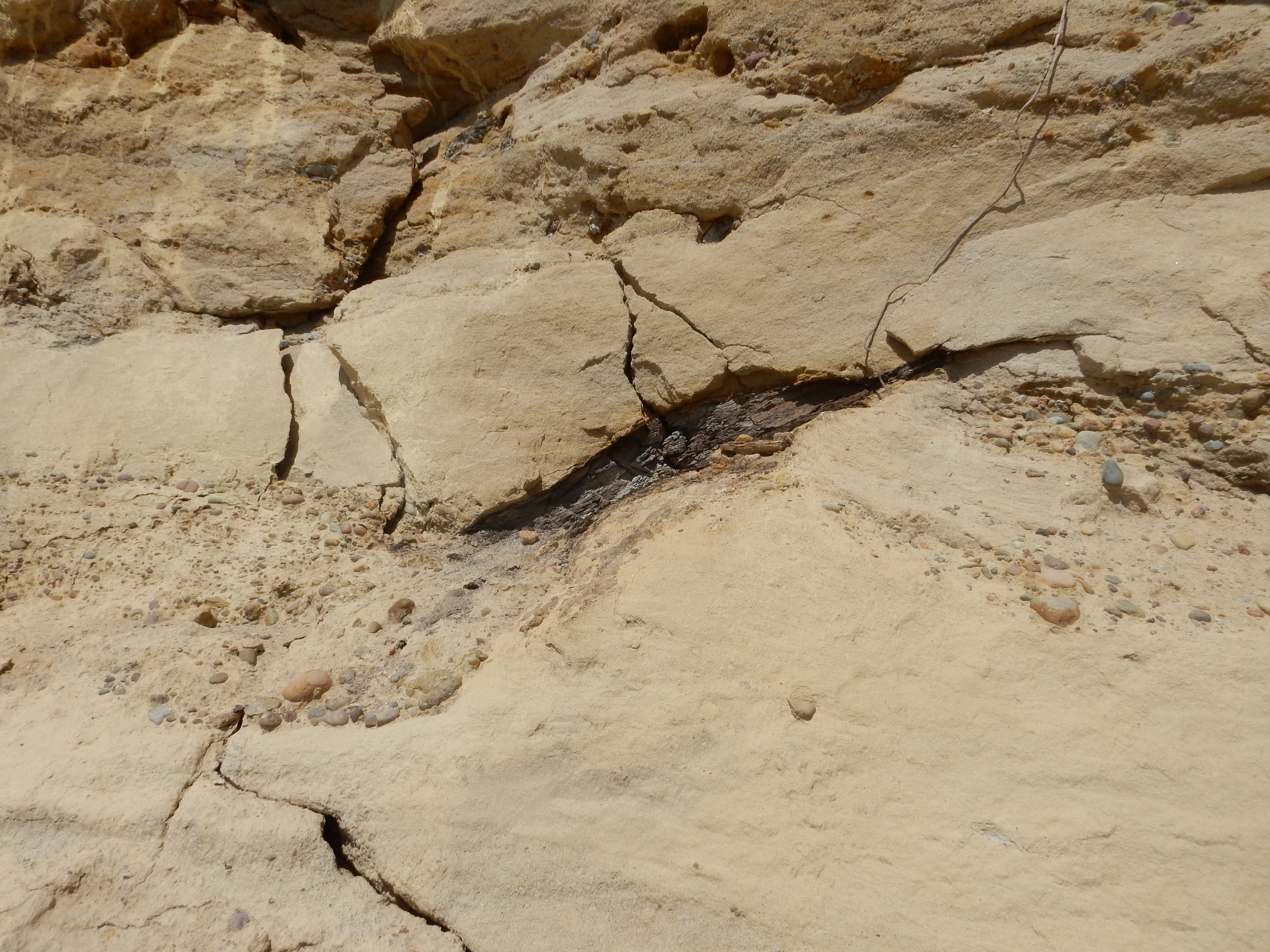
Ojo Alamo Formation showing conglomerate lens with petrified wood, De-Na-Zin Wilderness

Dinosaur remains are among the fossils that have been recovered from the formation, though all dinosaur remains come from the lowest part of the formation, the Naashoibito member (sometimes considered part of the Kirtland Formation, which dates to the late Maastrichtian stage of the Cretaceous period).

Some researchers have claimed to find isolated non-avian dinosaur remains in the younger Kimbeto Member. If this is the case, it would represent the only known instance of a non-avian dinosaur population persisting after the Cretaceous–Paleogene extinction event. However, most scientists consider these to have been stratigraphically misinterpreted or reworked from the older Naashoibito member.

=== Alamo Wash fauna ===
The following species are known to be present in the Naashoibito Member "Alamo Wash Fauna".

Fish

Genus	Species	Material	Notes	Images
Myledaphus	M. sp.	A single tooth	An anacoracid elasmobranch. A single tooth (NMMNH P-44485), consisting of a six-sided crown with double roots. Only occurrence of the genus in the Naashoibito Member, but miight actually be from the underlying De-na-zin Member of the Kirtland Formation.	
?Squatirhina	?S. sp.	An isolated tooth	An orectolobid elasmobranch. May represent the first and only record of this taxon from the Naashoibito Member.	
Lepisosteidae	Indeterminate	Multiple isolated scales	A gar	

Amphibians

Genus	Species	Material	Notes	Images
?Batrachosauroididae	Indeterminate	An incomplete trunk vertebra	An indeterminate salamander. Tentatively assigned to Batrachosauroididae based on general similarities to Opisthotrition-like specimens.	

Squamates

Genus	Species	Material	Notes	Images
Peneteius	P. sp.	A jaw fragment and multiple teeth	Fossil material requires proper documentation.	
?Chamops	?C. sp.	A tooth	A teiid lizard. The tooth was originally identified as that of a cyprinid fish. Its presence in the Alamo Wash fauna is questionable.	

Turtles

Genus	Species	Material	Notes	Images
Compsemys	C. sp.	Multiple shell fragments	A pleurosternid testudine. Species-level identification is not possible, but similarities have been noted with Compsemys vafer.	
Hoplochelys	H. sp.	A complete plastron and a few fragments		
Plastomenus	cf. P. sp.	Nearly complete right parietal	A trionychid testudine. Compares readily to Plastomenus thomasi.	
Adocidae	Indeterminate	Mostly carapace fragments	An adocid testudine. Among the attributed material is the holotype of Adocus vigoratus, now considered a nomen dubium.	
Basilemys	B. sp.	Fragments of carapace and plastron	A nanhsiungchelyid testudine. Previously Basilemys nobilis, it is now considered a nomen dubium which isn't assignable at the species level.	
Paracryptodira	Indeterminate	An incomplete carapace fragment	An indeterminate paracryptodiran. Similar in shell morphology to Compsemys.	
Baenidae	Indeterminate	Carapace and skull fragments	An indeterminate baenid.	
Trionychidae	Indeterminate	Dozens of specimens	An indeterminate trionychid. A lot of material has been recovered, but it is fragmentary and not able to be defined to the genus level.	
Testudinidae	Indeterminate	Indeterminate shell and carapace fragments.	Indeterminate testudine. Not identifiable to any lower taxonomic rank due to their fragmentary nature.	

Crocodylians

Genus	Species	Material	Notes	Images
Brachychampsa	cf. B. sp.	A single tooth	An alligatorid. The tooth was previously attributed to Allognathosuchus.	
Crocodylidae	Indeterminate	A mandibular fragment, multiple teeth and osteoderms.	An indeterminate crocodillian of which material has been referred to multiple genera in the past, including Leidyosuchus and Denazinosuchus.	

Dinosaurs

A bite-and-drag mark on a juvenile tyrannosaurid vertebra (NMMNH P-40953) is deep and narrow, suggesting the tooth that made it was strongly compressed and blade-like, unlike those of T. rex. This supports the presence of a distinct southern North American tyrannosaurid during the Maastrichtian.

Genus	Species	Material	Notes	Images
Dineobellator	D. notohesperus			
Ojoraptorsaurus	O. boerei		Possibly a nomen dubium	
Caenagnathidae	Indeterminate			
Ornithomimidae	Indeterminate			
Richardoestesia	R. sp.			
Troodontidae	Indeterminate			
Tyrannosaurus	cf. T. rex			
Alamosaurus	A. sanjuanensis		The last North American Titanosaur	
Glyptodontopelta	G. mimus			
Ankylosauridae	Indeterminate		Noted to be similar to Euoplocephalus and Ankylosaurus	
Ankylosauria	Indeterminate			
Hadrosauridae	Indeterminate			
Lambeosaurini	Indeterminate		Noted as being similar to Corythosaurus and Hypacrosaurus	
Ceratopsidae	Indeterminate			
Ojoceratops	O. fowleri			
Torosaurus	T. latus		Known from EKM 0001, a nearly complete skull and postcrania.	

Mammals

Genus	Species	Material	Notes	Images
Alphadon	cf. A. marshi			
Alphadontinae	Indeterminate			
Essonodon	E. browni			
Glasbius	cf. G. sp.			
Mesodma	M. formosa			
Meniscoessus	cf. M. sp.			
Multituberculata	Indeterminate			
Pediomyidae	cf. Indeterminate			

== History of investigation ==
The formation was named by Barnum Brown in 1910 for exposures near Ojo Alamo springs in the San Juan Basin. Baltz et al. reassigned the lower beds to the Kirtland Formation in 1966, but this has not been generally accepted.

== See also ==
- List of dinosaur-bearing rock formations
