= El Picacho Formation =

Geologic formation in Texas, United States

Coordinates: 30.4297°N 104.6508°W

- Stratigraphic range: Maastrichtian, 72–66 Ma
- Type: Geological formation

Location
- Region: North America

The El Picacho Formation is a geological formation in Texas, United States, whose strata date back to the Late Cretaceous. Dinosaur remains are among the fossils that have been recovered from the formation. The paleosols found here are rich in clay, calcite, and rhizoliths which show that during the Cretaceous period, this fossil formation, just like the neighboring Javelina Formation and Aguja Formation, was a fluvial flood plain.

== Vertebrate paleofauna ==
- Alamosaurus sanjuanensis?
- Chasmosaurinae indeterminate.
- Gryposaurus sp. (possibly Kritosaurus)
- Kritosaurus navajovius
- Nodosauridae indeterminate.
- Tyrannosauridae indeterminate.
- Ornithomimidae indeterminate.

== See also ==
- List of dinosaur-bearing rock formations
