= Tornillo Group =

- Stratigraphic range: Late Cretaceous - Early Eocene
- Type: Group
- Sub-units: Javelina Formation, Black Peaks Formation, Hannold Hill Formation

Location
- Region: Texas
- Country: United States

The Tornillo Group is a geologic group in Texas which dates from to the Late Cretaceous to the Early Eocene period. Dinosaur fossils have been unearthed in this group including Torosaurus, Tyrannosaurus, Alamosaurus and Kritosaurus.

== See also ==
- List of fossiliferous stratigraphic units in Texas
- Paleontology in Texas
