= Javelina Formation =

Geological formation in Texas, USA

- Stratigraphic range: Maastrichtian, 70–66.5 Ma
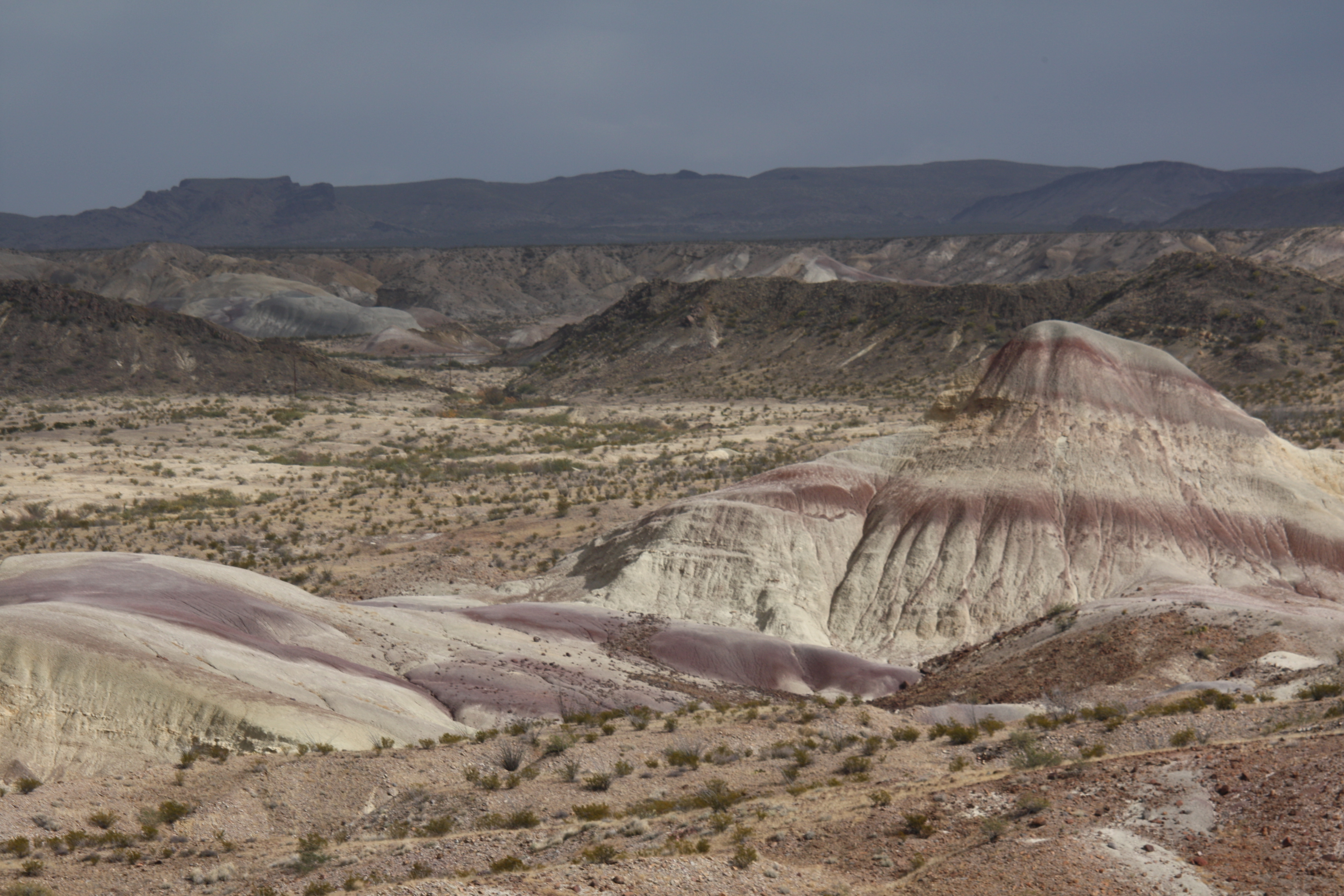
- Distinctive mauve and red beds of the Javelina Formation outcropping in Big Bend National Park, Texas
- Type: Geological formation
- Unit of: Tornillo Group
- Underlies: Black Peaks Formation
- Overlies: Aguja Formation

Lithology
- Primary: Sandstone
- Other: Claystone, mudstone, siltstone, conglomerate

Location
- Coordinates: 29.3°N 103.4°W
- Approximate paleocoordinates: 36.0°N 82.8°W
- Region: Texas
- Country: United States

Type section
- Named for: Javelina
- Javelina Formation (the United States) Javelina Formation (Texas)

The Javelina Formation is a geological formation in Texas. Dating has shown that the strata date to the Maastrichtian stage of the Late Cretaceous, approximately 70 to 66.5 million years old. The middle part of the formation has been dated to about 69 million years ago plus or minus 1 million years and the top situated near the Cretaceous–Paleogene boundary (in the overlying Black Peaks Formation), dated to 66 Ma ago. Dinosaur remains are among the fossils that have been recovered from the formation.

== Age ==
The typical age range of the Javelina Formation has been difficult to determine. In 2006, the middle portion of the Javenila Formation about 90 meters (300 ft) below the K-Pg boundary was dated to 69.0±0.9 million years ago by Lehman and colleagues. Using this date, in correlation with a measured age from the underlying Aguja Formation and the likely location of the K-Pg boundary in the overlying Black Peaks Formation, the authors argued that the Alamosaurus fauna seems to have lasted from about 70–66 million years ago, with the earliest records of Alamosaurus near the base of the Javelina Formation and the latest just below the K-Pg boundary in the Black Peaks Formation. However, Leslie et al. (2018) and Lehman et al. (2022) later corrected this age estimate, since the dinosaur fossils are actually known from the upper portion of the Javelina Formation. The K-Pg boundary of the Javelina Formation is known to be at the ~172 meters (564 ft) level, and the youngest-known Alamosaurus fossil-bearing locality (TxVP 42426, incorrectly referred to TMM 41450 by Leslie et al. and subsequently corrected by Lehman et al.) is known from the top of the sandstone unit at ~145 meters (476 ft) level, approximately ~27 meters (89 ft) below the K-Pg boundary. With dating based on magnetostratigraphy constraining the maximum depositional age of the dinosaur fossil-bearing section at approximately 66.4 million years ago, the Alamosaurus fauna can be dated to the latest Maastrichtian age.

== Fossil content ==
Color key
| Taxon | Reclassified taxon | Taxon falsely reported as present | Dubious taxon or junior synonym | Ichnotaxon | Ootaxon | Morphotaxon |

Notes
Uncertain or tentative taxa are in small text; ~~crossed out~~ taxa are discredited.

=== Vertebrate paleofauna ===
==== Dinosaurs ====
===== Ankylosaurs =====
Vertebrates of the Javelina Formation
| Genus | Species | Location | Stratigraphic position | Material | Notes | Images |
|---|---|---|---|---|---|---|
| Ankylosauria indet. | Indeterminate | | Upper | | Fragmentary remains of an unnamed ankylosaur | |
| Nodosauridae Indet. | Indeterminate | | | | An undescribed nodosaurid. | |

===== Ceratopsians =====
Vertebrates of the Javelina Formation
| Genus | Species | Location | Stratigraphic position | Material | Notes | Images |
|---|---|---|---|---|---|---|
| Bravoceratops | B. polyphemus | | | | A chasmosaurine ceratopsid known from the lowermost part of the Javelina Formation which dates back to the early Maastrichtian. | |
| Chasmosaurinae indet. | Indeterminate | | Lower and Upper | Dentary and horncore | Multiple remains of indeterminate chasmosaurines. The horncore and dentary are stated as being similar in size to Triceratops. The horncore comes from the Lower Javelina Formation and the dentary comes from the Upper Javelina Formation. | |
| Torosaurus | T. cf. utahensis | | | | A chasmosaurine ceratopsid whose remains have been found in the Frenchman Formation, Hell Creek Formation, North Horn Formation, McRae Formation, and Lance Formation. | |
| Ceratopsidae indet. | Indeterminate | | Uppermost | Syncervical | A large indeterminate ceratopsid, only diagnostic to Ceratopsidae. | |

===== Hadrosaurs =====
Hadrosaurs of the Javelina Formation
| Genus | Species | Location | Stratigraphic position | Material | Notes | Images |
|---|---|---|---|---|---|---|
| Gryposaurus? | G.? alsatei | | Upper | | A saurolophine hadrosaurid known from the Two Medicine Formation, the Dinosaur Park Formation, the Kaiparowits Formation, possible remains have also been unearthed in the El Picacho Formation. | |
| Kritosaurus | K. cf. navajovius | | | | A saurolophine hadrosaurid, also known from the Kirtland Formation, Aguja Formation, Ojo Alamo Formation and the El Picacho Formation. A possible second species of Kritosaurus might have lived in the Javelina Formation. Fossils have also been unearthed in the Olmos Formation. | |
| Saurolophinae indet. | Indeterminate | | | | A saurolophine handrosaurid similar to the genus Saurolophus. | |

===== Sauropods =====
Sauropods of the Javelina Formation
| Genus | Species | Location | Stratigraphic position | Material | Notes | Images |
|---|---|---|---|---|---|---|
| Alamosaurus | A. sanjuanensis | | Upper | | A titanosaurian sauropod, also from the Ojo Alamo Formation | |

===== Theropods =====
Theropods of the Javelina Formation
| Genus | Species | Location | Stratigraphic position | Material | Notes | Images |
|---|---|---|---|---|---|---|
| Ornithomimidae indet. | Indeterminate | | Upper | | Fragmentary remains of an unnamed ornithomimid | |
| Saurornitholestes | S. cf. langstoni | | | | A dromaeosaurid | |
| Troodontidae indet. | Indeterminate | | | | A troodontid | |
| Tyrannosaurus | Identified as either cf. T. sp. or T. rex | | Upper | | A tyrannosaurid, originally identified from the Hell Creek Formation. Also found in the Denver, Ferris, Frenchman, Lance, Livingston, North Horn, Scollard, and Willow Creek Formations. | |
| Tyrannosauridae Indet. | Indeterminate | | Upper | Hindlimb and metatarsal material. | Estimated as 75% the size of Sue the T. rex. Possibly a sub-adult Tyrannosaurus or Small bodied taxon. | |

==== Pterosaurs ====
Pterosaurs of the Javelina Formation
| Genus | Species | Location | Stratigraphic position | Material | Notes | Images |
|---|---|---|---|---|---|---|
| Quetzalcoatlus | Q. northropi | | Upper | | An azhdarchid pterosaur | |
| Quetzalcoatlus | Q. lawsoni | | | | An azhdarchid pterosaur | |
| Wellnhopterus | W. brevirostris | | | | An azhdarchid pterosaur | |

==== Turtles ====
Fish of the Javelina Formation
| Genus | Species | Location | Stratigraphic position | Material | Notes | Images |
|---|---|---|---|---|---|---|
| Trionychidae indet. | Indeterminate | | | | Indeterminate turtle remains | |

==== Fish ====
Fish of the Javelina Formation
| Genus | Species | Location | Stratigraphic position | Material | Notes | Images |
|---|---|---|---|---|---|---|
| Dasyatis | Unknown | | | | A ray | |
| Rhombodus | Unknown | | | | A ray | |

=== Flora ===
Woody dicots and angiosperms have been unearthed in this formation. Plant fossils indicate that this area was a woodland habitat.

Flora of the Javelina Formation
| Genus | Species | Location | Stratigraphic position | Material | Notes | Images |
|---|---|---|---|---|---|---|
| Javelinoxylon | J. multiporosum | | | | A dicotyledonous tree | |

== See also ==
- List of dinosaur-bearing rock formations
- List of fossiliferous stratigraphic units in Texas
- Paleontology in Texas
- Cretaceous Texas
- Corsicana Marl
- El Picacho Formation
- Escondido Formation
- Kemp Clay
- Nacatoch Sand
- Neylandville Marl
