= Prodesmodon =

Prodesmodon Temporal range: Late Cretaceous, 70.6–63.3 Ma

Scientific classification
- Kingdom: Animalia
- Phylum: Chordata
- Class: Amphibia
- Family: †Batrachosauroididae
- Genus: †Prodesmodon; Estes, 1964

Type species
- Prodesmodon copei Estes, 1964

Synonyms
- Cuttysarkus Estes, 1964

Extinct genus of salamanders

Prodesmodon is an extinct genus of prehistoric salamander, first described from the Lance Formation.

== See also ==
- List of prehistoric amphibian genera
