= Peratosauroides =

Scientific classification
- Kingdom: Animalia
- Phylum: Chordata
- Class: Amphibia
- Family: †Batrachosauroididae
- Genus: †Peratosauroides; Naylor, 1981

Extinct genus of salamanders

Peratosauroides is an extinct genus of prehistoric salamander.

== See also ==
- List of prehistoric amphibian genera
