= Evanston Formation =

Geological formation in Wyoming, USA

Coordinates: 41.8068°N 110.6813°W

- Stratigraphic range: Late Cretaceous to Middle Paleocene; Maastrichtian-Selandian; ~66–59 Ma
- Type: Geological formation

Location
- Region: North America

The Evanston Formation is a geological formation in Wyoming whose strata date back to the Late Cretaceous. Dinosaur remains are among the fossils that have been recovered from the formation. The fossil formation also has the remains of prehistoric mammals from the Paleocene epoch.

== Vertebrate paleofauna ==
- Alamosaurus sp.
- Triceratops horridus
- Insectivora
- Multituberculata
- Primates
- Condylarthra
- Creodonta

== See also ==
- List of dinosaur-bearing rock formations
