= Palaeoproteus =

Palaeoproteus Temporal range: Paleogene, 58.7–40.4 Ma

Scientific classification
- Kingdom: Animalia
- Phylum: Chordata
- Class: Amphibia
- Family: †Batrachosauroididae
- Genus: †Palaeoproteus; Herre, 1935

Species
- Palaeoproteus gallicus Estes et al., 1967; Palaeoproteus klatti Herre 1935

Extinct genus of salamanders

Palaeoproteus is an extinct genus of prehistoric salamanders erected by Wolf Herre in 1935. They have patchy stratigraphic occurrence which is due to their narrow climatic and environmental spaces.

== See also ==
- List of prehistoric amphibian genera
