= Navajovius =

Navajovius Temporal range: Paleocene, 66–56 Ma

Scientific classification
- Kingdom: Animalia
- Phylum: Chordata
- Class: Mammalia
- Order: †Plesiadapiformes
- Family: †Microsyopidae
- Genus: †Navajovius; Matthew & Granger, 1921

Extinct genus of tree-dwelling mammal

Navajovius is an extinct genus of plesiadapiforms that lived during the Paleocene epoch (66 to 56 million years ago). Plesiadapiforms were small, arboreal mammals that are theorized to be either closely related to primates or dermopterans. Navajovius has only been documented from localities within North America. This genus was officially named in 1921 by Walter Granger and William Matthew and the type specimen is housed at the American Museum of Natural History.

== History of discovery ==
Navajovius was first found in 1916 at the Mason Pocket locality outside of Ignacio, Colorado. The type species of this genus is Navajovius kohlhaasae and the type specimen is AMNH 17390, a fragmentary maxilla and lower dentary.

Several more specimens of N. kohlhaasae have been found in the United States, all dating to the Paleocene. One fossil was recovered from the Evanston Formation, Twin Creeks, Wyoming and two more from the Black Peaks Formation, Big Bend National Park, Texas.

Two other Navajovius specimens which have not been formally described, have also been found in the Circle and Olive localities in Montana. These consist of only fragmentary teeth and there is too little information to identify them to the species level.

The phylogenetic placement of one species originally placed within Navajovius has been debated. Navajovius mckennai was originally described in 1969 by Fred Szalay. However, based on newly collected fossil material, Beard and Dawson erected a new genus, Choctawius, that includes the type species, Choctawius foxi, as well as Choctawius mckennai, formerly Navajovius mckennai.

== Etymology ==
The genus Navajovius was named by Matthew and Granger in 1921 for the Navajo Mountains north of the San Juan River, close to the place of its discovery. The species name, N. kohlhaasae, is named in honor of the specimen preparator, Erna Kohlhasse, who cleaned many of the delicate specimens collected from the Mason Pocket Locality.

== Taxonomy ==
Navajovius has had a complicated history of classification since its discovery. Granger and Matthew initially placed it within the family Tarsiidae and was subsequently reassigned into the family Anaptomorphidae and the subfamily Omomyinae. Navajovius has also been placed in the subfamily Uintasoricinae within the family Microsyopidae and into the superfamily Paromomyoidea under the tribe Navajoviini in 1979.

Today, Navajovius is most commonly ascribed to Microsyopidae, a family within the suborder Plesiadapiformes. Of the microsyopids, Navajovius is considered to be more primitive. Navajovius is also classified under the subfamily Navajoviinae which sometimes includes the genus Berruvius. Though the validity of this classification is disputed. There is only one named species under this genus, Navajovius kohlhaasae.

== Description ==
Very few fossils belonging to this genus have been found, limiting the descriptive material to lower jaws, maxillae, and fragmentary teeth (Gunnell 1989). From these remains we can tell that Navajovius was quite small, with an estimated body mass of four grams.

The dental formula of Navajovius is greatly debated. The lower dental formula has been suggested to be 2-1-2-3, 1-1-3-3, 1-0-3-3, and 1-0-4-3. A gap between the anterior dentition and cheek teeth is considered to be a space for the canine by some and a diastema by others, accounting for some of this disagreement.

There are a few dental morphologies that are agreed upon. The first incisor is somewhat enlarged, procumbent and lanceolate in shape. The third premolar has a double root and is relatively smaller than both the second and fourth premolar. The fourth premolar lacks a metacone and the paraconid is weak. The lower molars have distinct, reduced paraconids and the third molar is reduced in size.

Most researchers agree that the second incisor is absent, the second premolar is single rooted, and that the fourth premolar is molariform in shape. The presence of the upper and lower canine is also debated. While most researchers include the lower canine in the dental formula, some suggest that it is absent all together. The presence of a vestigial upper canine has been suggested to be present as well. Based on its morphology and age range, Navajovius is sometimes suggested to be one of the more primitive microsyopids.

== Paleobiology ==
=== Habitat and range ===
Fossils of Navajovius have been found in several places in the western United States. N. kohlhaasae has been found in Colorado, Texas, and Wyoming. If the two unnamed specimens are included, the range can be pushed further north into Montana. All of these localities are considered to be from the Tiffanian North American Land Mammal Age (NALMA) and date back to the late Paleocene Epoch, about 61.7 to 56.8 million years ago. As plesiadapiforms are largely thought to be arboreal, it can be assumed that the western United States was covered in forests during this time. Notes on the collection found in the Mason Pocket locality in Colorado, where the holotype for N. kohlhaasae was found, indicates that the majority of the fauna found there were arboreal. As there are currently no postcranial remains from Navajovius, there can be no analysis of locomotor behavior for this taxon.

=== Diet ===
Based on dental morphology, Navajovius most likely had a generalized diet, eating a variety of foods possibly including insects, fruits, and tree sap. The shape of their incisors and other anterior teeth suggest that they functioned for slicing and shearing.
