= Sauropod hiatus =

Absence of sauropods in the fossil record

The sauropod hiatus is a geological period in the North American dinosaur fossil record for most of the Late Cretaceous noted for its lack of remains of sauropod dinosaurs. It may represent an extinction event, possibly caused by competition with ornithischian herbivores, habitat loss from the expansion of the Western Interior Seaway, or both. Alternatively, it has been argued that the hiatus represents a decrease in inland deposits that would have effectively preserved the animals, creating the illusion of an extinction. The sauropod hiatus ended shortly before the end of the Cretaceous, with the appearance of Alamosaurus, most likely an immigrant from South America, in the southwestern parts of North America.

== History of the concept ==
Definite evidence of Late Cretaceous sauropods in North America was first discovered in 1922, when Charles Whitney Gilmore described Alamosaurus sanjuanensis. The term "sauropod hiatus" was coined by researchers Spencer G. Lucas and Adrian P. Hunt in 1989 to describe how fossils of the clade become scarce in western North America near the beginning of the Late Cretaceous. Another gap in the North American sauropod record was noted in the Early Cretaceous, from the Berriasian to the Barremian, but this gap was partially filled by the discovery of fragmentary remains of a Camarasaurus-like sauropod from the Lakota Formation in 2014. The fossil record of sauropods in this part of the Early Cretaceous is poor globally, not only in North America.

== Background ==
Around the end of the Early Jurassic, sauropods, a clade of large, long-necked dinosaurs, established themselves as the "dominant group" of large herbivores in land-based environments, possibly following a global warming event. They achieved global distribution, becoming a significant and diverse component of Mesozoic ecosystems. Sauropods were highly successful in North America during the Late Jurassic; the Morrison Formation of the western United States preserves one of the best-known of all sauropod faunas, with 24 recognized sauropod species. The fossil record of North American sauropods is poor for the first half of the Early Cretaceous, but later in the Early Cretaceous, several lineages of sauropod are known from North America, including turiasaurs such as Moabosaurus, brachiosaurids such as Cedarosaurus, and somphospondyls such as Astrophocaudia.

== Beginning of the hiatus ==
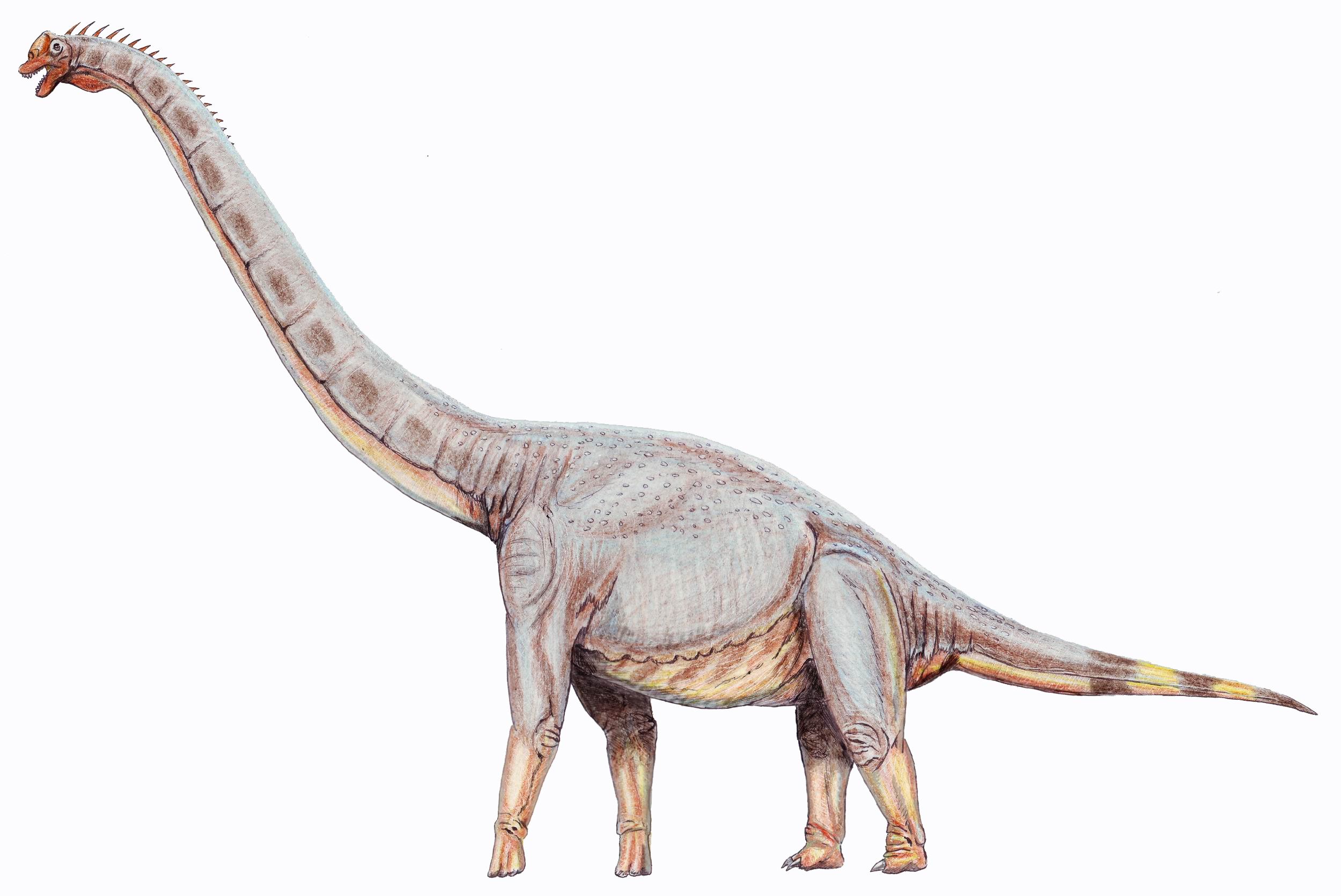
Sonorasaurus thompsoni, one of the last North American sauropods before the hiatus

The North American sauropod hiatus began during the Cenomanian, the first age of the Late Cretaceous. Several sauropods are known from the upper Albian or lower Cenomanian of North America. The brachiosaurid Abydosaurus and indeterminate sauropod teeth have been found in the Mussentuchit Member, with the maximum age of the Abydosaurus fossils calculated to be 104.46±0.95 Ma. The age of the brachiosaurid Sonorasaurus is not well-constrained, but probably was between 98 and 110 Ma. Sauropod bones have been reported from the Dakota Formation. Remains possibly referable to Sauroposeidon have been found in strata with a maximal age calculated to be 104.4 Ma.

The species epithet of Sauroposeidon proteles means "perfected before the end" in reference to its status as one of the last North American sauropods before the sauropod hiatus.

== Possible causes ==
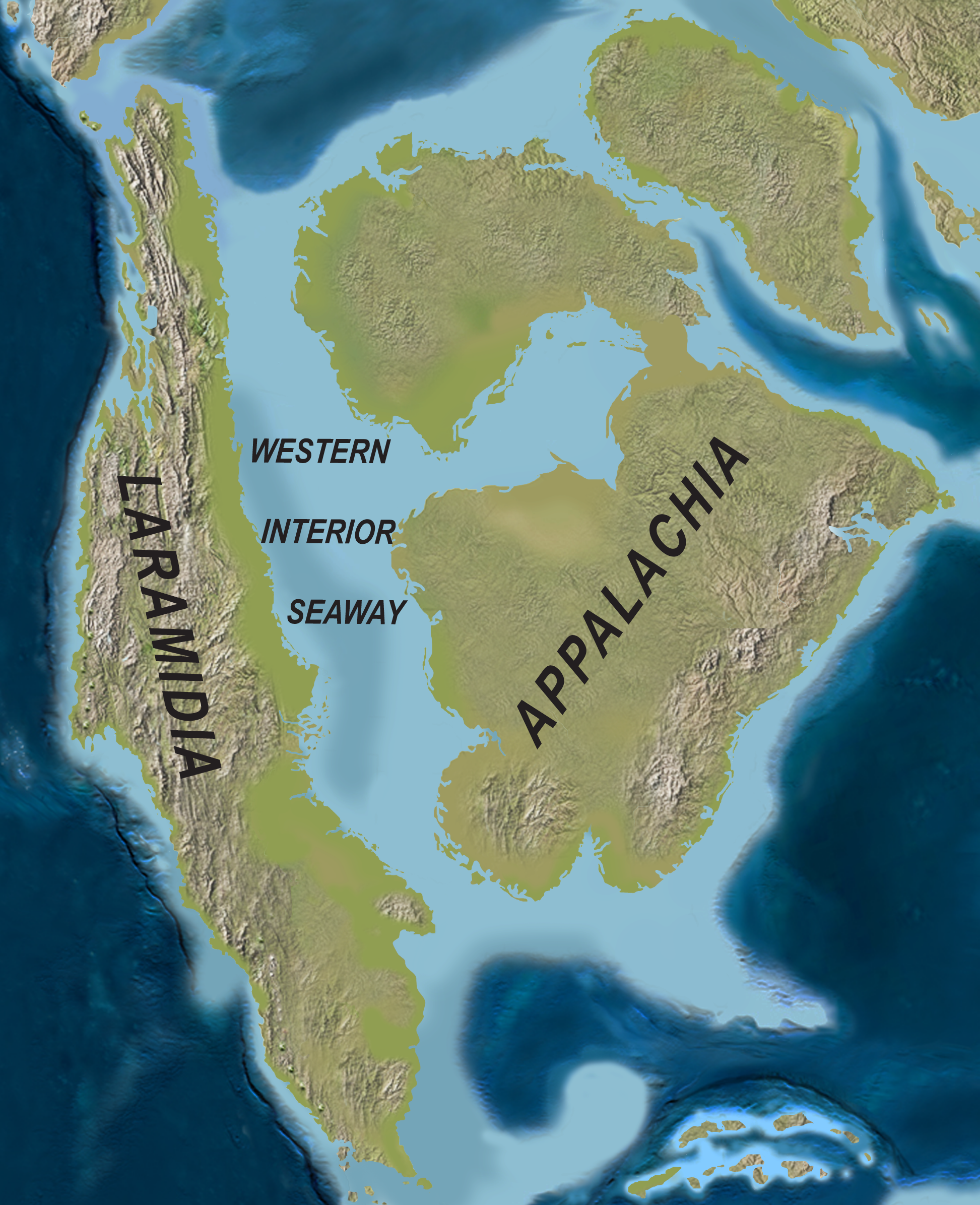
The growth of the Western Interior Seaway (pictured here during the Campanian) could have led to a decline in North American sauropods.

The cause of the sauropod hiatus has been a subject of debate. Lucas and Hunt proposed two hypotheses: a lack of properly preserved remains or a genuine extinction followed by re-population from South America. In the first scenario—rejected by Lucas and Hunt themselves but later further explained by Thomas Lehman in 2001—as sea levels rose, the sauropods became restricted to upland environments that were not as well represented in fossil record as coastal ones, before eventually migrating back to lowland areas as they became more suitable. In the second, the North American sauropods became extinct, and those that appear near the end of the Cretaceous represent immigrants from South America via land bridges, belonging to a group known as titanosaurians.

In 2011, Philip D. Mannion and Paul Upchurch re-evaluated the sauropod hiatus, taking numerous factors into account. They argued that the event represented sampling bias, as the sauropods' preferred inland habitat is not as well represented in the fossil record as coastal regions, also claiming that the existence of Cenomanian-aged Sonorasaurus thompsoni shortened the gap to the Turonian–early Campanian.

However, in 2012, Michael D. D'Emic and Brady Z. Foreman countered the analysis of Mannion and Upchurch. They cited a recent cladistic analysis of Sauroposeidon, which found it to be a type of somphospondylan, as evidence that titanosaurians had not been present in North America before the Maastrichtian, supporting a recent migration, also questioning claims of earlier North American titanosaurs. They further explained issues with the dates of the previous study; for instance Sonorasaurus thompsoni, provided as an example of a sauropod present during the hiatus by Mannion and Upchurch, was originally named as either Albian or Cenomanian in age when described, contrary to claims by Mannion and Upchurch that it was Cenomanian. Even assuming that the dates of the 2011 study were correct, D'Emic and Foreman pointed out that the hiatus would still last from the mid-Cenomanian to the mid-Campanian. As for potential sampling bias, they explained how other groups of dinosaurs from the same areas as sauropods persist into the Late Cretaceous, while members of the clade itself disappear at around 98 Mya.

D'Emic and Foreman discussed multiple events that could have led to a regional extinction. In the late Albian, the Western Interior Seaway began to push further into North America. In contrast to an earlier argument by Mannion and Upchurch that this event took place before the sauropod hiatus, D'Emic and Foreman write that it occurred gradually over millions of years. According to them, this occurred either before or concurrently with the event. Alternatively, in a scenario doubted by Lucas and Hunt but taken into further consideration by D'Emic and Foreman, hadrosaurs (duck-billed dinosaurs) could have out-competed sauropods. While the former pair believed that the two groups' feeding methods were too different for this to occur, the latter researchers suggested that such competition could have been between animals at younger stages of growth. This scenario is also supported by the fossil record, as the last pre-hiatus sauropods are found alongside the first North American hadrosauroids.

== End of the hiatus ==
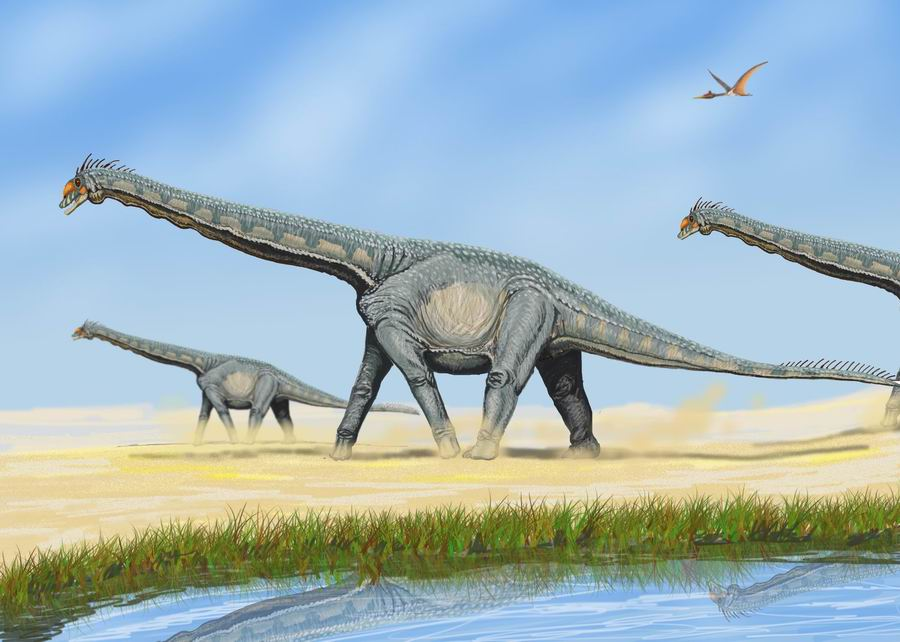
Artist's impression of Alamosaurus, the only known post-hiatus sauropod of North America

Whatever the cause of the sauropod hiatus, sauropods do not reappear in the North American fossil record until near the end of the Cretaceous. Various specimens have been claimed to represent Campanian records of sauropods in North America, but have since been re-dated as Maastrichtian or reinterpreted as representing other groups of animals. Some of these claimed records have been determined to be hadrosaur cervical vertebrae, which can superficially resemble titanosaur caudal vertebrae if poorly preserved and interpreted back-to-front. Sauropods do not definitely reappear in the North American fossil record until the Maastrichtian, the last age of the Cretaceous, although an unpublished study presented at the Society of Vertebrate Paleontology conference in 2018 reported the occurrence of a sauropod caudal vertebra in the Deadhorse Coulee Member of the Milk River Formation, dating to the Santonian. If confirmed, it would represent the northernmost occurrence of a sauropod in Late Cretaceous North America, as well as provide evidence against the sauropod hiatus. The post-hiatus sauropod records of North America are all titanosaurs, and are commonly considered to represent a single genus, Alamosaurus. Alamosaurus appears to have rapidly become the dominant large herbivore of southern North America. Due to its large size, Alamosaurus has been suggested to have contributed to the evolution of gigantism in North American tyrannosaurids such as Tyrannosaurus, with which it lived alongside.

Alamosaurus probably reached North America by crossing over from South America. Other studies have viewed the idea that Alamosaurus could have crossed over from South America skeptically, as the only connection between the Americas at the time may have been island chains that titanosaurs would have been poorly suited to cross, and proposed that Alamosaurus reached North America from Asia instead. However, this hypothesis is based on studies that did not include Alamosaurus's South American close relative Pellegrinisaurus. Sauropods have been considered poorly adapted for high-latitude environments, which would have made the Bering land bridge between Asia and North America inhospitable for titanosaurs. The first appearance of hadrosaurs in South America coincides with the first appearance of titanosaurs in North America, suggesting that titanosaurs may have dispersed north along the same routes as hadrosaurs dispersed south. It has also been proposed that Alamosaurus belongs to a lineage of titanosaurs native to North America, but no other known North American sauropod is closely related to Alamosaurus, rendering such a possibility unlikely.

== Outside of North America ==
Though the "sauropod hiatus" originally referred to a North American absence of sauropods, a similar trend has been noted in Europe, lasting from the late Coniacian to the Santonian. The European gap was discussed in a similar manner by Éric Buffetaut and Jean Le Loeuff in multiple 1990s studies. Buffetaut and Loeuff suggested that this European hiatus reflected an extinction of sauropods in Europe, suggesting that new migrants eventually arrived from Africa. Mannion and Upchurch could not prove an African birthplace for European titanosaurs, although they stated Southern Hemispheric ancestry for certain groups to be a possibility. Due to the scarcity of fossil deposits from the European sauropod hiatus, Le Loeuff considered the existence of such a hiatus tentative. Trackways and a sauropod tooth have been found in Europe during the supposed hiatus, suggesting that sauropods were present in Europe throughout the Late Cretaceous, though their fossils are very rare.

== See also ==
- Romer's gap
