= Opisthotriton =

Opisthotriton Temporal range: Campanian-Lancian ~84–64 Ma

Scientific classification
- Kingdom: Animalia
- Phylum: Chordata
- Class: Amphibia
- Family: †Batrachosauroididae
- Genus: †Opisthotriton; Auffenberg, 1961

Species
- O. kayi Auffenberg, 1961; O. gidleyi Sullivan, 1991

Extinct genus of salamanders

Opisthotriton is an extinct genus of prehistoric salamanders that lived in North America between at least the Upper Cretaceous and the Paleocene.

== See also ==
- List of prehistoric amphibians
