= Hoplochelys =

Hoplochelys Temporal range: Late Cretaceous Late Cretaceous

Scientific classification
- Domain: Eukaryota
- Kingdom: Animalia
- Phylum: Chordata
- Class: Reptilia
- Order: Testudines
- Suborder: Cryptodira
- Family: Kinosternidae
- Genus: †Hoplochelys; Hay, 1908

Extinct genus of turtles

Hoplochelys is an extinct genus of kinosternoid.
