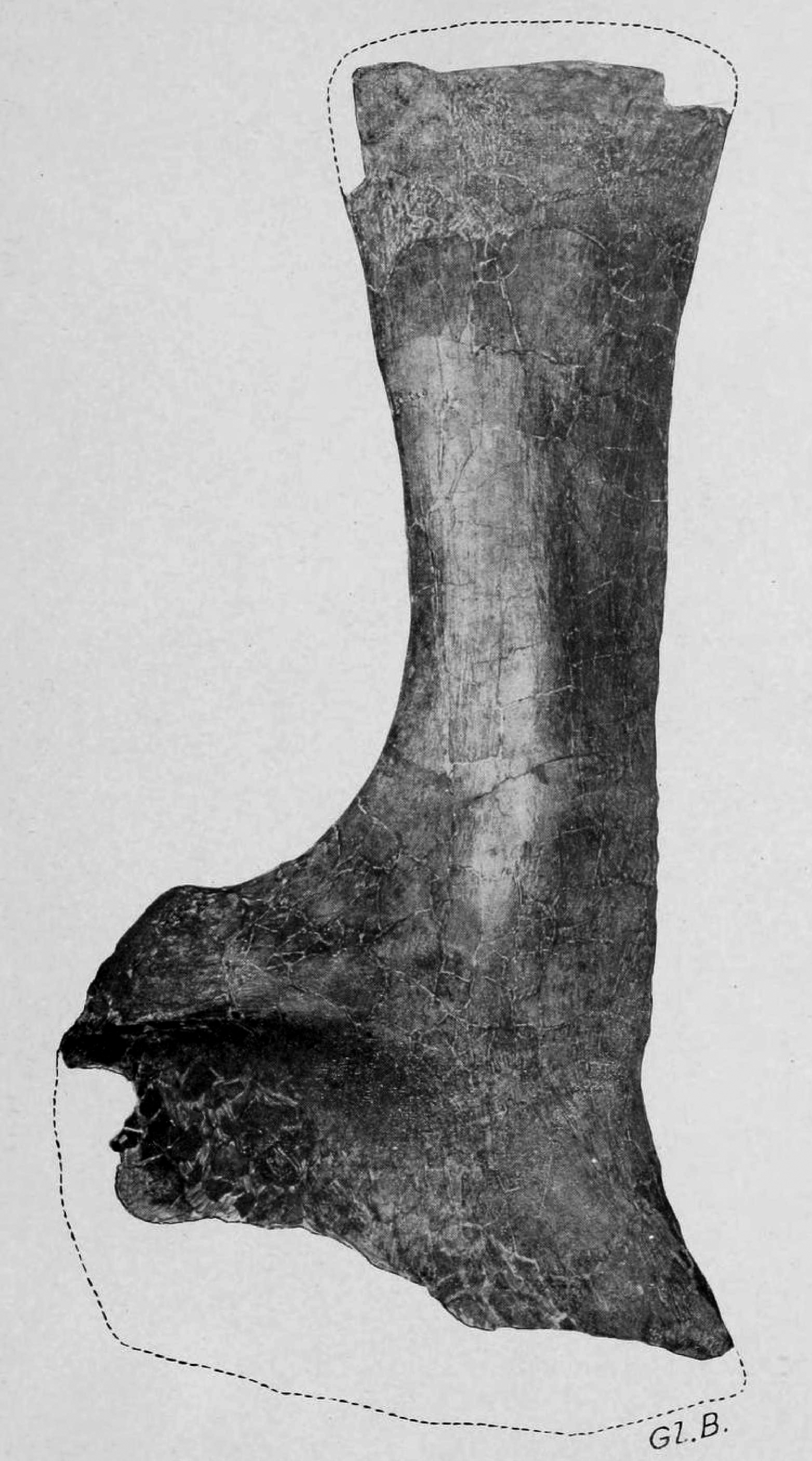
- Holotype scapula

Scientific classification
- Kingdom: Animalia
- Phylum: Chordata
- Class: Reptilia
- Clade: Dinosauria
- Clade: Saurischia
- Clade: †Sauropodomorpha
- Clade: †Sauropoda
- Clade: †Eusauropoda
- Clade: †Macronaria
- Clade: †Titanosauria
- Family: †Saltasauridae
- Subfamily: †Opisthocoelicaudiinae
- Genus: †Alamosaurus; Gilmore, 1922

Type species
- †Alamosaurus sanjuanensis Gilmore, 1922

= Alamosaurus =

Alamosaurus Temporal range: Late Cretaceous (Maastrichtian), 68–66 Ma

Extinct genus of dinosaurs

Alamosaurus (/ˌæləmoʊˈsɔːrəs/; meaning "Ojo Alamo lizard") is a genus of titanosaurian sauropod dinosaurs containing a single known species, Alamosaurus sanjuanensis, from the Maastrichtian age of the Late Cretaceous period in what is now southwestern North America. It is one of the only known sauropods to have inhabited North America after the nearly 30-million-year absence of sauropods from the continent's fossil record ("sauropod hiatus") and probably represents an immigrant from South America or Asia.

Adults would have measured around 26 metres (85 ft) long, 5 metres (16 ft) tall at the shoulder and weighed up to 30–35 tonnes (33–39 short tons), though some specimens indicate a larger body size. Isolated vertebrae and limb bones suggest that it could have reached sizes comparable to Argentinosaurus and Puertasaurus, which would make it the absolute largest dinosaur known from North America. Its fossils have been recovered from a variety of rock formations in the southwestern United States that were dated to the latest Maastrichtian age.

== History of discovery ==
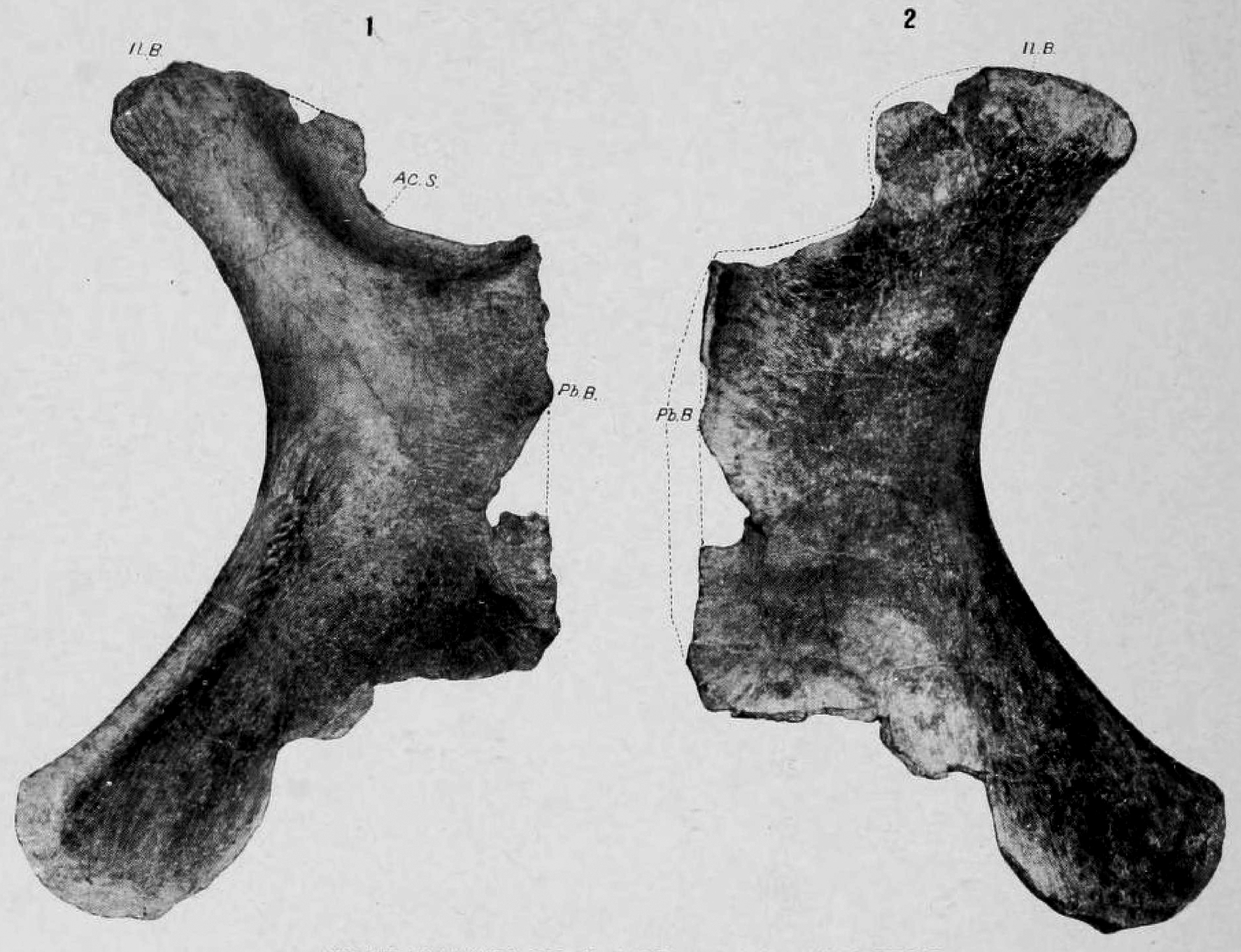
Paratype ischium

Alamosaurus remains have been discovered throughout the southwestern United States. The holotype was discovered in June 1921 by Charles Whitney Gilmore, John Bernard Reeside, and Charles Hazelius Sternberg at the Barrel Springs Arroyo in the Naashoibito Member of the Ojo Alamo Formation (or Kirtland Formation under a different definition) of New Mexico. This formation was deposited during the latest Maastrichtian age of the late Cretaceous period, making the Alamosaurus holotype specimen one of the geologically youngest specimens of this species. Fossils recovered from other Maastrichtian formations have also been referred to Alamosaurus, like the North Horn Formation of Utah, the Black Peaks and the Javelina Formations of Texas, though these specimens may represent a distinct genus. Undescribed titanosaur fossils closely associated with Alamosaurus have been found in the Evanston Formation in Wyoming. Three articulated caudal vertebrae were collected above Hams Fork and have been said to be housed at the Museum of Paleontology, University of California, Berkeley and have not been described. Fossils of an unknown titanosaur closely related to Alamosaurus have been collected from northeastern Chihuahua, Mexico. One of the large vertebrae resembles those of the latter. This specimen may be the first record of this genus from Mexico.

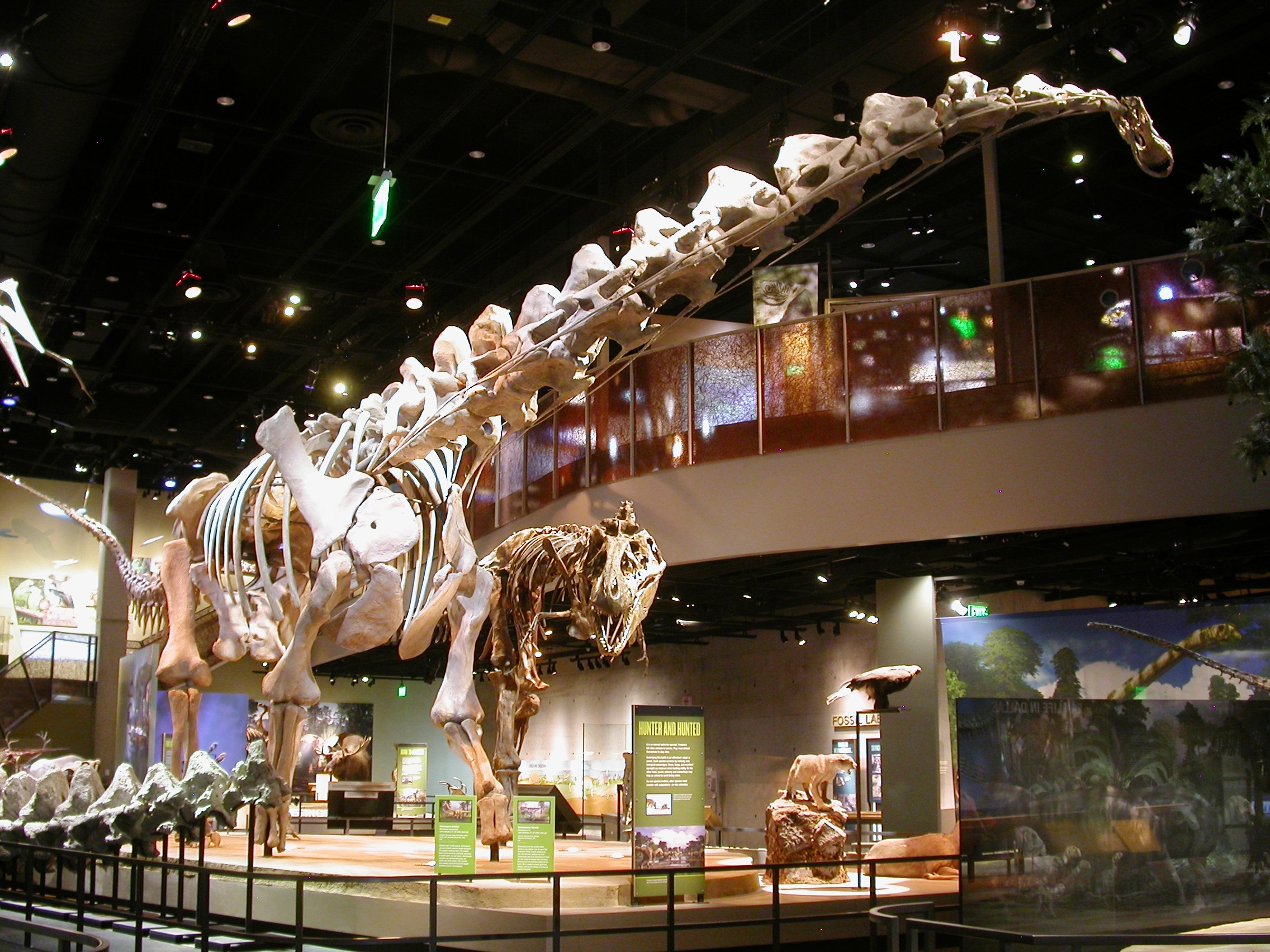
Reconstructed skeleton of Alamosaurus at the Perot Museum, based on a composite of several North American titanosaur specimens

Smithsonian paleontologist Gilmore originally described holotype USNM 10486, a left scapula (shoulder bone), and the paratype USNM 10487, a right ischium (pelvic bone) in 1922, naming the type species Alamosaurus sanjuanensis. Contrary to popular assertions, the dinosaur is not named after the Alamo in San Antonio, Texas, or the battle that was fought there. The holotype, the specimen the name was based on, was discovered in New Mexico and, at the time of its naming, Alamosaurus had not yet been found in Texas. Instead, the name Alamosaurus comes from Ojo Alamo, the geologic formation in which it was found and which was, in turn, named after the nearby Ojo Alamo trading post. Since this time, there has been some debate as to whether to reclassify the Alamosaurus-bearing rocks as belonging to the Kirtland Formation or if they should remain in the Ojo Alamo Formation. The term alamo itself is a Spanish word meaning "poplar" and is used for the local subspecies of cottonwood tree. The term saurus is derived from saura (σαυρα), the Greek word for "lizard", and is the most common suffix used in dinosaur names. There is only one species in the genus, Alamosaurus sanjuanensis, which is named after San Juan County, New Mexico, where the first remains were found.

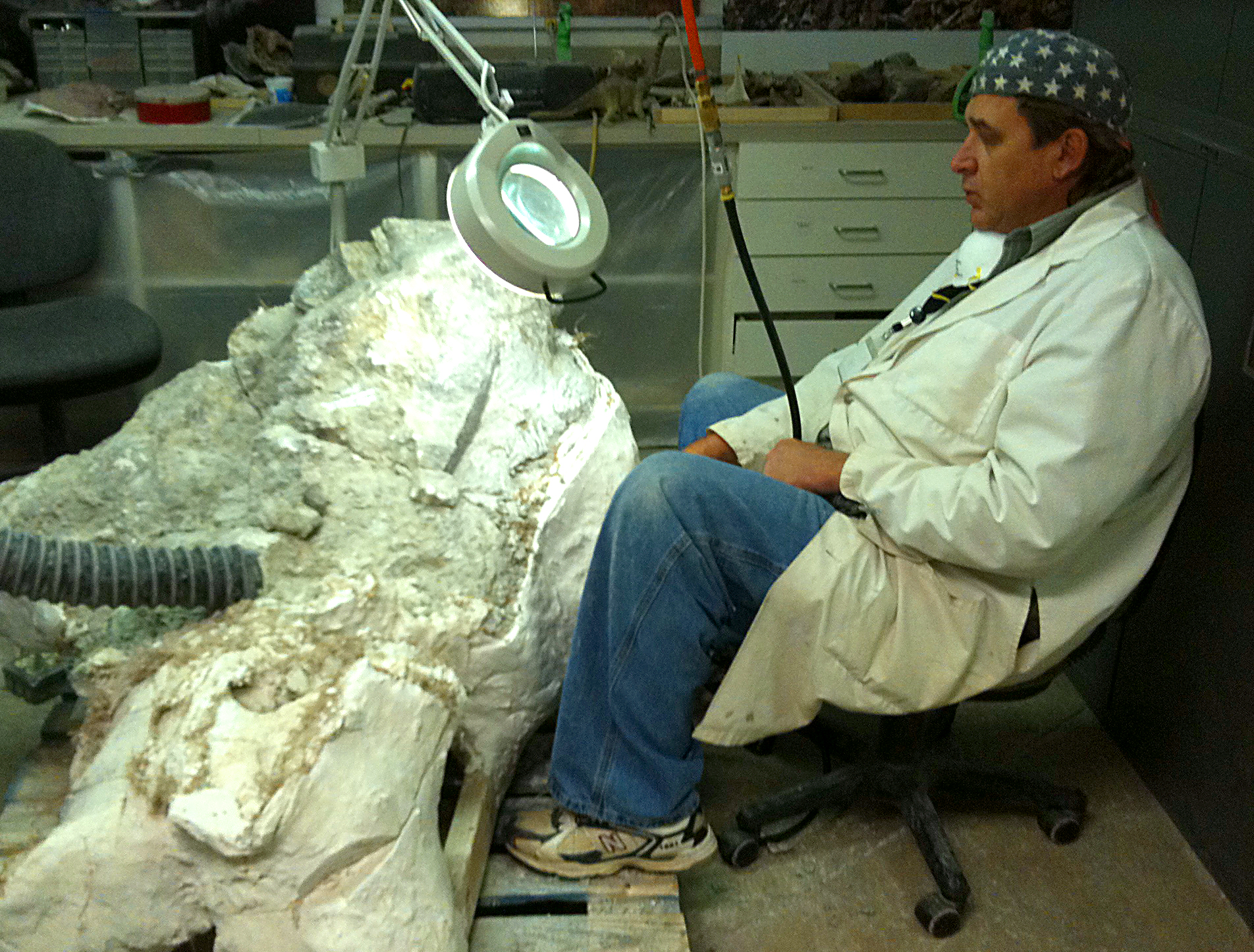
Preparator working on Alamosaurus vertebra at Perot Museum

In 1946, Gilmore posthumously described a more complete specimen, USNM 15560, found on June 15, 1937, on the North Horn Mountain of Utah by George B. Pearce. It consists of a complete tail, a complete right forelimb (except for the fingers, which later research showed do not ossify with Titanosauridae), and both ischia. Since the description of USNM 15560, hundreds of other bits and pieces from Texas, New Mexico, and Utah have been referred to Alamosaurus, often without much description. Despite being fragmentary, until the second half of the twentieth century they, represented much of the globally known titanosaurian material. The most completely known specimen, TxVP 43621–1, is a juvenile skeleton from Texas which allowed educated estimates of length and mass. In 2015, Carrano and D'Emic described the presence of multiple osteoderms associated with USNM 15560. In 2025, Gregory S. Paul assigned USNM 15560 as the holotype of the new taxon Utetitan zellaguymondeweyae, and referred other specimens from the North Horn Formation, the Black Peaks Formation and possibly the Javelina Formation to it.

The restored Alamosaurus skeletal mount at the Perot Museum was based on a composite of several titanosaur specimens found in Late Cretaceous rocks of North America. One of these, an articulated series of nine cervical vertebrae, was discovered in 1997 when student Dana Biasatti, a member of an excavation team at a nearby site, went on a hike to search for more dinosaur bones in the area. Other bones included in this reconstruction are the forelimbs and tail of USNM 15560 (now the holotype of Utetitan zellaguymondeweyae), and the torso, pelvis, and hindlimbs of TxVP 41541-1.

== Description ==
Size of North American titanosaur specimens compared to a human, including the Alamosaurus (third silhouette) and Utetitan (second silhouette) holotypes

Alamosaurus was a gigantic quadrupedal herbivore with a long neck, a long tail, relatively long limbs and a body partly covered with bony armor. It would have measured around 26 metres (85 ft) long, 5 metres (16 ft) tall at the shoulder and weighed up to 30–35 tonnes (33–39 short tons) based on known adult specimens including TxVP 41541-1.

Some scientists suggest larger size estimates for the largest adults. Thomas Holtz proposed a maximum length of around 30 meters (98 ft) or more and an approximate weight of 72.5–80 tonnes (80–88 short tons) or more. Though most of the complete remains come from juvenile or small adult specimens, three fragmentary specimens (SMP VP−1625, SMP VP−1850, and SMP VP−2104) suggest that adult Alamosaurus could have grown to enormous sizes comparable to the largest known dinosaurs, like Argentinosaurus, which has been estimated to weigh 73 metric tons (80 short tons). Scott Hartman estimates Alamosaurus, based on a huge incomplete tibia that probably refers to it, being slightly shorter at 28–30 m (92–98 ft) and equal in weight to other massive titanosaurs, such as Argentinosaurus and Puertasaurus, though he states that scientists do not know whether the massive tibia belongs to an Alamosaurus or a completely new species of sauropod.

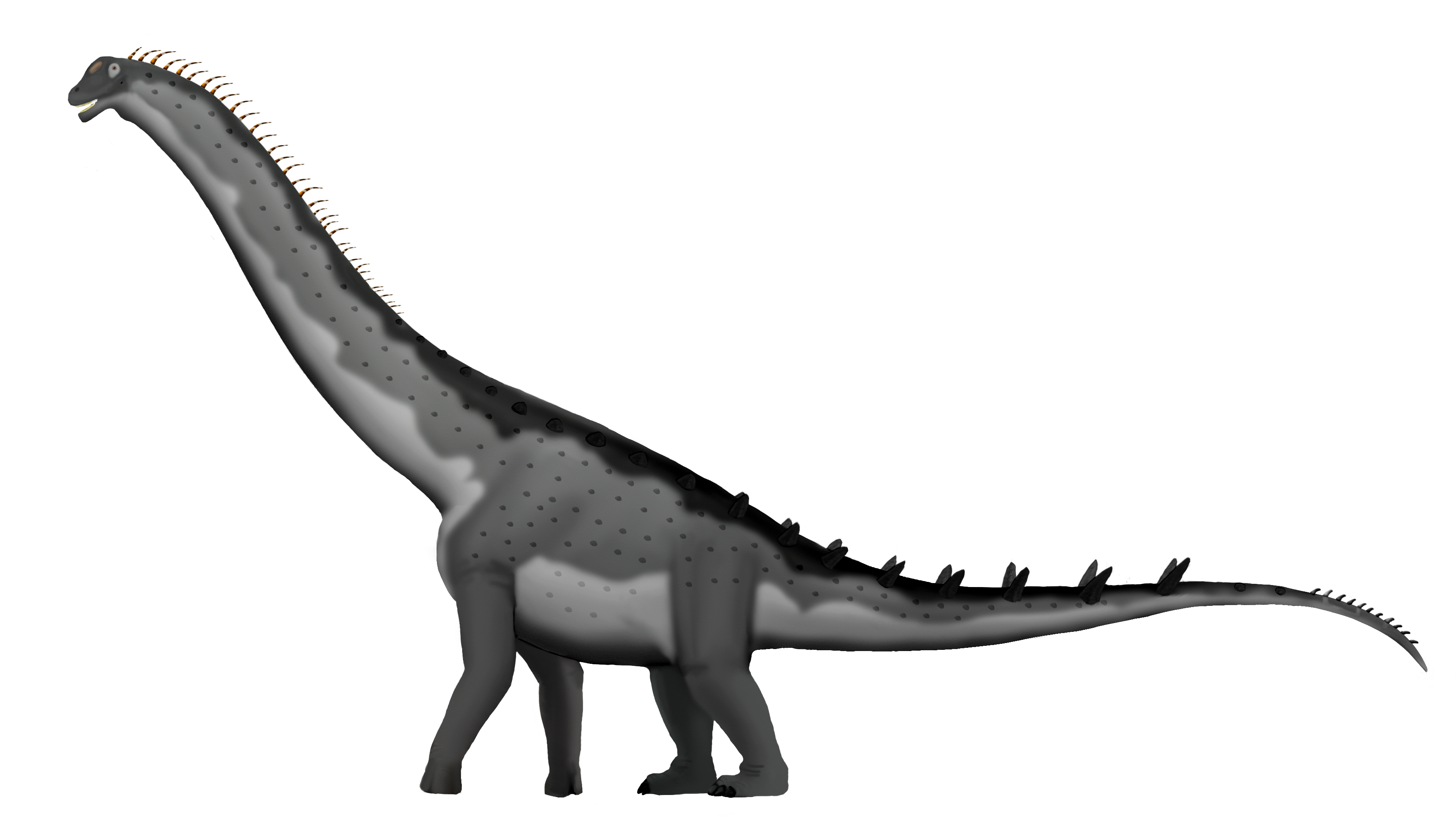
Speculative life restoration

Though no skull has ever been found, rod-shaped teeth have been found with Alamosaurus skeletons and probably belonged to this dinosaur. The vertebrae from the middle part of its tail had elongated centra. Alamosaurus had vertebral lateral fossae that resembled shallow depressions; fossae that similarly resemble shallow depressions are known from Saltasaurus, Malawisaurus, Aeolosaurus, and Gondwanatitan. Venenosaurus also had depression-like fossae, but its "depressions" penetrated deeper into the vertebrae, were divided into two chambers, and extend farther into the vertebral columns. Uniquely among titanosaurs, the ribs of Alamosaurus are pneumatised for two-thirds of the rib length; other titanosaurs had proximal rib ends, but in no other taxon did the pneumaticity extend as far as it did in Alamosaurus. Alamosaurus had more robust radii than Venenosaurus. The complete femur that was assigned to Alamosaurus is 1.61 metres (5.3 ft) long. A fibula 1.4 metres (4.6 ft) in length from the North Horn Formation may belong to this genus, though it cannot be referred with certainty since it is now lost.

In 2008, Lehman and Woodward estimated that Alamosaurus would have reached a body mass of over 32,000 kg (70,500 lb) within 45 years, growing up to 1,000 kg (2,200 lb) per year. Lehman and Woodward estimated that the growth lines of Alamosaurus were drawn at 4–12 years, and the maximum age of Alamosaurus was 55 years for the age at 90% of the mass. The age shown in the growth increase table was estimated to be 60 years. Trackways show that Alamosaurus walked slowly at speeds of 3.2–4 kilometers per hour (2.0–2.5 mph) without dragging their tails.

== Classification ==
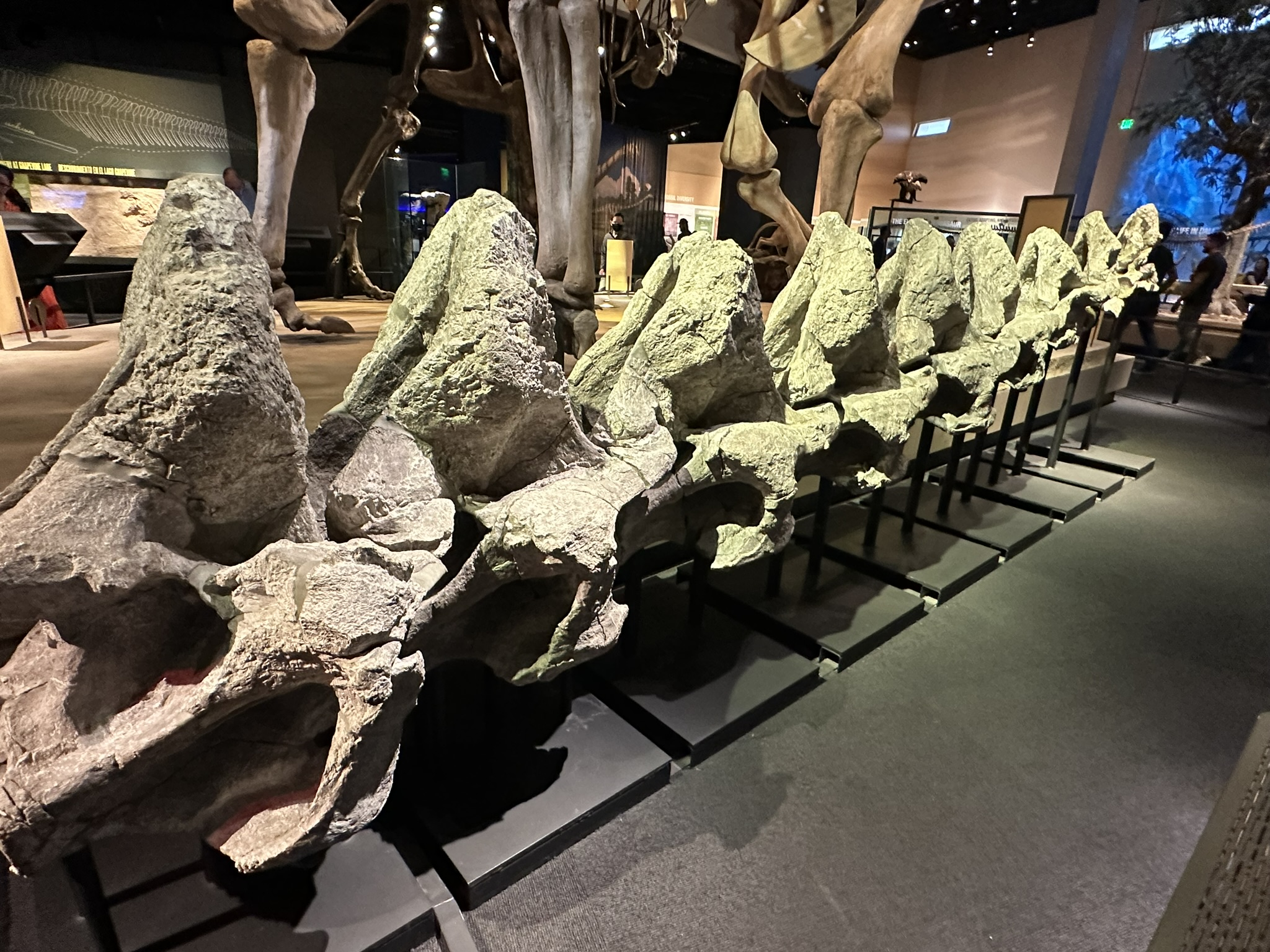
A set of fossil Alamosaurus vertebrae, Perot Museum

In 1922, Gilmore was uncertain about the precise affinities of Alamosaurus and did not determine it any further than a general Sauropoda. In 1927, Friedrich von Huene placed it in Titanosauridae.

Alamosaurus was, in any case, an advanced and derived member of the group Titanosauria, but its relationships within that group are far from certain. The issue is further complicated by some researchers rejecting the name Titanosauridae and replacing it with Saltasauridae. One major analysis unites Alamosaurus with Opisthocoelicaudia in the subgroup Opisthocoelicaudiinae of Saltasauridae. A major competing analysis finds Alamosaurus as a sister taxon to Pellegrinisaurus, with both genera located just outside Saltasauridae. Studies finding a close relationship between Alamosaurus and Opisthocoelicaudia did not include Pellegrinisaurus in their analyses. Other scientists have also noted particular similarities with the saltasaurid Neuquensaurus and Trigonosaurus, which is used in many cladistic and morphologic analyses of titanosaurians. An analysis published in 2016 by Anthony Fiorillo and Ron Tykoski indicates that Alamosaurus was a sister taxon to Lognkosauria and therefore to species such as Futalognkosaurus and Mendozasaurus, laying outside Saltasauridae (possibly being descended from close relations to the Saltasauridae), based on synapomorphies of cervical vertebral morphologies and two cladistic analyses. The same study also suggests that the ancestors of Alamosaurus hailed from South America instead of Asia. The position of Alamosaurus recovered by phylogenetic analyses varies. Alamosaurus has been recovered as an opisthocoelicaudiine, saltasaurine, or outside of Saltasauridae entirely.

In 2022, Navarro and colleagues included Alamosaurus in their phylogenetic analysis of titanosaurs. Their results placed BIBE 45854, a series of neck vertebrae traditionally assigned to Alamosaurus, in a position distantly related to Alamosaurus itself; the vertebrae were recovered within the Lognkosauria, while Alamosaurus was recovered as a member of the Saltasauridae, as the sister taxon to Baurutitan:

- Titanosauria
  - Andesaurus
  - Lithostrotia
    - Malawisaurus
    - - Paludititan
      - - Epachthosaurus
        - Kaijutitan
        - - - Argentinosaurus
            - Patagotitan
          - - Bonitasaura
            - - Colossosauria
                - Lognkosauria
                  - BIBE 45854 (cf. Alamosaurus)
                  - Futalognkosaurus
                  - - Austroposeidon
                    - Mendozasaurus
                - - Rinconsauria
                  - - Notocolossus
                    - Puertasaurus
              - - Dreadnoughtus
                - Saltasauroidea
                  - Diamantinasauria
                  - - - Isisaurus
                      - Rapetosaurus
                    - - Tapuiasaurus
                      - Saltasauridae
                        - Opisthocoelicaudiinae
                          - Opisthocoelicaudia
                          - Nemegtosaurus
                        - Saltasaurinae
                          - - Alamosaurus
                            - Baurutitan
                          - - - Ibirania
                              - - Bonatitan
                                - Rocasaurus
                            - Saltasaurini
                              - Neuquensaurus
                              - - MACN-PV-RN 233 (Angostura Colorada Fm. taxon)
                                - Saltasaurus

=== Paleogeography ===
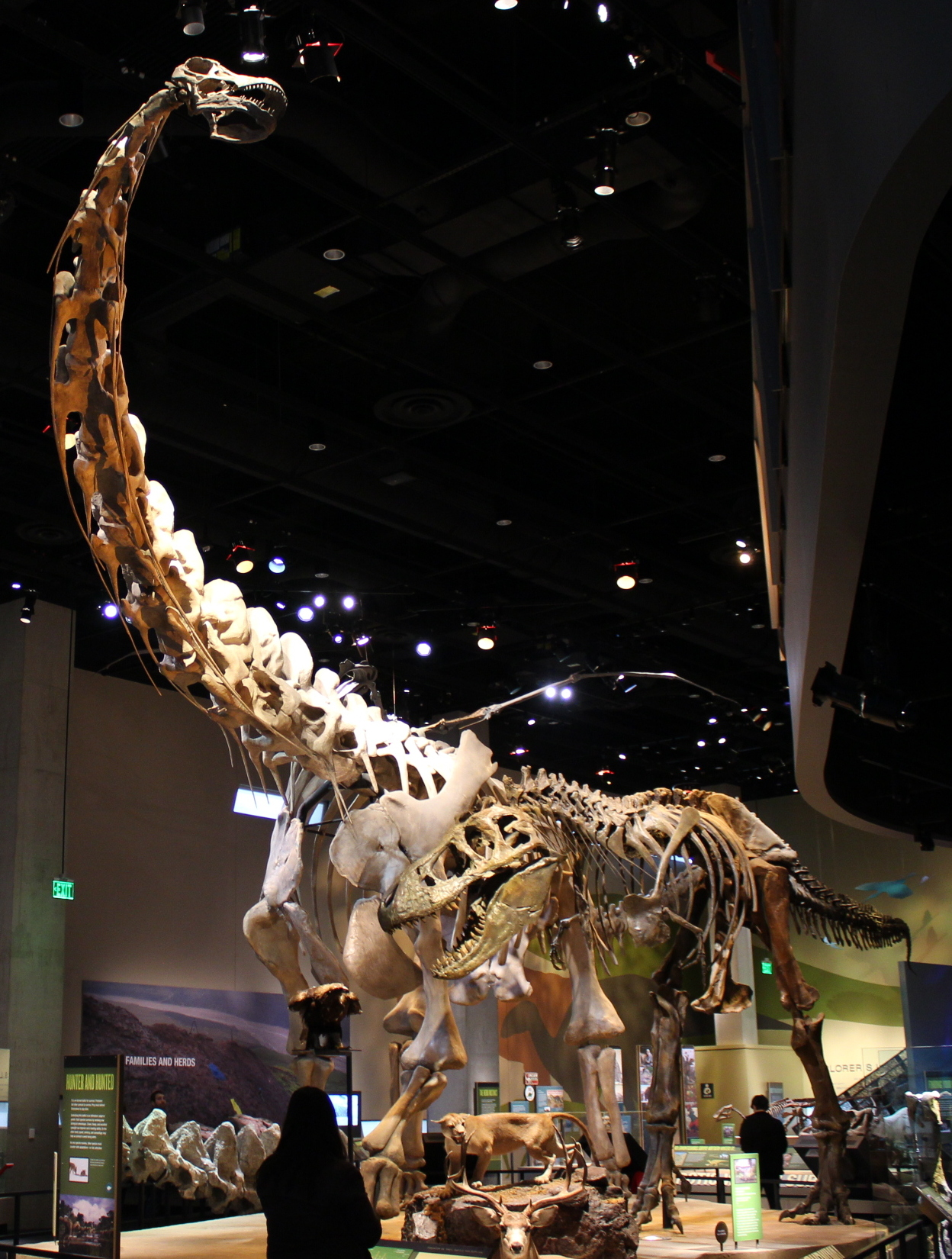
Restored skeletons of Alamosaurus and Tyrannosaurus at the Perot Museum

Alamosaurus is the only known sauropod to have lived in North America after the sauropod hiatus, a nearly 30-million-year interval for which no definite sauropod fossils are known from the continent. The earliest fossils of Alamosaurus date to the Maastrichtian age, around 70 million years ago, and it rapidly became the dominant large herbivore of southern Laramidia.

The origins of Alamosaurus are highly controversial, with three hypotheses that have been proposed. The first of these, which has been termed the "austral immigrant" scenario, proposes that Alamosaurus is descended from South American titanosaurs. Alamosaurus is closely related to South American titanosaurs, such as Pellegrinisaurus. Alamosaurus appears in North America at the same time that hadrosaurs closely related to North American species first appear in South America, suggesting that the Alamosaurus lineage crossed into North America on the same routes as hadrosaurs crossed into South America. The austral immigrant hypothesis has been challenged on the grounds that the routes connecting North and South America during the Maastrichtian may have consisted of separate islands, which would have presented challenges to the dispersal of titanosaurs.

A second scenario, termed the "inland herbivore" scenario, suggests that titanosaurs were present in North America throughout the Late Cretaceous and that their apparent absence reflects the relative rarity of fossil sites preserving the upland environments that titanosaurs favored, rather than their true absence from the continent. However, there is no evidence for sauropods in North America between the mid-Cenomanian and the early Maastrichtian, even in strata that preserve more upland environments, and the sauropods that lived in North America before the hiatus are basal titanosauriforms, such as Sonorasaurus and Sauroposeidon, not lithostrotian titanosaurs. A third option is that, as in the austral immigrant scenario, Alamosaurus is not native to North America, but originated in Asia instead of South America. Alamosaurus is commonly considered to be closely related to the Asian titanosaur Opisthocoelicaudia, but this is based on analyses that did not take Alamosaurus's South American relative Pellegrinisaurus into account. Though many dinosaurs crossed between Asia and North America across the Bering land bridge, sauropods were poorly adapted for high-latitude environments and Beringia would have been an inhospitable environment for titanosaurs. Furthermore, in order to reach southern Laramidia from Asia, Alamosaurus would have had to cross through Northern Laramidia, which contains no known sauropod fossils of comparable age to Alamosaurus, despite containing the best-studied dinosaur faunas on the continent. Overall, a South American origin has been favored by several studies and Chiarenza et al. (2022) regarded it as "the only viable origin" for Alamosaurus.

== Paleoenvironment ==
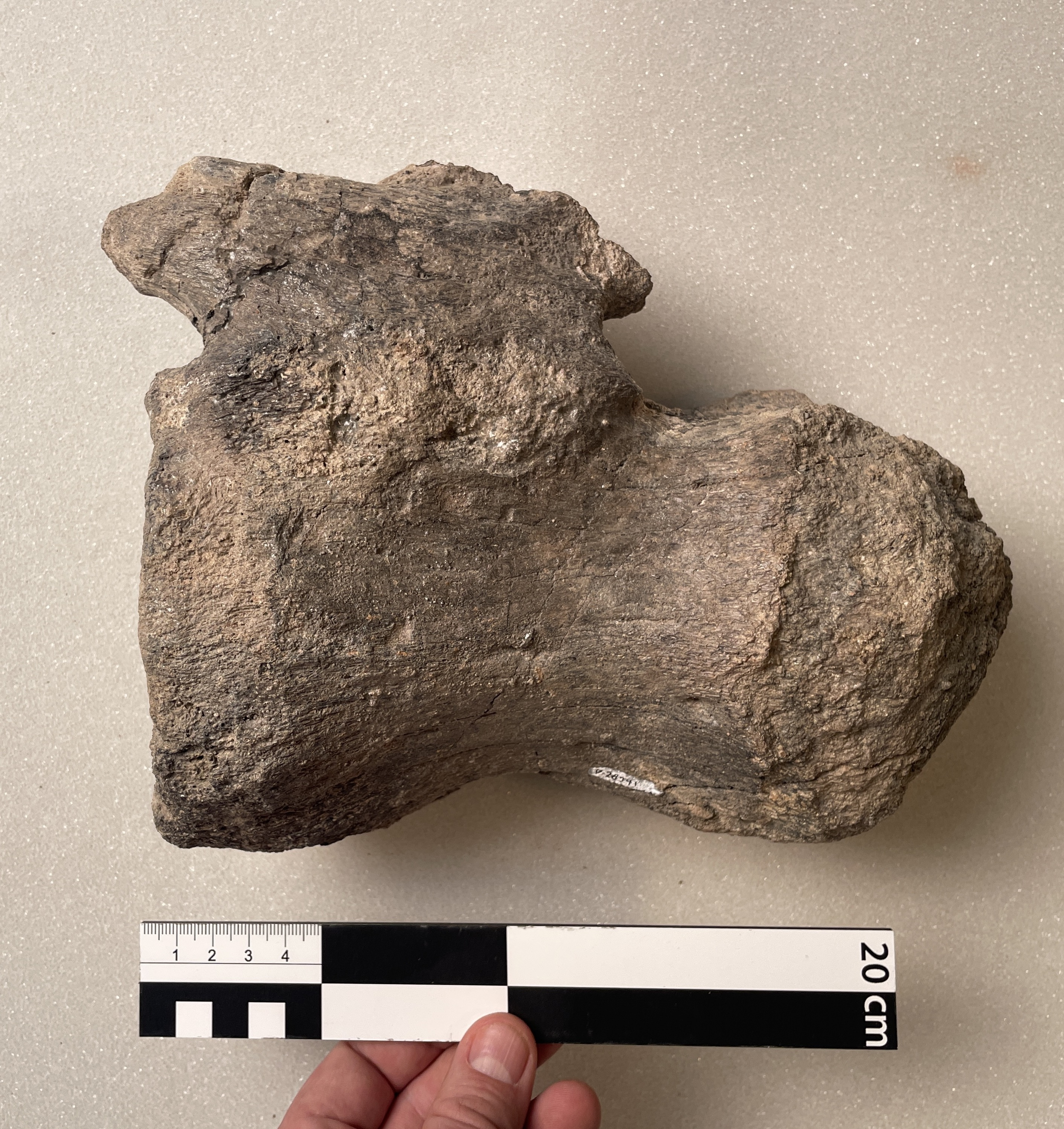
Isolated caudal vertebra (NMMNH P-28741) of Alamosaurus sanjuanensis

Alamosaurus fossils are most notably found in the Naashoibito Member of the Ojo Alamo Formation (or Kirtland Formation), dated to 66.87 ± 0.04 Ma and 66.38 ± 0.08 Ma around 5 metres (16 ft) and 3.5 metres (11 ft) above the base of the member respectively. A juvenile specimen of Alamosaurus has been reported to come from the Black Peaks Formation, which overlies the Javelina in Big Bend, Texas, and also straddles the Cretaceous-Paleogene boundary. The Alamosaurus specimen was reported to come from a few meters below the boundary, dated to 66 million years ago, though the position of the boundary in this region is uncertain.

In 2006, the middle portion of the Javenila Formation about 90 meters (300 ft) below the K-Pg boundary was dated to 69.0±0.9 million years ago by Lehman and colleagues. Using this date, in correlation with a measured age from the underlying Aguja Formation and the likely location of the K-Pg boundary in the overlying Black Peaks Formation, the authors argued that the Alamosaurus fauna seems to have lasted from about 70–66 million years ago, with the earliest records of Alamosaurus near the base of the Javelina Formation and the latest just below the K-Pg boundary in the Black Peaks Formation. However, Leslie et al. (2018) and Lehman et al. (2022) later corrected this age estimate, since the dinosaur fossils are actually known from the upper portion of the Javelina Formation. The K-Pg boundary of the Javelina Formation is known to be at the ~172 meters (564 ft) level, and the youngest-known Alamosaurus fossil-bearing locality (TxVP 42426, incorrectly referred to TxVP 41450 by Leslie et al. and subsequently corrected by Lehman et al.) is known from the top of the sandstone unit at ~145 meters (476 ft) level, approximately ~27 meters (89 ft) below the K-Pg boundary. With dating based on magnetostratigraphy constraining the maximum depositional age of the dinosaur fossil-bearing section at approximately 66.4 million years ago, the Alamosaurus fauna can be dated to the latest Maastrichtian age.

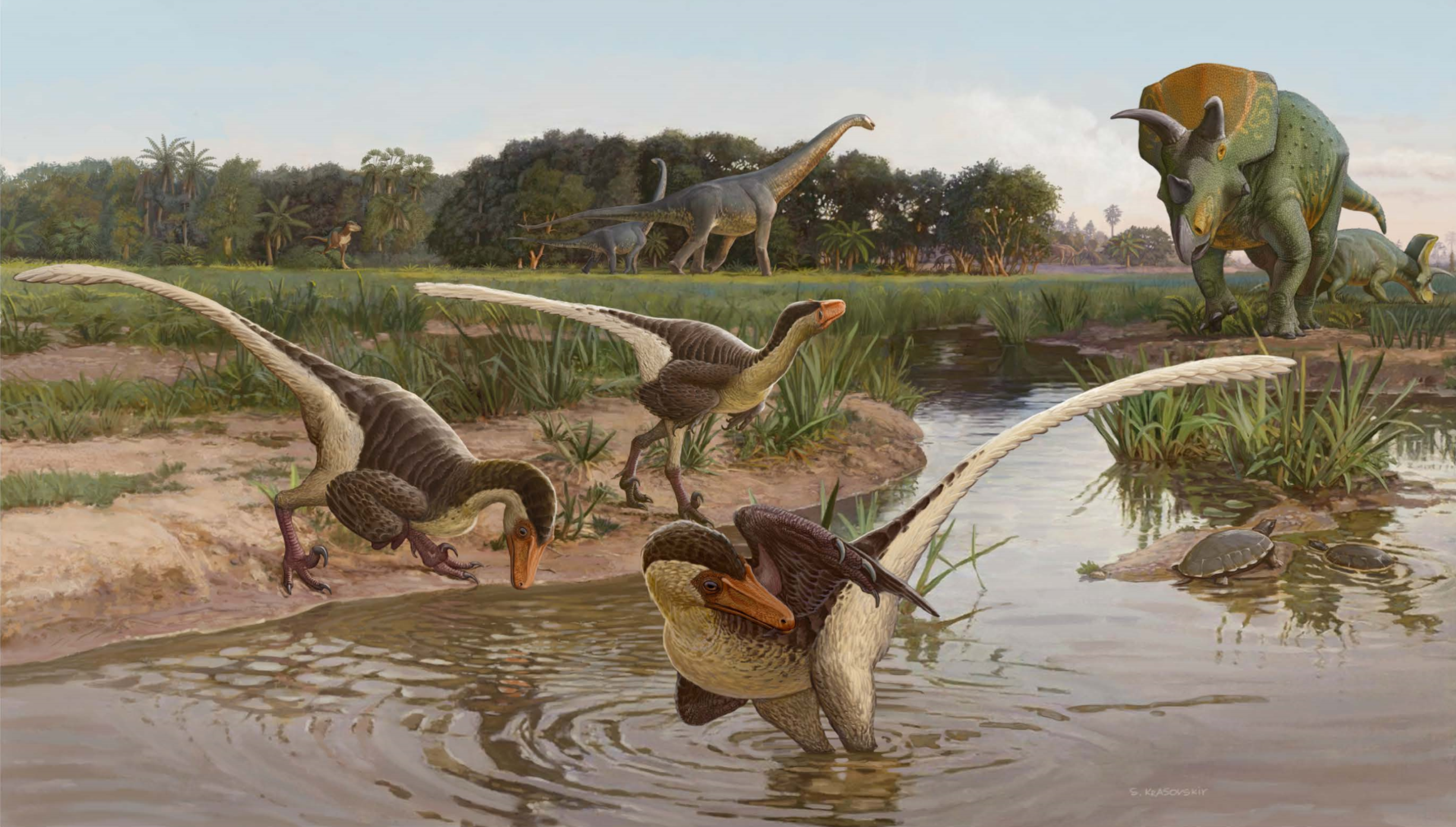
Restoration of Alamosaurus (background) and other dinosaurs from the Ojo Alamo Formation

Skeletal elements of Alamosaurus are among the most common Late Cretaceous dinosaur fossils found in the United States Southwest and are now used to define the fauna of that time and place, known as the "Alamosaurus fauna". In the south of Late Cretaceous North America, the transition from the Edmontonian to the Lancian faunal stages is even more dramatic than it was in the north. Thomas M. Lehman describes it as "the abrupt reemergence of a fauna with a superficially 'Jurassic' aspect. These faunas are dominated by Alamosaurus and feature abundant Quetzalcoatlus in Texas. The Alamosaurus-Quetzalcoatlus association probably represent semi-arid inland plains. Fossils of Alamosaurus unearthed in the Evanston Formation in Wyoming indicate it shared its environment with Triceratops.

Definitive specimens of Alamosaurus sanjuanensis are known from the Ojo Alamo Formation. Previously referred specimens from the North Horn Formation, the Black Peaks Formation and possibly the Javelina Formation have been assigned to Utetitan in 2025. Excluding the Black Peaks Formation, remains of troodontids and hadrosaurids such as Kritosaurus, a possible species of Gryposaurus, indeterminate saurolophines and lambeosaurines have been discovered from the other three formations. Specimens possibly belonging to or similar to Tyrannosaurus rex and Torosaurus utahensis (identified as cf. Tyrannosaurus and Torosaurus cf. utahensis) have been discovered from the Javelina Formation, where other archosaurs diagnostic to the species level have been discovered including the chasmosaurine ceratopsid Bravoceratops polyphemus, and the large azhdarchid pterosaurs Quetzalcoatlus northropi, Quetzalcoatlus lawsoni and Wellnhopterus brevirostris. Contemporary archosaurs in the Ojo Alamo Formation include the potentially dubious oviraptorosaur Ojoraptorsaurus, the dromaeosaurid Dineobellator, the armored nodosaurid Glyptodontopelta, and the chasmosaurine ceratopsid Ojoceratops. Non-archosaurian taxa that shared the same environment with Alamosaurus include various species of fish, rays, amphibians, lizards, turtles and multituberculates. A possible specimen of the genus identified as Alamosaurus sp. or cf. Alamosaurus coexisted with dinosaurs such as Tyrannosaurus mcraeensis and Sierraceratops from the McRae Group.
