= Batrachosauroididae =

Batrachosauroididae Temporal range: Campanian–Miocene

Scientific classification
- Kingdom: Animalia
- Phylum: Chordata
- Class: Amphibia
- Subclass: Lissamphibia
- Superorder: Batrachia
- Clade: Caudata
- Family: †Batrachosauroididae; Auffenberg, 1958

Synonyms
- Batrachosauridae

Extinct family of salamanders

Batrachosauroididae is an extinct family of prehistoric salamanders with holarctic distribution. They were paedomorphic and presumably aquatic. They are possibly the sister taxon of Proteidae, an extant family of aquatic salamanders. They are definitively known from the Late Cretaceous to Miocene of North America and Europe. Remains from the earliest Cretaceous (Berriasian) Lulworth Formation of England have tenatively been attributed to this family.

The following genera are included:

- Batrachosauroides United States, Eocene–Miocene
- Opisthotriton North America, Late Cretaceous–Paleocene
- Palaeoproteus Europe, Paleocene–Miocene
- Parrisia United States, Late Cretaceous
- Peratosauroides United States, Miocene
- Prodesmodon North America, Late Cretaceous–Paleocene

== See also ==
- Prehistoric amphibian
- List of prehistoric amphibians
