= Lignites de Soissonais =

Geologic formation in France

- Stratigraphic range: Ypresian; ~55–50 Ma
- Type: Formation

Lithology
- Primary: Lignite

Location
- Coordinates: 49.1°N 4.0°E
- Approximate paleocoordinates: 45.0°N 1.3°E
- Region: Var, Marne
- Country: France

Type section
- Named for: Soissonais
- Lignites de Soissonais (France)

The Lignites de Soissonais is a geologic formation in the Var, Marne departments of France. It preserves fossils dating back to the Ypresian stage of the Eocene period.

== Fossil content ==
The following fossils have been reported from the formation:

=== Reptiles ===
Turtles

- Axestemys vittata
- Francellia salouagmirae
- Merovemys ploegi
- Neochelys arenarum
- N. eocaenica
- Allaeochelys sp.
- Palaeochelys sp.
- Trionyx sp.

Lizards

- Dormaalisaurus girardoti
- Geiseltaliellus longicaudus
- Tinosaurus europeocaenus
- Eolacerta sp.
- Necrosaurus sp.
- Tinosaurus sp.
- Amphisbaenidae indet.
- Anguini indet.
- Helodermatidae indet.
- Gekkonidae indet.
- Melanosaurini indet.

Snakes

- Calamagras gallicus
- Dunnophis matronensis
- Saniwa orsmaelensis
- Anniealexandria sp.

=== Mammals ===
Primates

- Arcius fuscus
- A. lapparenti
- Avenius amatorum
- Cantius savagei
- Donrussellia provincialis
- Phenacolemur lapparenti
- Platychoerops daubrei
- Plesiadapis aff. remensis
- Pelycodus aff. eppsi
- Toliapina lawsoni
- T. vinealis
- cf. Agerinia sp.
- Adapidae indet.

Artiodactyls

- Bunophorus cappettai
- Diacodexis gazini
- D. varleti
- Cuisitherium sp.
- ?Diacodexis sp.
- ?Simpsonodus sp.

Carnivora

- Miacidae indet.
- ?Miacidae indet.

Cimolesta

- Plesiesthonyx luciae
- P. minimus
- cf. Hyracolestes sp.
- Palaeoryctidae indet.

Ferae

- Palaeonictis gigantea
- Quercygale smithi
- Uintacyon hookeri
- cf. Viverravus sp.

Hyaenodonta

- Didelphodus cf. absarokae
- Eoproviverra eisenmanni
- Galecyon gallus
- Minimovellentodon russelli
- Morlodon vellerei
- Preregidens cf. langebadrae
- Prototomus girardoti
- cf. Didelphodus sp.

Insectivora

- Apatemys mutiniacus
- A. sigogneaui
- Apatemys sp.
- Heterohyus sp.

Macroscelidea

- Neomatronella luciannae
- Macrocranion cf. nitens

Microchiroptera

- Ageina tobieni
- Icaronycteris menui

Microchiropteramorpha

- Archaeonycteris brailloni
- cf. Ageina sp.
- cf. Archaeonycteris sp.

Multituberculata

- Ectypodus riansensis

Perissodactyls

- Cymbalophus cuniculus
- Hyracotherium aff. leporinum
- Paschatherium russelli
- P. cf. dolloi
- ?Paschatherium sp.
- Pliolophus vulpiceps
- Teilhardimys musculus

Placentalia

- Hyopsodus itinerans
- Phenacodus cf. teilhardi
- cf. Paroxyclaenus sp.
- Phenacodus sp.

Rodents

- Microparamys cf. chandoni
- Pantrogna russelli
- Paramys cf. pourcyensis
- ?Ailuravinae indet.

Soricomorpha

- Placentidens lotus
- cf. Leptacodon sp.

Theriiformes

- Amphiperatherium aff. brabantense
- A. goethei
- A. cf. maximum
- Peradectes louisi
- Peratherium matronense
- ?Leptictidae indet.
- ?Nyctitheriidae indet.
- cf. Paroxyclaenidae indet.

== See also ==
- List of fossiliferous stratigraphic units in France
- Ypresian formations
  - Ieper Group of Belgium
  - Fur Formation of Denmark
  - London Clay Formation of England
  - Silveirinha Formation of Portugal
- Wasatchian formations
  - Nanjemoy Formation of the eastern United States
  - Wasatch Formation of the western United States
- Itaboraian formations
  - Itaboraí Formation of Brazil
  - Laguna del Hunco Formation of Argentina
