= Nacimiento Formation =

Geologic formation in New Mexico

- Stratigraphic range: Paleocene; ~65.7–61 Ma
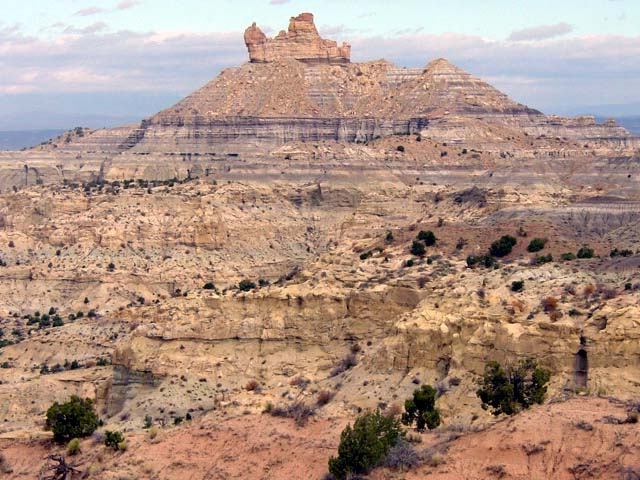
- The badlands below Angel Peak are made up of Nacimiento Formation rocks
- Type: Formation
- Underlies: San Jose Formation
- Overlies: Ojo Alamo Formation
- Thickness: 254 m (833 ft)

Lithology
- Primary: Shale
- Other: Siltstone, sandstone

Location
- Coordinates: 36.0126977°N 106.9855481°W
- Region: New Mexico
- Country: United States

Type section
- Named for: Nacimiento (now Cuba, New Mexico)
- Named by: J.H. Gardner
- Year defined: 1910
- Nacimiento Formation (the United States) Nacimiento Formation (New Mexico)

The Nacimiento Formation is a sedimentary rock formation in the San Juan Basin of western New Mexico (United States). It is dated to approximately 61.0–65.7 million years ago, corresponding to the early and middle Paleocene. The formation has yielded numerous fossil assemblages from the interval following the Cretaceous–Paleogene extinction event, which have been used to study biotic recovery and the early diversification of mammals after the extinction.

== Description ==
The Nacimiento Formation is a heterogeneous nonmarine formation composed of shale, siltstone, and sandstone, deposited in floodplain, fluvial and lacustrine settings, and made up of sediment shed from the San Juan uplift to the north and the Brazos-Sangre de Cristo uplift to the east. It was deposited mostly between ~65.7 and ~61 million years ago, during the early and middle Paleocene. The climate was humid and warm to hot and stable, but with a distinct dry season. This unit interbeds with the underlying Ojo Alamo Formation but is separated by an unconformity from the overlying San Jose Formation.

The Nacimiento Formation is divided into several subunits known as members. In outcrops in southern areas of the formation, the Puercan fauna is found in the Arroyo Chijuillita Member, the Torrejonian fauna is found in the Ojo Encino Member, and the uppermost Escavada Member lacks age-diagnostic fossils. In northern outcrops, the two lower members are indistinguishable, and are called the "main body". Above them are two more informal members. These preserve a younger, Tiffanian fauna. The Puercan and Torrejonian faunas are further subdivided into several biostratigraphic zones.

== Fossils ==
Many fossils are known from the Nacimiento Formation, although bone is often altered into phosphatic concretions. Fossils belonging to a number of different organisms have been found here, including: plants (mostly dicotyledonous angiosperms), gastropods, freshwater bivalves, cartilaginous fish and bony fish, salamanders, turtles, champsosaurs, amphisbaenians, lizards, snakes, crocodilians, birds, and a variety of archaic mammals. Mammalian groups represented include multituberculates, plesiadapiforms, didelphid marsupials, insectivorans, carnivorans, taeniodonts, mesonychians, condylarths, and cimolestans. Fossil remains found in the formation support the validity of the genus Thylacodon and the species T. montanensis.

These fossils provide important clues to the impact of the Cretaceous–Paleogene extinction event on mammals and to the recovery, evolution, and turnover of mammals shortly after the event. The formation and its fossils provide a particularly clear record of the To2-To3 turnover event, allowing the timing of the event to be constrained to between 62.59 and 62.47 million years ago. The event may have been associated with climate change or with the rapid development of a river system across the San Juan basin, which caused a temporary pause in sediment deposition that separates the Nacimiento Formation from the San Jose Formation.

== Fossil content ==
Based on the Paleobiology Database:

Color key: Taxon / Reclassified taxon / Taxon falsely reported as present / Dubious taxon or junior synonym / Ichnotaxon / Ootaxon / Morphotaxon

Notes
Uncertain or tentative taxa are in small text
~~crossed out~~ taxa are discredited.

=== Actinopterygii ===
Boney Fish of the Nacimiento Formation
Genus	Species	Location	Stratigraphic position	Material	Notes	Images
Lepisosteidae indet.			Torrejonian		A gar of uncertain affinities.	

=== Amphibians ===
Amphibians of the Nacimiento Formation
Genus	Species	Location	Stratigraphic position	Material	Notes	Images
Habrosaurus	H. dilatus		Torrejonian		A sirenid salamander.	

=== Reptiles ===
==== Crocodyliformes ====
Crocodyliformes of the Nacimiento Formation
Genus	Species	Location	Stratigraphic position	Material	Notes	Images
Akanthosuchus	A. langstoni		Puercan & Torrejonian		An alligatorid.	
Listrognathosuchus	L. multidentatus		Torrejonian		An alligatoroid.	
Navajosuchus	L. mooki		Puercan & Torrejonian		An alligatorid.	

==== Turtles ====
Turtles of the Nacimiento Formation
Genus	Species	Location	Stratigraphic position	Material	Notes	Images
Adocus	A. hesperius		Puercan		An adocid turtle.	
Adocus	A. onerosus		Torrejonian		An adocid turtle.	
Axestemys	A. montinsana		Puercan		A softshell turtle.	
Compsemys	C. victa		Puercan/Torrejonian		A compsemydid turtle.	
"Emys"	"E." sp.		Puercan/Torrejonian		A pond turtle.	
Hutchemys	H. acupictus		Puercan		A plastomenid stem-softshell turtle.	
Hoplochelys	H. crassa		Puercan/Torrejonian		A kinosternoid turtle. Type locality of species.	
Neurankylus	N. cf. eximius		Puercan		A baenid turtle. Type locality of N. torrejonensis.	
Neurankylus	N. torrejonensis		Torrejonian, potentially Puercan		A baenid turtle. Type locality of N. torrejonensis.	
Plastomenus	P. vegetus		Puercan		A plastomenid stem-softshell turtle.	
"Platypeltis"	"P." antiqua		Torrejonian		A stem-softshell turtle. Nomen dubium.	
"Trionyx" (=Paleotrionyx)	"T." eloisae		Puercan		A softshell turtle. Type locality of species.	
"Trionyx" (=Paleotrionyx)	"T." reesidei		Puercan		A softshell turtle. Type locality of species.	
"Trionyx" (=Paleotrionyx)	"T." singularis		Puercan		A softshell turtle. Type locality of species.	

==== Squamates ====
Squamates of the Nacimiento Formation
Genus	Species	Location	Stratigraphic position	Material	Notes	Images
Glyptosaurinae indet.			Puercan & Torrejonian		A glyptosaurine anguid of uncertain affinities.	
Helagras	H. prisciformis		Puercan		An afrophidian snake, the largest known Early Paleocene snake.	
Machaerosaurus	M. torrejonensis		Torrejonian		A glyptosaurine anguid.	
Odaxosaurus	O. piger		Puercan		A glyptosaurine anguid.	
Parodaxosaurus	P. sanjuanensis		Torrejonian		A glyptosaurine anguid.	
Plesiorhineura	P. tsentasi		Torrejonian		A rhineurid worm lizard.	
Proxestops	P. silberlingii		Puercan & Torrejonian		A glyptosaurine anguid.	

==== Birds ====
Birds of the Nacimiento Formation
Genus	Species	Location	Stratigraphic position	Material	Notes	Images
Tsidiiyazhi	T. abini		Torrejonian		A relative of the mousebirds.	

=== Mammals ===
Primary based on Kondrashov and Lucas (2015), with changes where necessary:

==== Archaic Ungulates ====
'Condylarths' of the Nacimiento Formation
Genus	Species	Stratigraphic position	Notes	Images
Anisonchus	A. sectorius	Torrejonian 1–3	A periptychid	
Carsioptychus	C. coarctatus	Puercan 2–3	A periptychid originally described as a species of the genus Periptychus.	
Conacodon	C. cophater	Puercan 2–3	A periptychid	
Conacodon	C. entoconus	Puercan 2	A periptychid	
Conacodon	C. kohlbergeri	Puercan 2	A periptychid	
Ectoconus	E. ditrigonus	Puercan 2–3	A periptychid	
Haploconus	H. augustus	Torrejonian 1–2	A periptychid	
Hemithlaeus	H. kowalewskianus	Puercan 2	A periptychid	
Mithrandir	M. gillianus	Puercan 2–3	A periptychid originally described as a species of the genus Anisochus.	
Oxyacodon	O. agapetillus	Puercan 2	A periptychid	
Oxyacodon	O. apiculatus	Puercan 2–3	A periptychid	
Oxyacodon	O. priscilla	Puercan 2	A periptychid	
Periptychus	P. carinidens	Torrejonian 1–3	A periptychid	

==== Arctocyonia ====
Arctocyonians of the Nacimiento Formation
Genus	Species	Stratigraphic position	Notes	Images
Arctocyon	A. corrugatus	Torrejonian 2	An arctocyonid	
Arctocyon	A. ferox	Torrejonian 2–3	An arctocyonid	
Chriacus	C. baldwini	Torrejonian 2–3	An arctocyonid	
Chriacus	C. orthogonius	Torrejonian	An arctocyonid	
Chriacus	C. pelvidens	Torrejonian 2–3	An arctocyonid	
Colpoclaenus	C. procyonoides	Torrejonian 3	An arctocyonid	
Desmatoclaenus	D. dianae	Puercan 2–3	An arctocyonid	
Desmatoclaenus	D. protogonoides	Puercan 2–3	An arctocyonid	
Deuterogonodon	D. montanus	Torrejonian 1–2	An arctocyonid	
Loxolophus	L. hyattianus	Puercan 2–3	An arctocyonid	
Loxolophus	L. pentacus	Puercan 2–3	An arctocyonid	
Loxolophus	L. priscus	Puercan 3	An arctocyonid	
Prothryptacodon	P. ambiguus	Torrejonian 3	An arctocyonid	
Tricentes	T. subtrigonus	Torrejonian 1–3	An arctocyonid	

==== Carnivorans ====
Carnivorans of the Nacimiento Formation
Genus	Species	Stratigraphic position	Notes	Images
Bryanictis	B. paulus	Torrejonian 2	A viverravid carnivoran	
Intyrictis	I. vanvaleni	Torrejonian 2	A viverravid carnivoran	
Protictis	P. haydenianus	Torrejonian 2–3	A viverravid carnivoran	
Protictis	P. minor	Torrejonian 2	A viverravid carnivoran	
Protictis	P. simpsoni	Torrejonian 2	A viverravid carnivoran	

==== Cimolesta ====
Cimolestans of the Nacimiento Formation
Genus	Species	Stratigraphic position	Notes	Images
Acemeodon	A. secans	Torrejonian 2–3	A cimolestid cimolestan	
Betonnia	B. tsosia	Puercan 2–3	A cimolestid cimolestan	
Chacopterygus	C. minutus	Puercan 2–3	A cimolestid cimolestan	
Palaeoryctes	P. puercensis	Torrejonian 2–3	A palaeoryctid cimolestan	
Puercolestes	P. simpsoni	Puercan 2–3	A cimolestid cimolestan	

==== Euarchonta ====
Euarchontans of the Nacimiento Formation
Genus	Species	Stratigraphic position	Notes	Images
Anasazia	A. williamsoni	Torrejonian 2	A palaechthonid plesiadapiform	
Mixodectes	M. malaris	Torrejonian 2–3	A mixodectid	
Mixodectes	M. pungens	Torrejonian 3	A mixodectid	
Palaechthon	P. woodi	Tiffanian 1	A palaechthonid plesiadapiform	
Paromomys	P. libedianus	Torrejonian 2	A paromomyid plesiadapiform	
Picrodus	P. calgariensis	Torrejonian 2	A picrodontid plesiadapiform	
Plesiolestes	P. nacimienti	Torrejonian 2–3	A palaechthonid plesiadapiform	
Plesiolestes	P. torrejonius	Torrejonian 2	A palaechthonid plesiadapiform	
Torrejonia	T. wilsoni	Torrejonian 3	A palaechthonid plesiadapiform	

==== Eutheria Incertae sedis ====
Other Eutherians of the Nacimiento Formation
Genus	Species	Stratigraphic position	Notes	Images
Deltatherium	D. dandreae	Torrejonian 2–3	A eutherian mammal of unknown placement	
Deltatherium	D. fundaminis	Torrejonian 4–5	A eutherian mammal of unknown placement	

==== Leptictida ====
Leptictidans of the Nacimiento Formation
Genus	Species	Stratigraphic position	Notes	Images
Prodiacodon	P. puercensis	Torrejonian 1–3	A leptictiid leptictidan	

==== Mesonychians ====
Mesonychians of the Nacimiento Formation
Genus	Species	Stratigraphic position	Notes	Images
Ankalagon	A. saurognathus	Torrejonian 2–3	A mesonychid mesonychian	
Carcinodon	C. antiquus	Puercan 3	A triisodontid mesonychian	
Carcinodon	C. olearyi	Puercan 2–3	A triisodontid mesonychian	
Carcinodon	C. simplex	Puercan 2	A triisodontid mesonychian	
Dissacus	D. navajovius	Torrejonian 2–3	A mesonychid mesonychian	
Eoconodon	E. coryphaeus	Puercan 2–3	A triisodontid mesonychian	
Eoconodon	E. gaudrianus	Puercan 2	A triisodontid mesonychian	
Eoconodon	E. ginibitohia	Puercan 2	A triisodontid mesonychian	
Goniacodon	G. levisanus	Torrejonian 2–3	A triisodontid mesonychian	
Oxyclaenus	O. cuspidatus	Torrejonian 2–3	A triisodontid mesonychian	
Triisodon	T. crassicuspis	Torrejonian 2	A triisodontid mesonychian	
Triisodon	T. quivirensis	Torrejonian 2	A triisodontid mesonychian	

==== Metatheria ====
Metatherians of the Nacimiento Formation
Genus	Species	Stratigraphic position	Notes	Images
Peradectes	P. coprexeches	Torrejonian 2–3	A peradectid metatherian	
Peradectes	P. minor	Puercan 2–3	A peradectid metatherian	
Swaindelphys	S. encinensis	Torrejonian 2	A herpetotheriid metatherian	
Swaindelphys	S. johnsoni	Torrejonian 3	A herpetotheriid metatherian	
Thylacodon	T. pusillus	Puercan 2–3	A herpetotheriid metatherian	

==== Multituberculata ====
Multituberculates of the Nacimiento Formation
Genus	Species	Stratigraphic position	Notes	Images
Anconodon	A. gidleyi	Torrejonian 2	A neoplagiaulacid multituberculate	
Catopsalis	C. fissidens	Torrejonian 2	A taeinolabid multituberculate	
Catopsalis	C. foliatus	Puercan 2	A taeinolabid multituberculate	
Ectypodus	E. szalayi	Torrejonian 2	A neoplagiaulacid multituberculate	
Eucosmodon	E. americanus	Puercan 2	An eucosmodontid multituberculate	
Eucosmodon	E. molestus	Torrejonian 2	An eucosmodontid multituberculate	
Eucosmodon	E. primus	Puercan 2	An eucosmodontid multituberculate	
Kimbetohia	K. campi	Puercan 2	A ptilodontid multituberculate	
Kimbetopsalis	K. simmonsae	Puercan 2	A taeinolabid multituberculate	
Krauseia	K. clemensi	Torrejonian 2	A neoplagiaulacid multituberculate	
Liotomus	L. vanvaleni	Puercan 2	A cimolodontid multituberculate	
Mesodma	M. formosa	Puercan 2	A neoplagiaulacid multituberculate	
Mesodma	M. thompsoni	Puercan 2	A neoplagiaulacid multituberculate	
Mimetodon	M. krausei	Torrejonian 2	A neoplagiaulacid multituberculate	
Neoplagiaulax	N. macintyrei	Puercan 2	A neoplagiaulacid multituberculate	
Neoplagiaulax	N. macrotomeus	Torrejonian 2	A neoplagiaulacid multituberculate	
Parectypodus	P. trovessartianus	Torrejonian 2	A neoplagiaulacid multituberculate	
Ptilodus	P. mediaevus	Torrejonian 2–3	A ptilodontid multituberculate	
Ptilodus	P. tsosiensis	Puercan 2	A ptilodontid multituberculate	
Stygimys	S. teilhardi	Torrejonian 2	An eucosmodontid multituberculate	
Taeniolabis	T. simmonsae	Puercan 3	A taeinolabid multituberculate	
Taeniolabis	T. taoensis	Puercan 3	A taeinolabid multituberculate	

==== Palaeanodonta ====
Palaeanodonta of the Nacimiento Formation
Genus	Species	Stratigraphic position	Notes	Images
Escavadodon	E. zygus	Torrejonian 3	An escavadodontid palaeanodont	

==== Panperissodactyla ====
Panperissodactyls of the Nacimiento Formation
Genus	Species	Stratigraphic position	Notes	Images
Bomburodon	B. priscus	Puercan 2–3	A hyopsodontid	
Choeroclaenus	C. turgidunculus	Puercan 2–3	A hyopsodontid	
Chacomylus	C. sladei	Puercan 3	A hyopsodontid	
Litomylus	L. osceolae	Torrejonian 2–3	A hyopsodontid	
Mioclaenus	M. turgidus	Torrejonian 1–3	A hyopsodontid	
Promioclaenus	P. wilsoni	Puercan 2–3	A hyopsodontid	
Protoselene	P. bombadili	Puercan 2–3	A hyopsodontid	
Protoselene	P. opisthacus	Torrejonian 2–3	A hyopsodontid	
Tetraclaenodon	T. puercensis	Torrejonian 1–3	A phenacodontid	
Tiznatzinia	T. vanderhoofi	Puercan 2–3	A hyopsodontid	

==== Pantodonts ====
Pantodonts of the Nacimiento Formation
Genus	Species	Stratigraphic position	Notes	Images
Pantolambda	P. bathmodon	Torrejonian 3	A pantolambdid pantodont	
Pantolambda	P. cavirictum	Torrejonian 2–3	A pantolambdid pantodont	
Pantolambda	P. intermedium	Torrejonian 2	A pantolambdid pantodont	

==== Pantolesta ====
Pantolestans of the Nacimiento Formation
Genus	Species	Stratigraphic position	Notes	Images
Coriphagus	C. encinensis	Torrejonian 2–3	A pentacodontid pantolestan	
Pentacodon	P. inversus	Torrejonian 2	A pentacodontid pantolestan	
Pentacodon	P. occultus	Torrejonian 3	A pentacodontid pantolestan	

==== Taeniodonta ====
Taeniodonts of the Nacimiento Formation
Genus	Species	Stratigraphic position	Notes	Images
Conorystes	C. comma	Torrejonian 2–3	A conoryctid taeniodont	
Conoryctella	C. pattersoni	Torrejonian 2	A conoryctid taeniodont	
Huerfanodon	H. torrejonius	Torrejonian 2	A conoryctid taeniodont	
Onychodectes	O. tisonensis	Puercan 2–3	A conoryctid taeniodont	
Psittacotherium	P. multifragum	Torrejonian 2–3	A stylinodontid taeniodont	
Wortmania	W. otariidens	Puercan 2–3	A stylinodontid taeniodont	

=== Molluscs ===
==== Bivalves ====
Bivalves of the Nacimiento Formation
Genus	Species	Location	Stratigraphic position	Material	Notes	Images

==== Gastropods ====
Gastopods of the Nacimiento Formation
Genus	Species	Location	Stratigraphic position	Material	Notes	Images

== History of investigation ==
Edward Drinker Cope described the fossils during the Wheeler Survey.

Workers in the early 1900s divided the rocks of the Nacimiento Formation into two formations, the lower Puerco Formation and the upper Torrejon Formation. This was rejected on the grounds that there were no lithological differences between the two, only differences in fossil faunas, making determination of which formation was present in a given area impossible if fossils could not be found. The Puerco and Torrejon were retained as zones within the Nacimiento Formation, and their faunas became the basis of the Puercan and Torrejonian North American Land Mammal Ages.
