= Silveirinha Formation =

Geologic formation in Portugal

- Stratigraphic range: Ypresian (MP7 or Neustrian); ~55.8–48.6 Ma
- Restoration of the Silveirinha Formation palaeoenvironment
- Type: Geological formation
- Sub-units: Rio Mondego Member
- Underlies: Bom Sucesso Formation
- Overlies: Taveiro Formation

Lithology
- Primary: Sandstone, siltstone
- Other: Conglomerate

Location
- Coordinates: 40.0°N 8.8°W
- Approximate paleocoordinates: 35.6°N 10.0°W
- Region: Região Centro
- Country: Portugal
- Extent: Mondego Basin

Type section
- Named for: Silveirinha clay pit
- Named by: Autunes et al.
- Location: Silveirinha clay pit
- Year defined: 1981
- Coordinates: 40°00′29.0″N 8°49′16.7″W
- Region: Coimbra District
- Silveirinha Formation (Portugal)

The Silveirinha Formation is an Early Eocene (Ypresian, or MP7 or Neustrian in the ELMA classification) geologic formation of the Mondego Basin in the Região Centro of central-western Portugal. The sandstones, siltstones and conglomerates were deposited in an alluvial environment.

The formation has provided fossils of many mammals, birds, amphibians and reptiles, as well as mollusks and ostracods, and is considered one of the richest Early Eocene faunal assemblages of Europe. The taeniodont, typically known as a North American order; Eurodon silveirinhensis and the ostracod Cypris silveirinhaensis have been named after the formation.

== Description ==
The Silveirinha Formation, named after the Silveirinha clay pit, crops out in the western part of the Mondego Basin in the Região Centro of central-western Portugal. The formation comprises fossiliferous lenticular calcitic conglomerates as well as laminated and cross bedded sands and brownish-red silts.

The conglomerates are interpreted as crevasse-splay deposit in a alluvial plain environment, which eventually flooded and where bogs and possibly oxbows developed, crossed by channels depending on a river system that drained higher areas more north or eastwards.

=== Climate ===
The climate in the Early Eocene was substantially warmer than today.

== Paleontological significance ==
Color key: Taxon / Reclassified taxon / Taxon falsely reported as present / Dubious taxon or junior synonym / Ichnotaxon / Ootaxon / Morphotaxon	Notes; Uncertain or tentative taxa are in small text; ~~crossed out~~ taxa are discredited.

The Silveirinha clay pit after which the formation is named was first discovered in 1977 by Rui Pena dos Reis of Coimbra University. The unit is one of few earliest Eocene fossiliferous formations that provided a rich amphibian and reptile fauna. Most fossils were deposited in the channels after short transportation. Vegetation should have been rich in nearby areas, supporting a rich fauna. Ostracods, gastropods, amphibians and pelomedusid chelonians indicate fresh waters, although rare bivalves show that salt or at least brackish waters were not very far away.

It is hypothesized that the species D. antunesi in the genus Diacodexis was more primitive than the earliest Wasatchian D. ilicis of North America, strongly supporting a Europe to America dispersal of this genus.

The formation has provided the following fossils:

=== Mammals ===
==== Apatotherians ====
Apatotherians reported from the Silveirinha Formation
Genus	Species	Material	Notes	Images
Apatemys	A. sp. I		Unnamed species of apatemyid	
Apatemys	cf. A. sp. II		Unnamed species of apatemyid comparable to Apatemys	
Heterohyus	H. sp. I		Unnamed species of apatemyid	
Heterohyus	H. sp. II		Unnamed species of apatemyid	
Russellmys	R. denisae	Left maxilla with embedded teeth	An apatemyid	

==== Bats ====
Bats reported from the Silveirinha Formation
Genus	Species	Material	Notes	Images
Archaeonycteris	A.? praecursor	Tooth	An archaeonycterid	

==== Cimolestans ====
Cimolestans reported from the Silveirinha Formation
Genus	Species	Material	Notes	Images
Didelphodus	D. sp.		A cimolestid	
Ilerdoryctes	I. cf. sigei		A cimolestid	

==== Eulipotyphlans ====
Eulipotyphlans reported from the Silveirinha Formation
Genus	Species	Material	Notes	Images
Dormaalidae indet.	Indeterminate		Reported as a dormaalid (a now invalid term synonymous with Amphilemuridae)	
Leptacodon	L. nascimentoi		A nyctitheriid	
Leptacodon	cf. L. sp.		A nyctitheriid	
Nyctitheriidae indet.	Indeterminate		Remains of an undetermined nyctitheriid	
Talpavus	?T. sp.		Am erinaceomorph	

==== Ferae ====
Ferae reported from the Silveirinha Formation
Genus	Species	Material	Notes	Images
Creodonta indet.	Indeterminate		Reported as a creodont (a now obsolete group consisting of oxyaenids and hyaenodonts)	
Dormaalocyon	D. cf. latouri		A carnivoramorph, originally reported as a species of Miacis	
Miacidae indet.	Indeterminate		A carnivoramorph	
Miacis	M. cf. latouri		Reassigned to the genus Dormaalocyon	
Miacis	cf. M. sp.		A carnivoramorph	
Viverravus	cf. V. sp.		A viverravid	

==== Metatherians ====
Metatherians reported from the Silveirinha Formation
Genus	Species	Material	Notes	Images
Peratherium	P. cf. constans		A herpetotheriid	

==== Primatomorphs ====
Primatomorphs reported from the Silveirinha Formation
Genus	Species	Material	Notes	Images
Arcius	A. zbyszewskii	Teeth	A paromomyid	
Cantius	cf. C. sp.		An adapiform	
Donrussellia	D. lusitanica	Teeth	An adapiform	

==== Rodents ====
Rodents reported from the Silveirinha Formation
Genus	Species	Material	Notes	Images
Corbarimys	C. paisi	Teeth	An ischyromyid, originally reported as a species of Microparamys	
Euromys	E. cardosoi	Jaw fragment and teeth	An ischyromyid	
Meldimys	M. cardosoi	Jaw fragment and teeth	Reassigned to the genus Euromys	
Microparamys	M. paisi	Teeth	Reassigned to the genus Corbarimys	
Microparamys	M. cf. nanus		An ischyromyid	

==== Taeniodonts ====
Taeniodonts reported from the Silveirinha Formation
Genus	Species	Material	Notes	Images
Eurodon	E. silveirinhensis	Teeth	A conoryctid	

==== Ungulates ====
Ungulates reported from the Silveirinha Formation
Genus	Species	Material	Notes	Images
Diacodexis	D. antunesi	Teeth and an astragalus	A diacodexeid	
Hyracotherium	H. cf. vulpiceps		Species reassigned to the genus Pliolophus	
Lophiaspis	L. maurettei	Deciduous premolar tooth	A lophiodontid	
Microhyus	M. reisi	446 teeth, 4 astragali and 9 calcanei	Genus renamed as Teilhardimys	
Mondegodon	M. eutrigonus	Teeth	A mesonychian	
Paschatherium	P. marianae	Teeth	A hyopsodontid	
Pliolophus	P. cf. vulpiceps		An equid, originally reported as a species of Hyracotherium	
Teilhardimys	T. reisi	446 teeth, 4 astragali and 9 calcanei	A hyopsodontid, originally reported under the name Microhyus reisi	

=== Reptiles ===
==== Birds ====
Birds reported from the Silveirinha Formation
Genus	Species	Material	Notes	Images
Fluviatilavis	F. antunesi	Leg bones	A recurvirostrid	
Neornithes indet.	Indeterminate		Remains of an undetermined small bird	

==== Crocodilians ====
Crocodilians reported from the Silveirinha Formation
Genus	Species	Material	Notes	Images
Diplocynodon	D. sp.	Isolated bones and teeth	An eusuchian	

==== Squamates ====
Squamates reported from the Silveirinha Formation
Genus	Species	Material	Notes	Images
Amphisbaenidae indet.	Indeterminate	2 jaw fragments and about 10 trunk vertebrae	A worm lizard	
Anguinae indet.	Indeterminate	A partial jaw bone and a trunk vertebra	An anguid lizard	
Boidae indet.	Indeterminate	16 trunk vertebrae	A boa	
Dunnophis	D. matronensis	34 trunk vertebrae	A dwarf boa	
Geiseltaliellus	G. sp.	Posterior part of the maxilla	A casquehead lizard	
Gekkonidae indet.	Indeterminate	Two jaw fragments and a trunk vertebra	A gecko	
Glyptosaurinae indet.	Indeterminate	Incomplete jaw bones and hundreds of osteoderms	A glyptosaurine	
Glyptosaurini indet.	Indeterminate	Skull fragments and isolated osteoderms	A glyptosaurine	
Iguanidae indet.	Indeterminate	3 bone fragments with teeth	An iguanid	
Melanosaurini indet.	Indeterminate	An incomplete parietal	A glyptosaurine	
Melanosaurus	cf. M. sp.	An incomplete jugal and a fragmentary skull bone (probably a parietal)	A glyptosaurine	
Scincomorpha indet.	Indeterminate genus 1	4 bone fragments with teeth	A scincomorph lizard	
Scincomorpha indet.	Indeterminate genus 2	A bone fragment with 2 teeth and a trunk vertebra	A scincomorph lizard	
Serpentes indet.	Indeterminate	A trunk vertebra	A non-boa snake	
Tinosaurus	cf. T. sp.	Bone fragment with 2 teeth	An agamid	
Varanidae indet.	Indeterminate	A trunk vertebra	A monitor lizard	

==== Turtles ====
Turtles reported from the Silveirinha Formation
Genus	Species	Material	Notes	Images
Neochelys	N. sp.	Isolated fragments	A side-necked turtle	

=== Amphibians ===
Amphibians reported from the Silveirinha Formation
Genus	Species	Material	Notes	Images
Pelobatidae indet.	Indeterminate	2 ilium fragments	A European spadefoot toad	
Salamandridae indet.	Indeterminate	Vertebrae and humerus fragments	A salamander	

=== Fish ===
Fish reported from the Silveirinha Formation
Genus	Species	Material	Notes	Images
Egertonia	E. sp.		A bonefish	
Percichthyidae indet.	Indeterminate		A temperate perch	

=== Invertebrates ===
==== Arthropods ====
Arthropods reported from the Silveirinha Formation
Genus	Species	Material	Notes	Images
Cyclocypris	C.? sp.		An ostracod	
Cypria	C.? sp.		An ostracod	
Cypridacea indet.	Indet. sp. 1		An ostracod, outline similar to that of Hebeina ovata	
Cypridacea indet.	Indet. sp. 2		An ostracod	
Cypridacea indet.	Indet. sp. 3		An ostracod, morphologically similar to Eucypris	
Cypridacea indet.	Indet. sp. 4		An ostracod, morphologically similar to Eucypris	
Cypris	C. silveirinhaensis	12 carapaces	An ostracod	
Ilyocypris	I. lusitanicus	5 carapaces	An ostracod	
Lepidoptera indet.	Indeterminate	Coleophore	Case of a moth	

==== Molluscs ====
Molluscs reported from the Silveirinha Formation
Genus	Species	Material	Notes	Images
Bithynia	B. soaresi	Shells and opercula	A freshwater snail	
Cardiacea indet.	Indeterminate	Small valve fragment	A cockle	
Chlamys	C. sp.	Valve fragment	A scallop	
Gyraulus	G. antunesi	Shell fragments and internal moulds	A freshwater snail	

=== Plants ===
Plants reported from the Silveirinha Formation
Genus	Species	Material	Notes	Images
Dicotyledoneae indet.	Indeterminate	Seeds	Fossil seeds of several types of dicots	
Gymnospermae indet.	Indeterminate	Amber	Resin of an undetermined gymnosperm	
Nitellopsis	N. (Tectochara) dutemplei	Large numbers of gyrogonites	A green alga	
Vitis	V. sp.		A grapevine	

== See also ==
- List of fossiliferous stratigraphic units in Portugal
- Nanjemoy Formation, contemporaneous fossiliferous formation of the eastern United States
- Wasatch Formation, contemporaneous fossiliferous formation of the western United States
- Itaboraí Formation, contemporaneous fossiliferous formation of eastern Brazil
