= Torrejonia =

Torrejonia Temporal range: Middle–Late Paleocene, ~63.3–58 Ma

Scientific classification
- Kingdom: Animalia
- Phylum: Chordata
- Class: Mammalia
- Infraclass: Placentalia
- Order: †Plesiadapiformes
- Family: †Palaechthonidae
- Genus: †Torrejonia; Gazin, 1968

Extinct genus of primates

Torrejonia is a genus of extinct plesiadapiform that belongs to the family Palaechthonidae. There are currently two species known, T. wilsoni and T. sirokyi. This genus is present in the fossil record from around 62–58 Ma (late Torrejonian-Tiffanian North American Land Mammals Ages [NALMA]). Species belonging to this genus are suggested to be plesiadapiforms based on adaptations observed in the skeletal morphology consistent with arboreal locomotor behavior. Following the mass extinction event at the Cretaceous–Paleogene boundary (K-Pg), a large diversity of plesiadapiform families were documented beginning at the Torrejonian NALMA. Research has shown that T. wilsoni is one of the largest palaechthonids (at 741g) and is reconstructed as being more frugivorous than other palaechthonids.

== History of discovery ==
The extinction of dinosaurs at the Cretaceous-Paleogene boundary sparked new opportunities for mammalian diversification. The K-Pg boundary is marked by what is termed an “iridium anomaly” and can be seen in the United States in the San Juan Basin of New Mexico and southwest Colorado. For over a century, paleontologists have collected a plethora of different taxa from the Nacimiento Formation, San Juan Basin, New Mexico, including Torrejonian mammals. However, primates from the Torrejon beds had not been known until they were first discovered in the Angel Peak Basin by Robert W. Wilson and a field crew in 1948. In 1949, paleontologists C. Lewis Gazin and Franklin Pierce uncovered multiple specimens belonging to a new genus and named it Torrejonia wilsoni. Additional fossil material was uncovered in 1969 allowing G.F. Gunnell to draw a comparison to a later, larger species from the Tiffanian NALMA, Torrejonia sirokyi.

== Description ==
The holotype of T. wilsoni (USNM 25255) preserves the left ramus of the mandible with P3-M2 present. T. wilsoni is larger than the paromomyid Paromomys maturus, Palaechthon alticuspis and Plesiolestes problematicus. The M2 is very close in size to the plesiadapid Pronothodectes simpsoni. More recent studies with additional fossil material gave researchers a better understanding of the dentition of this species. The holotype is missing a metaconid, and a clear mesoconid. Portions of the jaw in specimen NMMNH P-54500 suggest a lower dental formula of 2-1-3-3 and that it housed a canine rather than a P1. They have a lanceolate and dorsomedially oriented I1 and a canine that is considerably larger than the P2.

== Taxonomy ==
Torrejonia belongs to the family Palaechthonidae and represents a group of plesiadapiforms thought to be the sister group of Paromomyidae. Differences in skeletal morphology provide evidence for the splitting of these taxa into two separate families. The dental formula of Torrejonia has been highly contested which has made its taxonomic placement unstable. Torrejonia was originally thought to belong to the family Paromomyidae as some dental characteristics share a close resemblance to species in this family. Recent studies have shown that Torrejonia belongs to the family Palaechthonidae. Additionally, analysis of the partial skeleton of T. wilsoni suggests that palaechthonids were arboreal and had capabilities for clinging and climbing on vertical supports like other plesiadapiforms. The anterior dentition is similar to other plesiolestine palaechthonids such as Plesiolestes problematicus and Plesiolestes nacimienti, in having a flattened, broad, and dorsomedially oriented lower central incisor. T. wilsoni also has a large, lower canine and smaller second lower premolar similar to other plesiolestines, and it appears to be more closely related to paromomyids than to Plesiolestes nacimienti due to its arboreal nature.

== Paleoecology and functional morphology ==
Given its limb morphology, it has been suggested that Torrejonia was well-adapted to an arboreal climbing lifestyle. Analysis of the forelimb provides evidence for a mobile shoulder, a habitually flexed forearm, considerable supination and pronation of the forearm and hand, and manual grasping. Analysis of the hindlimb suggests wide ranges of abduction and lateral rotation at the hip joint, a habitually flexed thigh and knee, and mobile ankle joints for inversion and eversion.
