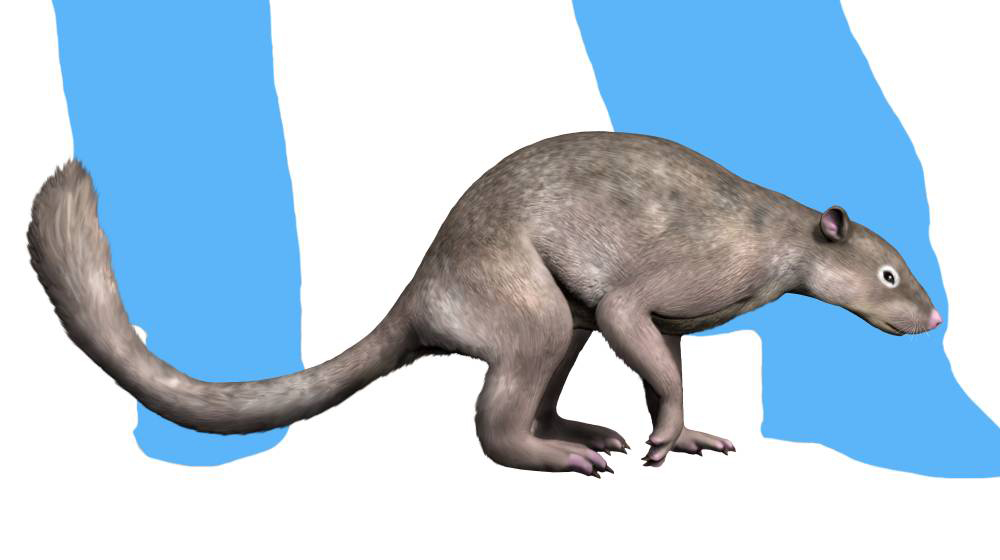
- Restoration of Ignacius graybullianus

Scientific classification
- Kingdom: Animalia
- Phylum: Chordata
- Class: Mammalia
- Order: †Plesiadapiformes
- Family: †Paromomyidae
- Tribe: †Phenacolemurini
- Genus: †Ignacius; Matthew and Granger, 1921

Type species
- †Ignacius frugivorus Matthew and Granger, 1921

Species
- †I. clarkforkensis Bloch et al. 2007; †I. dawsonae Miller et al. 2023; †I. fremontensis Gazin 1971; †I. glenbowensis Scott et al. 2023; †I. graybullianus Bown and Rose 1976; †I. mckennai Miller et al. 2023

= Ignacius =

Ignacius Temporal range: Mid Paleocene-Late Eocene (Torrejonian-Chadronian) ~61.7–33.9 Ma

Extinct genus of mammals

Ignacius is a genus of extinct mammal from the early Cenozoic era. This genus is present in the fossil record from around 62-33 Ma (late Torrejonian-Chadronian North American Land Mammals Ages). The earliest known specimens of Ignacius come from the Torrejonian of the Fort Union Formation, Wyoming and the most recent known specimens from Ellesmere Island in northern Canada. Ignacius is one of ten genera within the family Paromomyidae, the longest living family of any plesiadapiforms, persisting for around 30 Ma during the Paleocene and Eocene epochs. The analyses of postcranial fossils by paleontologists suggest that members of the family Paromomyidae, including the genus Ignacius, most likely possessed adaptations for arboreality.

== Taxonomy ==
As of 2022, there were four valid species within the genus Ignacius: I. frugivorus, I. fremontensis, I. clarkforkensis, and I. graybullianus. There are also two described species of Ignacius from the Arctic of Canada. The type species for the genus Ignacius is I. frugivorus and was found at the Mason Pocket locality in Colorado. The holotype specimen (AMNH 17368), published in 1921 by Matthew and Granger, consists of an upper jaw with the canine, fourth premolar, first molar, and second molar.

The genus Ignacius is situated within the family Paromomyidae and the order Plesiadapiformes. The relationship between plesiadapiforms and the modern group Euarchonta (Dermoptera, Scandentia, and Primates) is still under debate by paleontologists with some suggesting a closer relationship with primates, and others suggesting a closer relationship with dermopterans.

The genus Ignacius was found to be synonymous with the closely related genus, Phenacolemur, by G.G. Simpson in 1935 but revived by Bown and Rose in 1976.

== Description ==
Ignacius graybullianus possessed an osseous canal for the internal carotid nerves, as well as for the promontorial artery, that ran across the lateral portion of the promontory of the tympanic cavity.

Ignacius, along with the other plesiadapiforms, possess large, procumbent lower incisors convergent with those found in rodents, however, unlike rodents, the incisors of plesiadapiforms were not continuously growing. Most species of Ignacius have a 1.0.1.3 lower dental formula although some specimens retain a small P3. Compared with other paromomyids, Ignacius has small P4s in relation to M1s with relatively low crowned upper and lower molars. The lower molars have reduced cusps, forming an almost continuous crest along the talonid basin. The jaw of Ignacius is deep in comparison to tooth crown height, a feature distinct to this genus. Upper molars possess strong crests in a distinct 'v' shape between the paracone and metacone.

== Species ==
Ignacius frugivorus was the first species of Ignacius to be described, in 1921. Ignacius frugivorus and I. fremontensis are the oldest species of Ignacius, both found in the Shotgun Local fauna of the Fort Union formation, Wyoming. Until 2023, the youngest known specimen of Ignacius was found in the Chadron formation of North Dakota and was represented by a single P4 (2). There is not enough material to identify this specimen to the species level. Ignacius frugivorus and I. fremontensis are distinguishable from one another based primarily on the size of lower fourth premolars. Ignacius fremontensis displays a significantly smaller P4 in relation to M1 when compared to I. frugivorus. Ignacius clarkforkensis differs from other species in the retention of a single rooted P2 (5). Ignacius graybullianus has more quadrangular upper molars whereas the other three species are more triangular. Strong v-shaped postparacone/prematacone cristae are present in I. graybullianus. These cristae are less obliquely oriented in the other three taxa. Ignacius mckennai and Ignacius dawsonae are the largest known species in the genus, living much further north and much later than the other known species, being found in Early Eocene deposits from Ellesmere Island.

== Paleoenvironment and geographic range ==
Ignacius occupied a broad geographic range during the early Cenozoic era in North America, ranging from Texas, to the Canadian Arctic. During the early Cenozoic, North America experienced multiple climatic changes with the warmest mean annual temperatures (around 16 °C, 60 °F) occurring during the Paleocene-Eocene Thermal Maximum (PETM) at around 55 Ma. During the Eocene Climatic Optimum (c. 53 Ma) there was a correlated diversification of flora creating a complex, warm-temperate to subtropical habitat over much of interior North America. The environment of Arctic Canada would have represented a temperate environment with winter temperatures rarely dropping below freezing. The late Cretaceous and early Tertiary saw a diversification of angiosperms providing the opportunity for arboreal mammals to utilize the fruit, seed, exudate, and flower resources of these plants. The environment of interior North America, extending into the Canadian Arctic, would have provided habitable ecosystems for these arboreal mammals to thrive and diversify.

== Functional morphology ==
Analysis of postcranial fossils of Ignacius suggest they were specialized for vertical climbing and clinging on tree trunks as well as for more agile arboreality than seen in other plesiadapiforms. Some researchers have also hypothesized based on analysis of hand bone morphology, that they possessed gliding adaptations like those of modern-day flying lemurs (Order Dermoptera). Further anatomical analysis of cranial synapomorphies, also suggest a close relationship between dermopterans and plesiadapiforms.

Evidence for vertical climbing can be seen in the morphology of the humerus, femur, and tarsal bones which are consistent with increased flexibility of the shoulder, elbow, hip, knee, and ankle joints. These features also suggest powerful flexion of the digits for grasping large tree trunks as well as small diameter support branches. The features listed above are seen in many plesiadapiforms, but some anatomical features set paromomyids apart in being more adept for arboreal living. Flexible lumbar vertebrae as well as increased surface area on the innominate and femur for the origin and insertion of gluteal muscles, suggest paromomyids were capable of powerful bounding across tree branches.

The large, procumbent incisors and reduced shearing crests of Paromomyids, especially Ignacius and Phenacolemur, suggest a diet specialized for feeding on exudates, comparable to the adaptions seen in extant callitrichine primates and Petaurus, a marsupial sugar-glider.
