= Edworthia =

Edworthia Temporal range: 61.5 Ma Early Paleocene

Scientific classification
- Kingdom: Animalia
- Phylum: Chordata
- Class: Mammalia
- Infraclass: Placentalia
- Order: †Plesiadapiformes
- Family: †Paromomyidae
- Genus: †Edworthia; Fox, Scott & Rankin, 2010

Species
- E. greggi Scott et al., 2023; E. lerbekmoi Fox, Scott & Rankin, 2010 (type)

Edworthia is an extinct genus of paromomyid plesiadapiform which existed in Alberta, Canada, during the early Paleocene (middle Torrejonian age). It was first named by Richard C. Fox, Craig S. Scott and Brian D. Rankin in 2010 and the type species is Edworthia lerbekmoi. Edworthia was described from a recently discovered locality in the Paskapoo Formation, exposed at a road cut in Edworthy Municipal Park.

== Palaeobiology ==
=== Palaeoecology ===
Dental topographic analysis has recovered E. lerbekmoi as an omnivore with a tendency towards frugivory.
