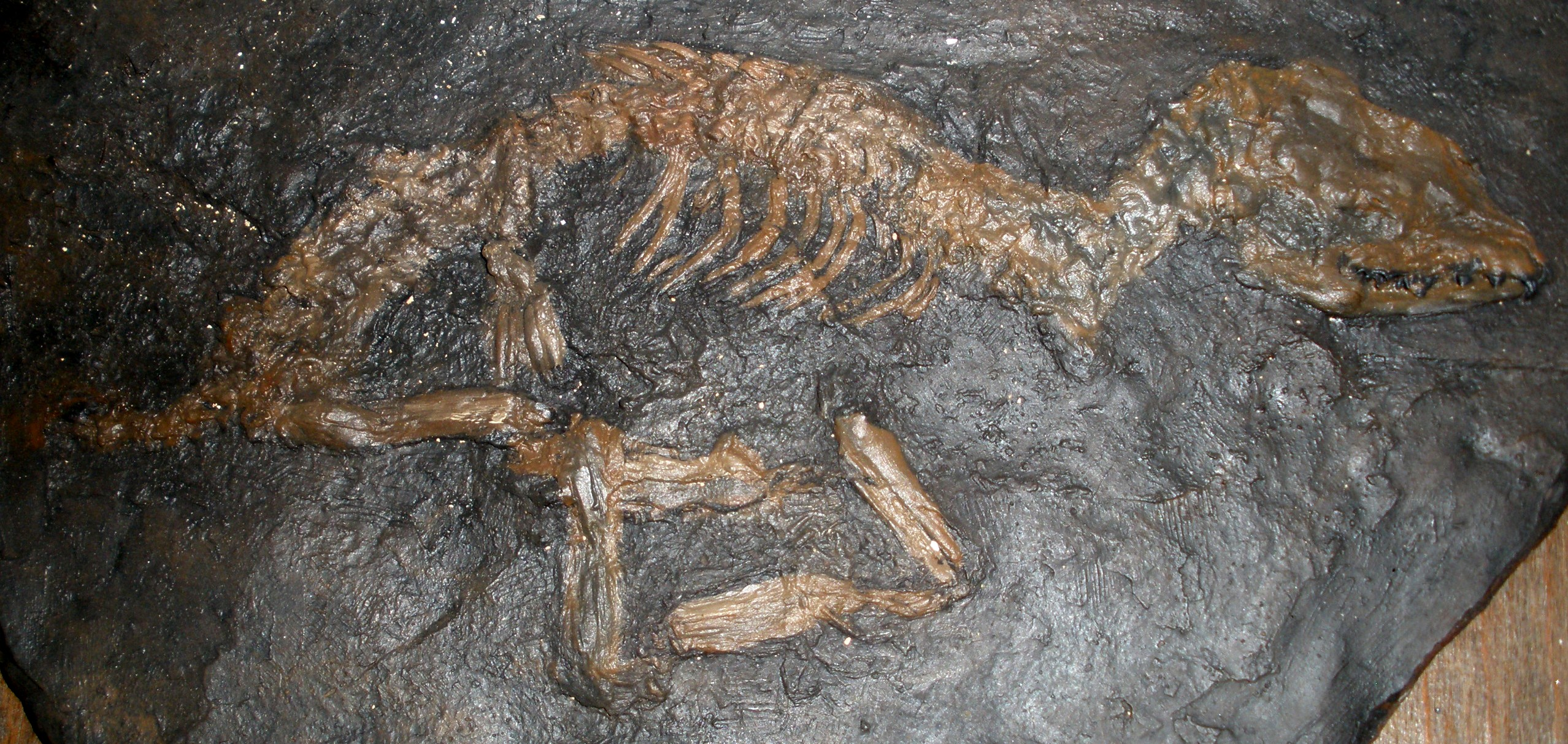
- Fossil of Lesmesodon edingeri

Scientific classification
- Kingdom: Animalia
- Phylum: Chordata
- Class: Mammalia
- Infraclass: Placentalia
- Order: †Hyaenodonta
- Superfamily: †Hyaenodontoidea
- Clade: †Proviverrinae
- Genus: †Lesmesodon; Morlo & Habersetzer, 1999

Type species
- †Lesmesodon edingeri Springhorn, 1982

Species
- †L. behnkeae (Morlo & Habersetzer, 1999); †L. edingeri (Springhorn, 1982); †L. gunnelli (Solé, 2021)

Synonyms
- synonyms of species: L. edingeri: Proviverra edingeri (Springhorn, 1982)

= Lesmesodon =

Lesmesodon Temporal range: 50.8–46.3 Ma Early to Middle Eocene

Extinct genus of mammals

Lesmesodon ("tooth from Messel") is an extinct genus of placental mammals from extinct clade Proviverrinae within extinct superfamily Hyaenodontoidea (in extinct order Hyaenodonta), that lived during the Early to Middle Eocene. It was found in France and in the Messel Pit in Germany.

== Description ==
Lesmesodon was a weasel-sized mammal.

== Palaeobiology ==
=== Palaeoecology ===
Lesmesodon has a chewing cycle and pattern of tooth occlusion similar to modern insectivorous predators, and was most likely also an insectivore.

=== Life history ===
As it grew, Lesmesodon replaced its dP_{2} after the eruption of its M_{1} and M_{2}, which is the ancestral condition in Hyaenodonta.
