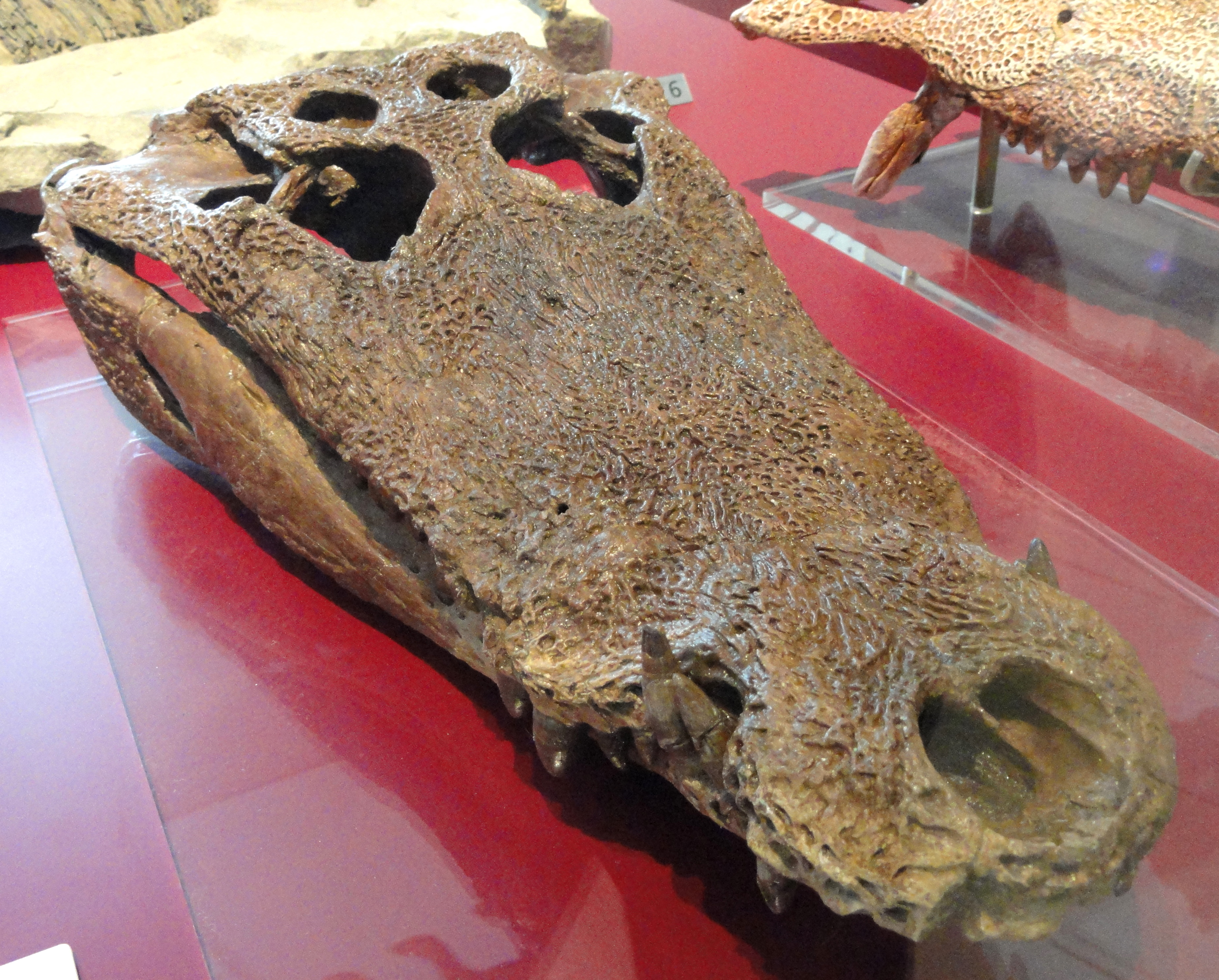
- Leidyosuchus canadensis skull

Scientific classification
- Kingdom: Animalia
- Phylum: Chordata
- Class: Reptilia
- Clade: Pseudosuchia
- Clade: Crocodylomorpha
- Clade: Eusuchia
- Genus: †Leidyosuchus; Lambe, 1907

Species
- †Leidyosuchus canadensis Lambe, 1907 (type)

= Leidyosuchus =

Leidyosuchus Temporal range: Late Cretaceous: Campanian, 77.9–72.1 Ma

Genus of reptiles

Leidyosuchus (meaning "Leidy's crocodile") is an extinct genus of eusuchian, either an alligatoroid crocodilian or a stem-group crocodilian, from the Late Cretaceous of Alberta. It was named in 1907 by Lawrence Lambe, and the type species is L. canadensis. It is known from a number of specimens from the middle Campanian age Dinosaur Park Formation. It was a medium-sized alligatoroid, with a maximum skull length greater than 40 centimeters (16 in).

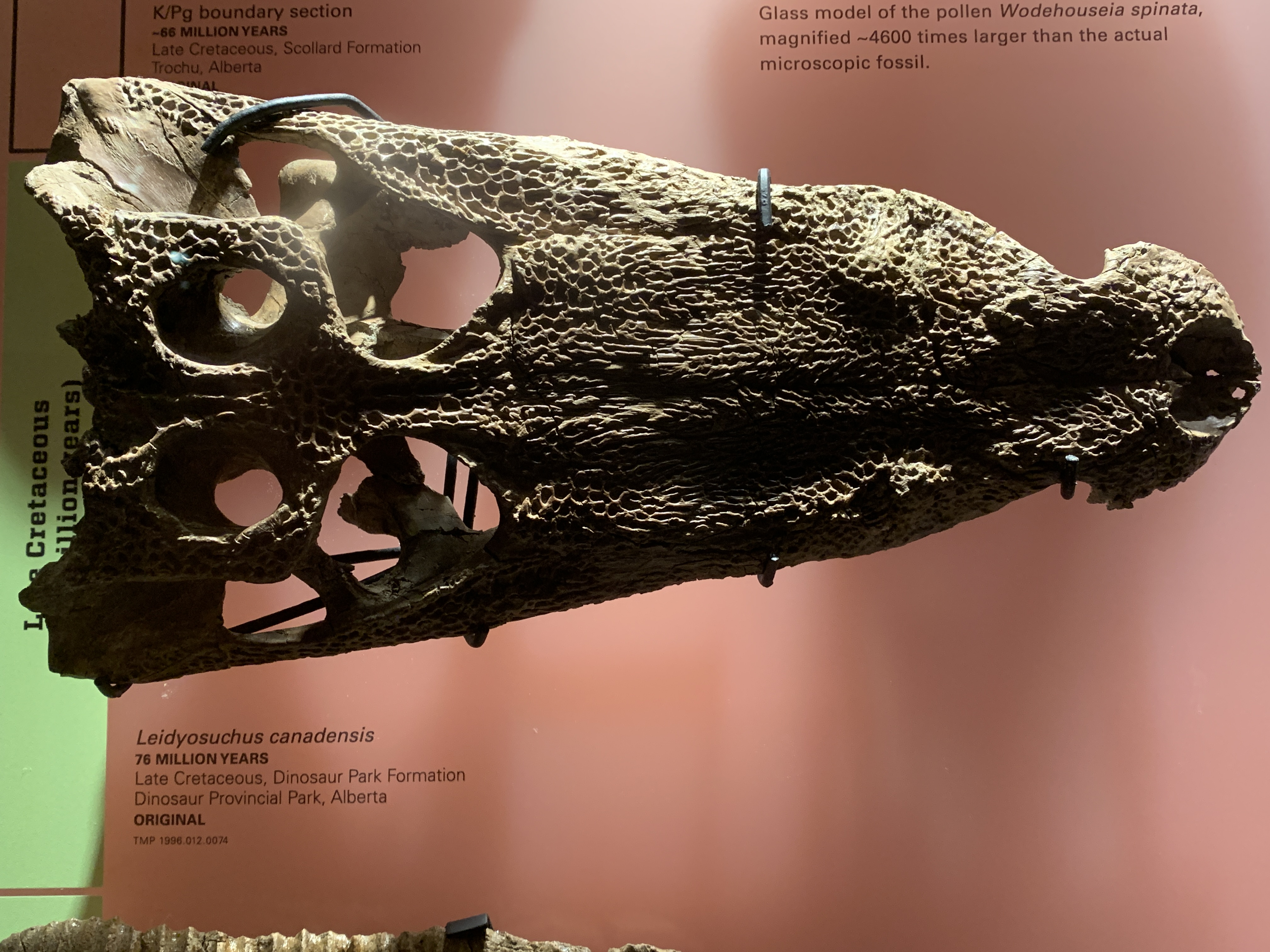
Leidyosuchus canadensis skull dorsal view.

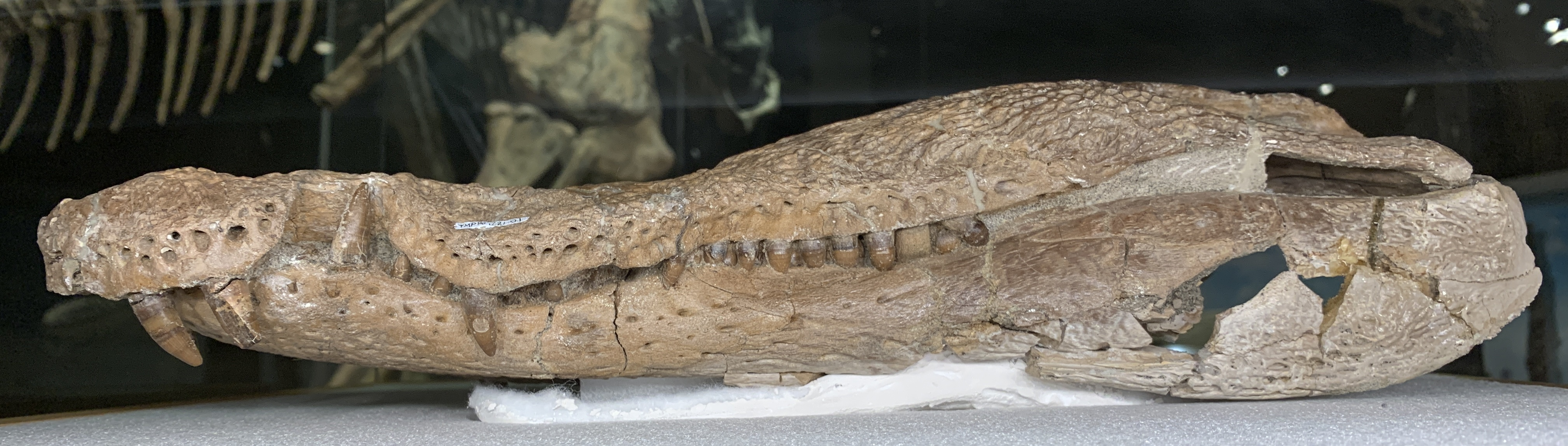
Leidyosuchus canadensis skull lateral view.

A number of species had been assigned to this genus over the years, including: L. acutidentatus (Sternberg, 1932), from the Paleocene of Saskatchewan; L. formidabilis (Erickson, 1976), from the Paleocene of North Dakota and Wyoming; L. gilmorei (Mook, 1942), from the Campanian of Alberta; L. multidentatus (Mook, 1930); L. riggsi (Schmidt, 1938); L. sternbergii (Gilmore, 1910), from the Maastrichtian (Late Cretaceous) of Colorado, Montana, North Dakota, South Dakota, and Wyoming; and L. wilsoni (Mook, 1959), from the Eocene of Wyoming. However, in 1997 Chris Brochu reevaluated the genus and reassigned most of the species, transferring L. acutidentatus, L. formidabilis, L. sternbergii, and L. wilsoni to the new genus Borealosuchus, and L. multidentatus to the new genus Listrognathosuchus, proposing L. gilmorei as a synonym of L. canadensis, and finding L. riggsi to be too fragmentary to be determinable.

== Classification ==
Leidyosuchus is one of the basal-most members of the superfamily Alligatoroidea. Leidyosuchus's placement within Alligatoroidea can be shown in the cladogram below, based on a 2018 tip dating study by Lee & Yates that simultaneously used morphological, molecular (DNA sequencing), and stratigraphic (fossil age) data.

- Crocodylia
  - Alligatoroidea
    - Leidyosuchus†
    - - Diplocynodontinae†
        Diplocynodon†
      - Globidonta
        - - Stangerochampsa†
          - Brachychampsa†
        - - Navajosuchus†
          - Alligatoridae
            - Caimaninae
              - - Caiman
                - Melanosuchus
              - Paleosuchus
            - Alligatorinae
              Alligator
  - - extinct basal Crocodilians† (including Mekosuchinae†)
    - Longirostres
      - Crocodyloidea
        - extinct basal crocodiles†
        - Crocodylidae
          - Crocodylus
          - - Mecistops
            - Osteolaemus
      - Gavialoidea
        - extinct basal Gavialoids†
        - Gavialidae
          - Gavialis
          - Tomistoma

In a 2025 study, however, Jules D. Walter and colleagues argue that many character states previously thought to be diagnostic for alligatoroids were actually much more widespread. In their analysis several genera traditionally viewed as basal alligatoroids, among them Leidyosuchus, were found to not only fall outside of Alligatoroidea but to not even be true crocodilians, instead representing derived non-crocodilian eusuchians. Leidyosuchus was recovered as having split from the lineage leading up to Crocodilia before Deinosuchus and the terrestrial Planocraniidae.

- - Leidyosuchus
  - - Deinosuchus
    - - Planocraniidae
      - Crocodilia
        - Longirostres
        - Alligatoroidea
          - Orientalosuchina
          - - Alligatorinae
            - Caimaninae
