= Plagiomene =

Plagiomene Temporal range: 55.8–50.3 Ma Early Eocene

Scientific classification
- Kingdom: Animalia
- Phylum: Chordata
- Class: Mammalia
- Order: Dermoptera (?)
- Family: †Plagiomenidae
- Genus: †Plagiomene; Matthew, 1918
- Species: †P. multicuspis

Binomial name
- †Plagiomene multicuspis Matthew, 1918

Extinct genus of mammals

Plagiomene is an extinct genus of early flying lemur-like mammal from North America that lived during the Eocene epoch.
