= Dracontolestes =

Dracontolestes Temporal range: 63.3 to 61.7 Ma

Scientific classification
- Domain: Eukaryota
- Kingdom: Animalia
- Phylum: Chordata
- Class: Mammalia
- Order: Dermoptera
- Family: †Mixodectidae
- Genus: †Dracontolestes; Gazin, 1941
- Species: †D. aphantus

Binomial name
- †Dracontolestes aphantus Gazin, 1941

Genus of extinct insectivorous mammals

Dracontolestes is a genus of extinct insectivorous mammals in the family Mixodectidae. It is known only from a fragment of fossilized mandible found in Dragon Canyon, Utah.

== Species ==
There is only one known species in the genus, Dracontolestes aphantus.
