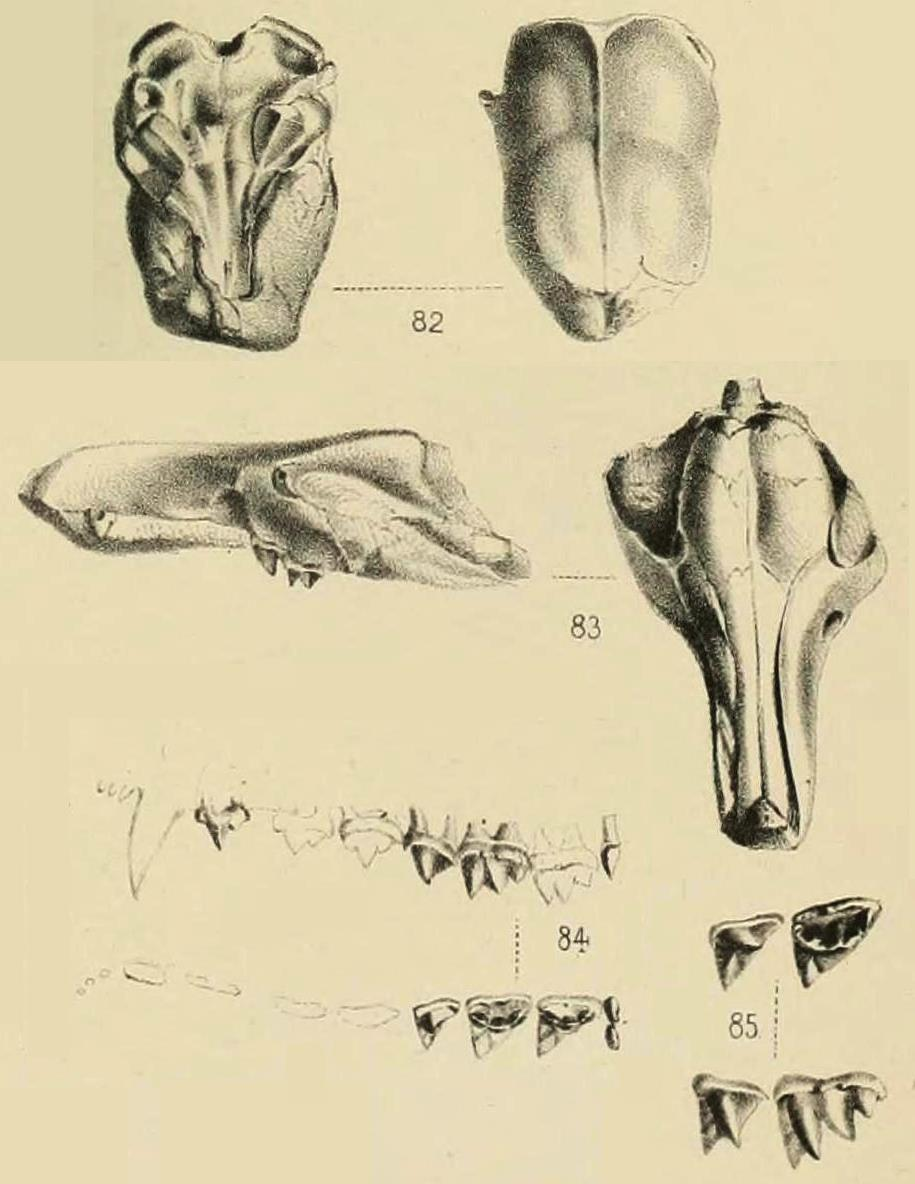
- Proviverra typica skull

Scientific classification
- Kingdom: Animalia
- Phylum: Chordata
- Class: Mammalia
- Order: †Hyaenodonta
- Superfamily: †Hyaenodontoidea
- Clade: †Proviverrinae
- Genus: †Proviverra; Rutimeyer, 1862

Type species
- †Proviverra typica Rutimeyer, 1862

Synonyms
- synonyms of genus: Prorhyzaena (Rütimeyer, 1891); synonyms of species: P. typica: Prorhyzaena egerkingiae (Rütimeyer, 1891)

= Proviverra =

Proviverra Temporal range: 46.3–41.2 Ma Middle Eocene

Extinct genus of mammals

Proviverra ("before civet") is an extinct genus of placental mammals from the extinct clade Proviverrinae within the extinct superfamily Hyaenodontoidea, itself within the extinct order Hyaenodonta, that lived during the Middle Eocene in Europe.

== Description ==
Dental topographic and three dimensional geometric morphometric analysis shows that Proviverra typica had a basal carnassialised dentition, contrasting with the derived carnassials of later hyaenodonts such as Hyaenodon filholi and Pterodon dasyuroides.
