= Kimbetohia =

Kimbetohia Temporal range: Maastrichtian–Paleocene

Scientific classification
- Kingdom: Animalia
- Phylum: Chordata
- Class: Mammalia
- Order: †Multituberculata
- Family: †Ptilodontidae
- Genus: †Kimbetohia; Simpson, 1936

Species
- K. campi Simpson, 1936; K. mziae Middleton and Dewar, 2004

Extinct family of mammals

Kimbetohia is a genus of mammal belonging to the extinct order Multituberculata. It lived from the Upper Cretaceous to the Paleocene period in the United States.

== Taxonomy ==
Two species are known. The type species, Kimbetohia campi, has been found in New Mexico, Utah, and Wyoming, in the Nacimiento Formation of the San Juan Basin. The deposits date from the Maastrichtian stage of the Upper Cretaceous to the Puercan stage of the Paleocene. Some material associated with this species was referred to as Clemensodon megaloba, by D. W. Krause in 1992. The second species, K. mzaie, is known from deposits of the Denver Formation, in Colorado, which has been dated to the Puercan stage of the Lower Paleocene.
