= Agerinia =

Agerinia Temporal range: Early Eocene ~54.3–40.4 Ma

Scientific classification
- Kingdom: Animalia
- Phylum: Chordata
- Class: Mammalia
- Order: Primates
- Suborder: Strepsirrhini
- Family: †Notharctidae
- Subfamily: †Cercamoniinae
- Genus: †Agerinia; Crusafont-Pairo & Golpe-Posse 1973

Species
- A. roselli Crusafont-Pairo & Golpe-Posse 1973 (type); A. smithorum Femenias-Gual et al. 2016; A. marandati Femenias-Gual et al. 2017; A. yaminae Godinot, 2026

Extinct genus of primates

Agerinia is a genus of adapiform primate known from Early Eocene fossils found in Europe. Fossils have been found in the Grès d'Assignan, Lignites de Soissonais, Calcare d'Agel Formatios, and "Sables Bleutés du Haut-Var" formations of France, the Corçà and Escanilla formations of Spain, and the Kuldana Formation of Pakistan.
