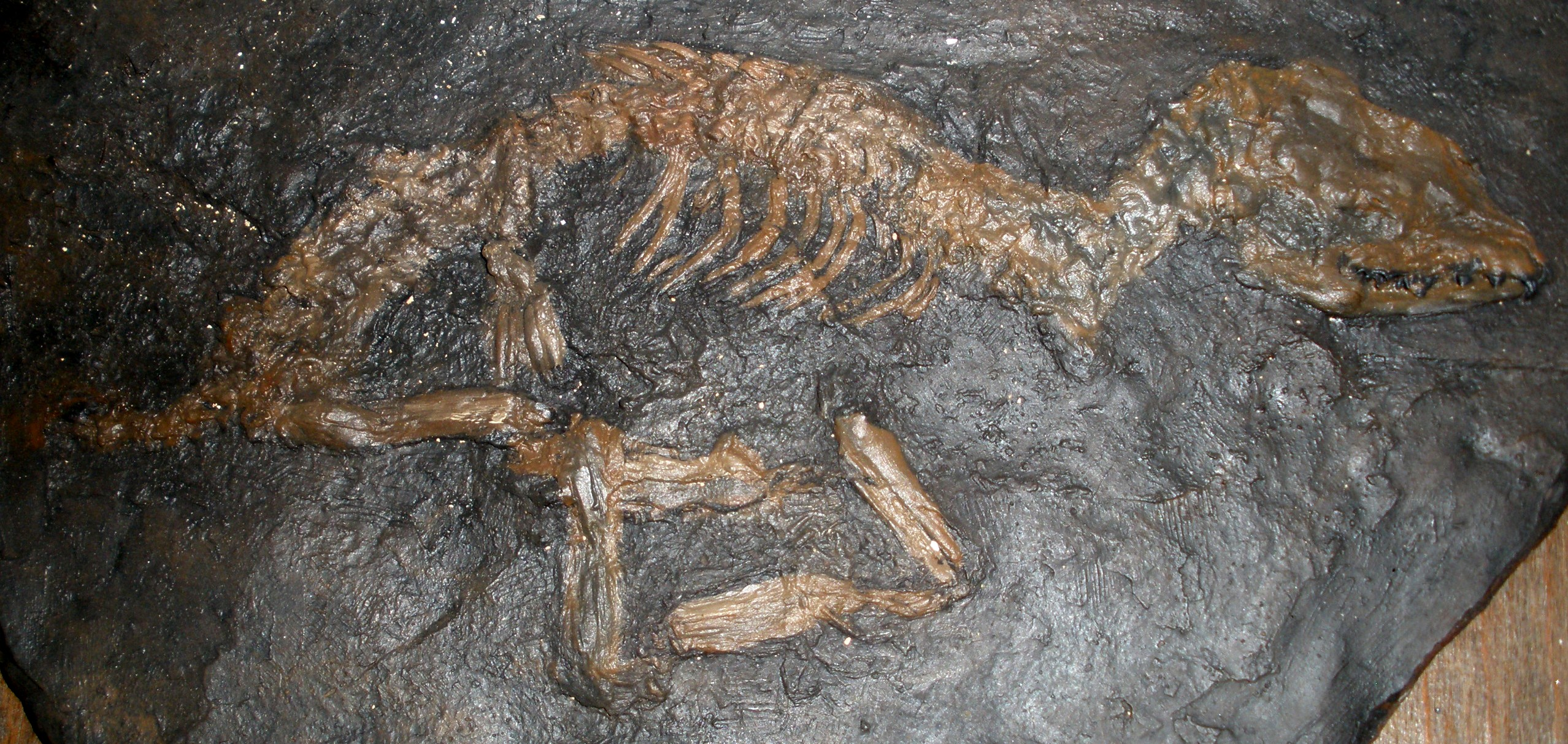
- Fossil of Lesmesodon edingeri
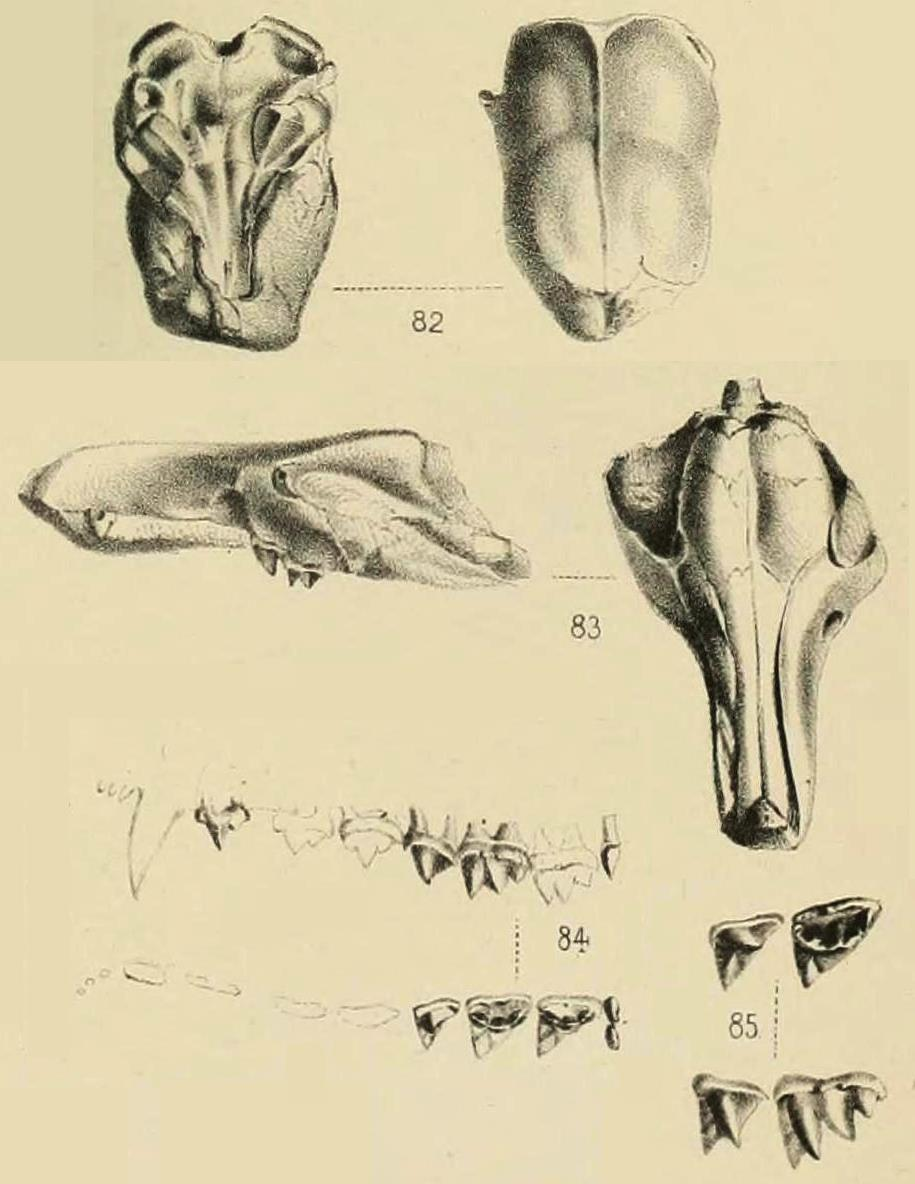
- Skull of Proviverra typica

Scientific classification
- Kingdom: Animalia
- Phylum: Chordata
- Class: Mammalia
- Order: †Hyaenodonta
- Superfamily: †Hyaenodontoidea
- Clade: †Proviverrinae; Schlosser, 1886

Type genus
- †Proviverra Rütimeyer, 1862

Genera
- [see classification]

Synonyms
- list of synonyms: Proviverrida (Haeckel, 1895); Proviverridae (Schlosser, 1886); Proviverrini (Van Valen, 1965); Stypolophinae (Trouessart, 1885)

= Proviverrinae =

Proviverrinae Temporal range: Early to Late Eocene56.0–34.0 Ma Suspected Late Paleocene origin

Extinct clade of mammals

Proviverrinae ("before civets") is an extinct clade of placental mammals within superfamily Hyaenodontoidea in extinct order Hyaenodonta. Fossil remains of these mammals are known from early to late Eocene deposits in Europe. The clade consisted of at least 20 genera and 30 species, and were the most diverse group of hyaenodonts in Europe until the Late Eocene. Their decline was thought to have been the result with of competition with carnivorans, hyaenodontines, and hyainailourines. The last proviverrine would go extinct at the end of the Eocene during the Grande Coupure.

== Classification and phylogeny ==
=== Taxonomy ===
- Clade: †Proviverrinae (Wortman, 1902)
  - Genus: †Minimovellentodon (Solé, 2014)
    - †Minimovellentodon russelli (Solé, 2014)
  - Genus: †Morlodon (Solé, 2013)
    - †Morlodon vellerei (Solé, 2013)
  - Genus: †Parvagula (Lange-Badré, 1987)
    - †Parvagula palulae (Lange-Badré, 1987)
  - (unranked): †Allopterodon/Proviverra clade
    - Genus: †Allopterodon (Ginsburg, 1977)
      - †Allopterodon bulbosus (Lange-Badré, 1979)
      - †Allopterodon minor (Filhol, 1877)
      - †Allopterodon torvidus (Van Valen, 1965)
    - Genus: †Lesmesodon (Morlo & Habersetzer, 1999)
      - †Lesmesodon behnkeae (Morlo & Habersetzer, 1999)
      - †Lesmesodon edingeri (Springhorn, 1982)
      - †Lesmesodon gunnelli (Solé, 2021)
    - Genus: †Proviverra (Rütimeyer, 1862)
      - †Proviverra typica (Rütimeyer, 1862)
