= Plagiomenidae =

Plagiomenidae Temporal range: early Paleocene (Torrejonian) – early Eocene (Wasatchian)

Scientific classification
- Kingdom: Animalia
- Phylum: Chordata
- Class: Mammalia
- Order: Dermoptera (?)
- Family: †Plagiomenidae; Matthew, 1918

Genera
- †Ellesmene; †Elpidophorus; †Plagiomene; †Planetetherium; †Worlandia

Extinct family of mammals

Plagiomenidae is an extinct family of mammals from the Paleocene–Eocene of North America. Mainly known from teeth and jaw bones, plagiomenids are often regarded as early members of Dermoptera, the order which contains the modern colugos or "flying lemurs" of southeast Asia. Some studies argue that plagiomenids are too specialized to be close relatives of colugos, though others continue to uphold a relationship between the two groups. No fossils are known beyond the skull, so it is unknown whether plagiomenids could glide like their potential modern relatives.

Plagiomenids were sometimes suggested to be descendants of mixodectids or ancestors to tarkadectines, two other extinct groups of primate-like North American mammals. A direct line of ancestry is no longer supported for either. Mixodectids are a distinct family of non-gliding euarchontans (mammals in the vicinity of the split between colugos and primates). Tarkadectines are probably a subfamily of Omomyidae (early relatives of tarsiers).

== Description ==
Plagiomenid teeth and skull fossils are similar to colugos in some respects, as well as more distant mammals such as desmans and elephant shrews. The two to three lower incisors are large, with the first being the largest. The lower incisors split into mitten-shaped crowns akin to some elephant shrews. By comparison, colugo incisors split further into toothcombs with many small tines. Plagiomenids have four premolars and three molars on each side of the jaw, though the last two premolars are molarized (acquiring a similar shape to the molars). The molars and molarized premolars are together known as molariform teeth. Like colugos, the molariforms are crenulated (strongly wrinkled) and partially split by a sideways furrow down the middle of each tooth. The upper molariforms lack hypocones, while the lower molariforms have particularly large cusps in the talonid region (the rear "heel" of the tooth). Like colugos, plagiomenids were probably herbivores relying on sideways shearing and grinding motions in their teeth.

Plagiomenids also have a few unique traits not present in colugos. For example, the upper molariforms have many stylar cusps (small cusps along the outer rim of the tooth), alongside enlarged paraconules and metaconules. Each molariform tooth has a skewed profile, where the inner half of each tooth is shifted forwards relative to its outer half. The snout is narrow, and the back of the jaw has a deep coronoid process and small gonial area, opposite from colugos. Apart from teeth and jaws, Plagiomene also preserves a fragmentary braincase which is very different in structure compared to colugos. The auditory bulla (a bony dome which protects the middle and inner ear) is unusually complex, with up to seven components encasing a porous tympanic cavity.
