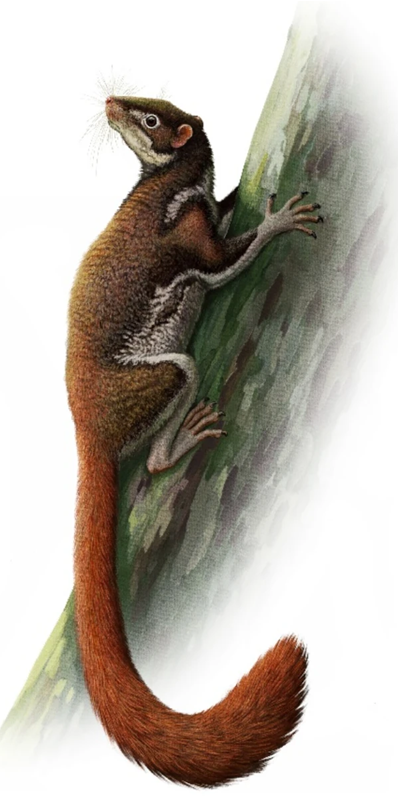
- Life restoration of Mixodectes pungens

Scientific classification
- Kingdom: Animalia
- Phylum: Chordata
- Class: Mammalia
- Infraclass: Placentalia
- Grandorder: Euarchonta
- Family: †Mixodectidae; Cope, 1883

Genera
- †Dracontolestes; †Eudaemonema; †Mixodectes

= Mixodectidae =

Mixodectidae Temporal range: Late Paleocene

Extinct family of mammals

Mixodectidae (from Ancient Greek μιξο (mixo) "mixed", and δεκτες (dektes) "biter") is an extinct family of placental mammals from the Paleocene of North America. They are usually considered euarchontans (relatives of primates, treeshrews, and colugos).

A complete skeleton of Mixodectes reveals that mixodectids were adapted for an arboreal (tree-living) lifestyle, with sharp claws and flexible arms and ankles, useful for clambering among large trunks and branches. Based on the shape of their teeth, mixodectids were probably omnivores with some ability to feed on leaves. Mixodectes was large by the standard of Paleocene euarchontans, reaching up to 1.3 kilograms (2.9 lb).

== Description ==
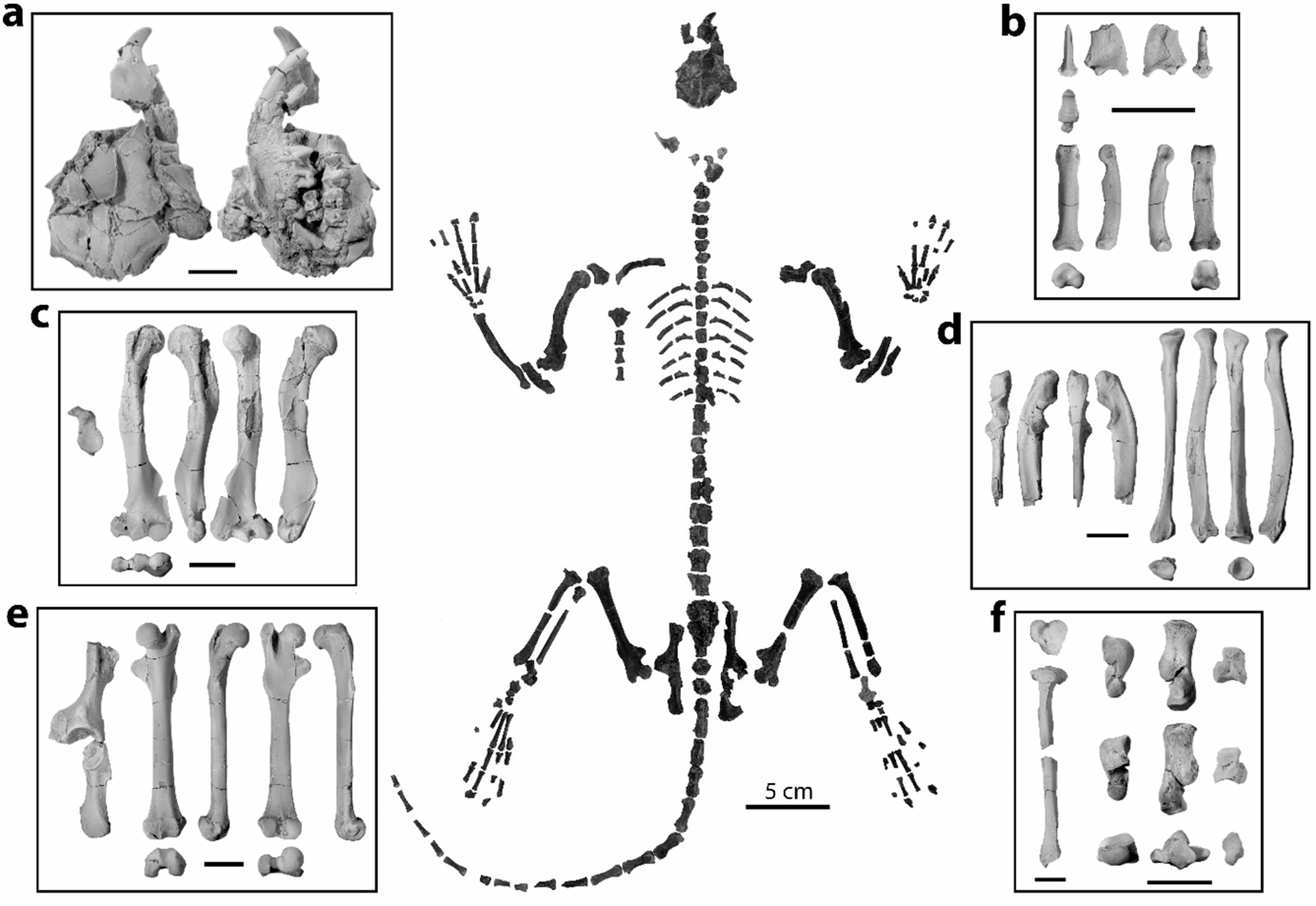
Skeleton of Mixodectes as viewed from below, with insets showing skull and limb bones in multiple views.

At various times mixodectids have been compared to rodents, "insectivores", and, most frequently, dermopterans (colugos or "flying lemurs"). A 2025 study based on new postcranial fossils estimated that mixodectids are euarchontans within or near the clade Primatomorpha (which contains primates and colugos). Their exact affinities among early euarchontans is still debated.

Preserved features of the teeth and skull give an idea of mixodectid dietary requirements. Their rodent-like dental pattern was similar to that of the multituberculates, with a pair of large, strong, and forward-directed incisors and a row of multi-cusped and low-crowned premolars and molars.

Torrejonian (Middle Paleocene) mixodectids had a dental set-up similar to the oldest plagiomenids, and were sometimes regarded as an ancestral or sister group of the latter. For many years Elipdophorus, the oldest plagiomenid, was classified as a member of Mixodectidae, but it was finally regarded as more closely related to plagiomenids in the 1970s based on its specialized teeth. Though the relation between Mixodectidae and other early placental mammals from the "insectivore-primate transition" remain unclear, clearly a number of the archaic mixodectid dental features seem to foreshadow the more derived conditions of plagiomenids. Furthermore, the postcranial skeleton of Mixodectes shows arboreal specialization similar to those of plesiadapids and dermopterans, supporting their inclusion within Euarchonta.

== See also ==
- Colugo
- Planetetherium
