= Acidomomys =

Scientific classification
- Domain: Eukaryota
- Kingdom: Animalia
- Phylum: Chordata
- Class: Mammalia
- Order: Plesiadapiformes
- Family: †Paromomyidae
- Genus: †Acidomomys

Extinct genus of mammals

Acidomomys is a plesiadapiform mammal of the family Paromomyidae, a precursor to the primates or very closely related to them.

Acidomomys hebeticus fossils were described from the late Paleocene, Clarkforkian freshwater limestones of Clarks Fork Basin, Wyoming. They appear to have an unusual dental eruption sequence, differing from Plesiadapis and other primitive primates and possibly indicating differences in facial appearance or life history.
