= Phoxomylus =

Phoxomylus Temporal range: 60.2 Ma Late Paleocene

Scientific classification
- Kingdom: Animalia
- Phylum: Chordata
- Class: Mammalia
- Infraclass: Placentalia
- Order: †Plesiadapiformes
- Family: †Palaechthonidae
- Subfamily: †Plesiolestinae
- Genus: †Phoxomylus; Fox, 2011

Type species
- †P. puncticuspis Fox, 2011

Extinct genus of mammals

Phoxomylus is an extinct genus of palaechthonid plesiadapiform which lived in Alberta, Canada, during the late Paleocene (earliest Tiffanian age). It was first named by Richard C. Fox in 2011 and the type species is Phoxomylus puncticuspis. The holotype was exposed in the Paskapoo Formation by Gordon P. Youzwyshyn on 10 July 1988.
