= Aletodon =

Aletodon Temporal range: Middle Tiffanian - Clarkforkian

Scientific classification
- Kingdom: Animalia
- Phylum: Chordata
- Class: Mammalia
- Infraclass: Placentalia
- Family: †Hyopsodontidae
- Genus: †Aletodon; Gingerich, 1977

Type species
- †Aletodon gunnelli

Extinct genus of mammals

Aletodon is a genus of ground dwelling insectivores, now extinct. The genus flourished from around 58.7 to 55.8 Ma. It was native to Colorado, Wyoming, and western North Dakota.

== Species ==
There are currently 4 recognized species in this genus:

- Aletodon conardae (Winterfeld, 1982)
- Aletodon gunnelli (Gingerich, 1977)
- Aletodon mellon (Van Valen, 1978)
- Aletodon quadravus (Gingerich, 1983)
