= Angel Peak Scenic Area =

Coordinates: 36.547°N 107.863°W

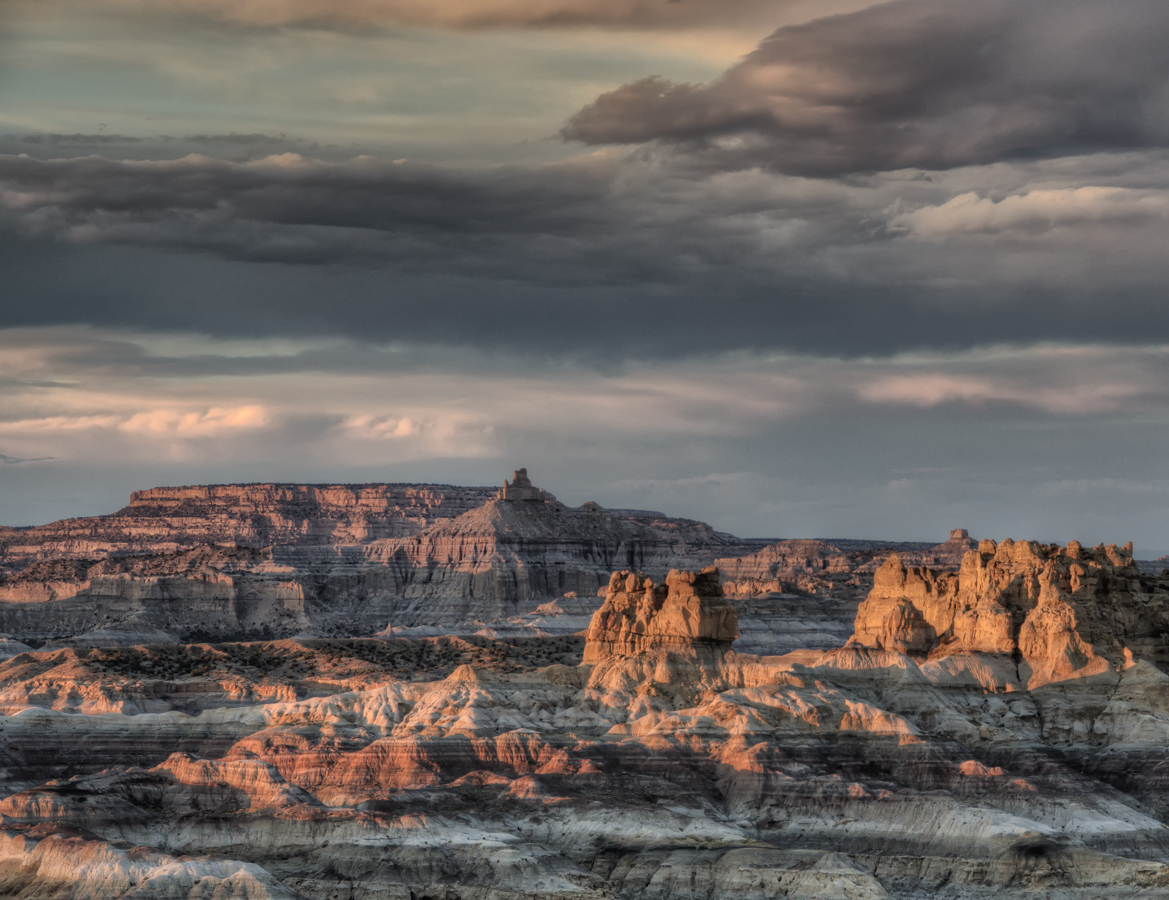
Badlands, Angel Peak Scenic Area

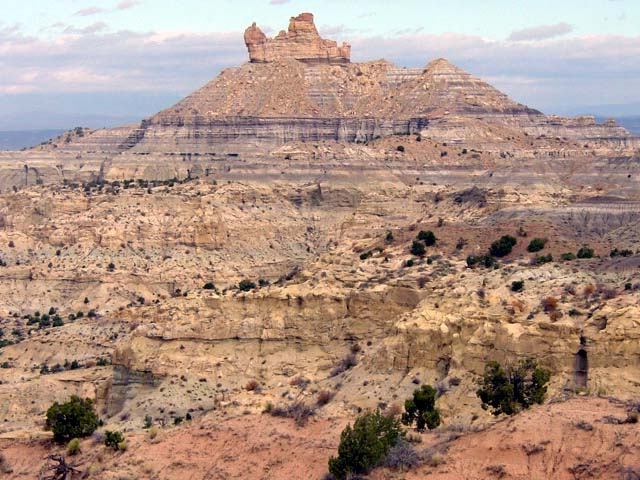
Angel Peak (elevation 6,988 feet) and badlands

The Angel Peak Scenic Area is a Bureau of Land Management (BLM) recreation area located about 15 miles south of Bloomfield in San Juan County, New Mexico. The recreation area, which encompasses more than 10,000 acres of rugged terrain, features Angel Peak (elevation 6,988 feet), colorful badlands and deep canyons.

== Geology ==
Angel Peak and the higher terrain are made up of the Eocene San Jose Formation (sandstone), and the badlands are made up of the underlying Paleocene Nacimiento Formation: shale, mudstone, and fine sandstone.

== Facilities ==
Three picnic areas and a campground are located along the canyon rim overlooking Angel Peak and the Kutz Canyon badlands. Angel Peak Campground has nine sites available for tent camping, and features a short nature trail.

Access to the area is via graded county road 7175, from US 550.

== See also ==
- Bisti/De-Na-Zin Wilderness
- Ah-Shi-Sle-Pah Wilderness Study Area
- San Juan Basin
