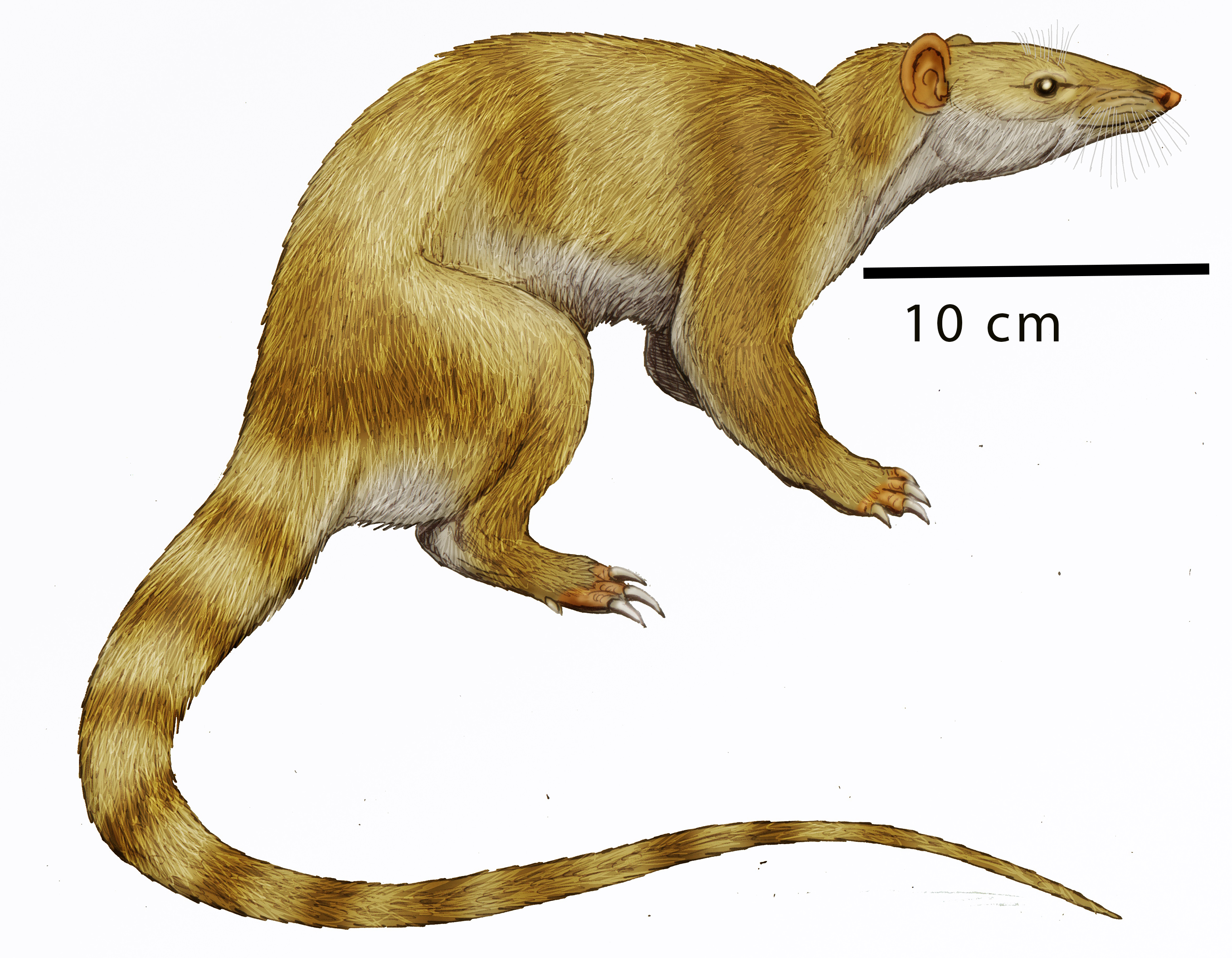
- Artist reconstruction of Escavadodon zygus

Scientific classification
- Kingdom: Animalia
- Phylum: Chordata
- Class: Mammalia
- Infraclass: Placentalia
- Order: †Palaeanodonta
- Family: †Escavadodontidae; Rose & Lucas, 2000
- Genus: †Escavadodon; Rose & Lucas, 2000

Type species
- †Escavadodon zygus Rose & Lucas, 2000

= Escavadodon =

Escavadodon Temporal range: 61.4–60.9 Ma middle Paleocene

Extinct family of mammals

Escavadodon ("tooth from Escavada") is an extinct genus of pangolin-like myrmecophagous placental mammals of extinct monotypic family Escavadodontidae within extinct order Palaeanodonta, that lived in North America during the middle Paleocene. It contains a single species, Escavadodon zygus, recovered from the Nacimiento Formation of New Mexico.

== See also ==
- Mammal classification
- Palaeanodonta
