= Listrognathosuchus =

Listrognathosuchus Temporal range: Middle Paleocene

Scientific classification
- Domain: Eukaryota
- Kingdom: Animalia
- Phylum: Chordata
- Class: Reptilia
- Clade: Archosauromorpha
- Clade: Archosauriformes
- Order: Crocodilia
- Superfamily: Alligatoroidea
- Genus: †Listrognathosuchus; Brochu, 1997

Species
- †L. multidentatus (Mook, 1930 [originally Leidyosuchus multidentatus]) (type)

Extinct genus of reptiles

Listrognathosuchus is an extinct genus of alligatoroid crocodilian. Fossils date back to the middle Paleocene epoch. In 1997, the generic name replaced that of Leidyosuchus for the species L. multidentatus (now the type species of Listrognathosuchus). "L." multidentalis was first described by Charles Mook in 1930 on the basis of the holotype AMNH 5179, consisting of a partial vertebral column, mandible, partial left ilium, and left tibia, found from a locality in Torrejon Arroyo, New Mexico (then referred to as the Torrejon beds, and now thought to be part of the Nacimiento Formation).

== Phylogenetics ==
The fragmentary nature of the material referable to Listrognathosuchus have made it hard to classify within Crocodylia, but it is now thought to be a relatively basal alligatoroid. Listrognathosuchus is closely related to Borealosuchus, a more basal eusuchian that is not an alligatoroid, but rather a close relative of a monophyletic group of which the superfamilies Alligatoroidea and Crocodyloidea comprise. In fact, Borealosuchus was first used as a replacement name for four species of Leidyosuchus, the same genus that Listrognathosuchus multidentatus once belonged to. Prior to the reassessment of Leidyosuchus in 1997, many relationships for the genus within Crocodilia have been considered. It was suggested to be a possible member of Diplocynodontinae or a relative of later crocodylids, and even as a member of its own subfamily of broad snouted early eusuchians, Leidysuchinae. However, with the naming of Listrognathosuchus and Borealosuchus, most species previously assigned to Leidyosuchus are now believed to have had little relation to any of the mentioned crocodilians.
