= Chacomylus =

Chacomylus Temporal range: Early Paleocene

Scientific classification
- Kingdom: Animalia
- Phylum: Chordata
- Class: Mammalia
- Family: †Hyopsodontidae
- Genus: †Chacomylus; Williamson & Weil, 2011

Species
- C. sladei Williamson & Weil, 2011 (type)

Extinct genus of mammals

Chacomylus is an extinct genus of odd-toed ungulate condylarth which existed in the Nacimiento Formation, United States during the early Paleocene period (Puercan age). It was first named by Thomas E. Williamson and Anne Weil in 2011 and the type species is Chacomylus sladei.
