= List of fossiliferous stratigraphic units in Portugal =

Group or Formation	Period	Notes
Abadia Formation	Jurassic	
Abadia Beds Formation	Jurassic	
Alacer do Sal Formation	Neogene	
Alcobaça Formation	Jurassic	
Amaral Formation	Jurassic	
Argilas de Aveiro Formation	Cretaceous	
Assises à Orbitolines Formation	Cretaceous	
Azóia Formation	Jurassic	
Bombarral Formation	Jurassic	
Brachyanticlinal of Caneças Formation	Cretaceous	
Brejo Fundeiro Formation	Ordovician	
Brenha Formation	Jurassic	
Cabaços Formation	Jurassic	
Cabeca Formation	Jurassic	
Cabeco do Peao Formation	Ordovician	
Cabril Formation	Ordovician	
Cacela Formation	Neogene	
Cacemes Group/Cacemes Formation	Ordovician	
Calcaires et marnes à Choffatelles Formation	Cretaceous	
Calcaires et silts de Ladeiras Formation	Cretaceous	
Calcaires récifaux Formation	Cretaceous	
calcaires récifaux inférieurs Formation	Cretaceous	
Calcaires récifaux supérieurs Formation	Cretaceous	
calcaires à Choffatelles et Dasycladacées Formation	Cretaceous	
Calcaires à Polypiers de Lagosteiros Formation	Cretaceous	
Calcaires à Rudistes de Boca do Chapim Formation	Cretaceous	
Calcaires à Rudistes de Praia dos Coxos Formation	Cretaceous	
Camadas de Almargem Formation	Cretaceous	
Carregueira Formation	Ordovician	
Esbarrondadoiro Formation	Neogene	
Farta Pao Formation	Jurassic	
Feligueira Grande Formation	Paleogene	
Figueira da Foz Formation	Cretaceous	
Fonte da Horta Formation	Ordovician	
Freixial Formation	Jurassic	
Gres de Bucaco Formation	Permian	
Grès de Rochadouro Formation	Cretaceous	
Grès de Silves Formation	Triassic	
Grès et argiles supérieurs Formation	Cretaceous	
Grès inférieur et assises à Orbitolines Formation	Cretaceous	
Grès inférieurs Formation	Cretaceous	
Grès à Dinosauriens Formation	Cretaceous	
Grès à Trigonies Formation	Cretaceous	
Grès, argiles et lignites inférieurs Formation	Cretaceous	
Grès, argiles et lignites supérieurs Formation	Cretaceous	
Lagos Portimao Formation	Neogene	
Lagos Formation	Neogene	
Les calcaires à choffatelles et dasycladacées Formation	Cretaceous	
Littoral of Alentejo Formation	Neogene	
Llandeilan Formation	Ordovician	
Lourinhã Formation	Jurassic	
Lower Bone Bed Formation	Neogene	
Marnes et grès de Santa Susana Formation	Cretaceous	
Marnes à Huîtres Formation	Cretaceous	
Marnes à Toxaster Formation	Cretaceous	
Marno Formation	Cretaceous	
Montejunto Formation	Jurassic	
Olhos Amarelos e Pousio da Galeota Formation	Cretaceous	
Olhos de Agua sands Formation	Neogene	
Ota Limestone Formation	Jurassic	
Papo Seco Formation	Cretaceous	
Peral Formation	Jurassic	
Pteroceriano Formation	Jurassic	
Rio Ceira Group/Ribeira do Bracal Formation	Ordovician	
Sanguineira Group/Louredo Formation	Ordovician	
Sanguinheira Group/Favacal Bed Formation	Ordovician	
Sao Romao Formation	Jurassic	
Serra de Aire Formation	Jurassic	
Silveirinha Formation	Paleogene	
Sobral Unit	Jurassic	
São Gião Formation	Jurassic	
Touril Complex Formation	Neogene	
Valongo Formation	Ordovician	
Venda Nova Group/Ferradosa Formation	Ordovician	
Venda Nova Group/Porto de Santa Anna Formation	Ordovician	
Xistensa Formation	Ordovician	
Xistos com Nodulos Formation	Silurian	
Água de Madeiros Formation	Jurassic	

== See also ==
- Lists of fossiliferous stratigraphic units in Europe
