= Torrejonian =

North American faunal stage

The Torrejonian North American Stage, on the geologic timescale, is a North American faunal stage within the North American Land Mammal Ages chronology (NALMA). It occupies part of the Paleocene epoch, covering an estimated age of about 65.1 to 62.3 million years ago. It is roughly equivalent to the later part of the Danian global stage (Early Paleocene).

The Torrejonian is preceded by the Puercan and followed by the Tiffanian NALMA stages. The Torrejonian-Tiffanian boundary is often correlated with the Danian-Selandian boundary (on the global timescale), the Shanghuan-Nongshanian boundary (in Asian land mammal ages), and the C27n-C26r polarity chron boundary (on the geomagnetic polarity time scale).

== Mammal fauna ==
The Torrejonian marks the first appearance of many mammal groups in North America, including:

- Apatemyidae (aye-aye-like arboreal mammals with no close living relatives)
- Pantolestidae (otter-like carnivores with no close living relatives)
- Pantodonta (stocky omnivores and herbivores with no close living relatives)
- Deltatherium (an enigmatic omnivore, possibly related to pantodonts or tillodonts)
- Nyctitheriidae (relatives of shrews, moles, and hedgehogs)
- Plesiadapidae, Palaechthonidae, Paromomyidae, and Carpolestidae ("plesiadapiform" relatives of primates)
- Picrodontidae, Mixodectidae, and Plagiomenidae (possible relatives of primates and/or colugos)
- Palaeanodonta (early relatives of pangolins)
- Viverravidae (early relatives of carnivorans)
- Phenacodontidae (early hoofed omnivores and herbivores)
- Mesonychidae (hoofed carnivores)

== Substages ==
The Torrejonian contains the following three substages, from oldest to youngest:

- Torrejonian 1 (To1): The oldest substage, starting at the first appearance of Periptychus carinidens (a periptychid) and ending at the first appearance of Protoselene opisthacus (a mioclaenid). Also known as the Dragonian, in reference to the Dragon local fauna in the North Horn Formation of Utah.
- Torrejonian 2 (To2): Starting at the first appearance of Protoselene opisthacus and ending at the first appearance of Mixodectes pungens (a mixodectid). Also known as the Deltatherium zone in New Mexico.
- Torrejonian 3 (To3) The youngest substage, starting at the first appearance of Mixodectes pungens and ending at the first appearance of Plesiadapis praecursor (a plesiadapid), which defines the start of the Tiffanian. Also known as the Pantolambda zone in New Mexico.

== Age ==
The oldest To1 fossils in New Mexico correlate to chron C28n. Farrand Channel and Horsethief Canyon, a pair of To1 sites in Montana, seem to be correlated to chron C28r, which would make them older than any other Torrejonian site. A 2009 study assigned a radiometric date of around 64.5 – 64.3 Ma to these sites, while a 2014 study published an even earlier estimate of around 65.12 – 65.04 Ma. Periptychus is unknown from these sites, and their estimated Torrejonian age is based on the presence of the paromomyid Paromomys instead. The oldest To1 fossils in Utah (the Dragon local fauna) are younger, correlated to the C28n-C27r boundary.

To2 sites appear to belong within chron C27r. In New Mexico, the To2-To3 boundary can be precisely dated to between 62.59 and 62.47 Ma, close to the boundary between C27r and C27n polarity chrons.

To3 is widely regarded as equivalent to C27n. Since Plesiadapis fossils have never been found in New Mexico, the end of To3 is impossible to precisely constrain in that area. A 2006 study offered an age of about 61.6 Ma for the end of the Torrejonian, based on a 2004 estimate for the end of C27n. As of 2020, the end of C27n has been recalibrated to 62.278 Ma, slightly older than the Danian-Selandian boundary.

== Formations ==
The Torrejonian is named after the "Torrejon Formation", a defunct geological unit in the San Juan Basin of New Mexico. It is roughly equivalent to the Ojo Encino Member of the Nacimiento Formation, the current name in use for Paleocene strata of the San Juan Basin. Geological formations preserving Torrejonian fossils include:

- Alberta:
  - Coalspur Formation (Diss)
  - Paskapoo Formation? (Who Nose?)
  - Porcupine Hills Formation
- Montana:
  - Fort Union Formation (including Lebo Member, Tullock Member)
- New Mexico:
  - Nacimiento Formation (Ojo Encino Member)
- North Dakota:
  - Ludlow Formation (Brown Ranch)
- Texas:
  - Black Peaks Formation
- Utah:
  - North Horn Formation (Sage Flat, Dragon local fauna)
- Wyoming:
  - Fort Union Formation (including Polecat Bench Formation)
  - Hanna Formation
