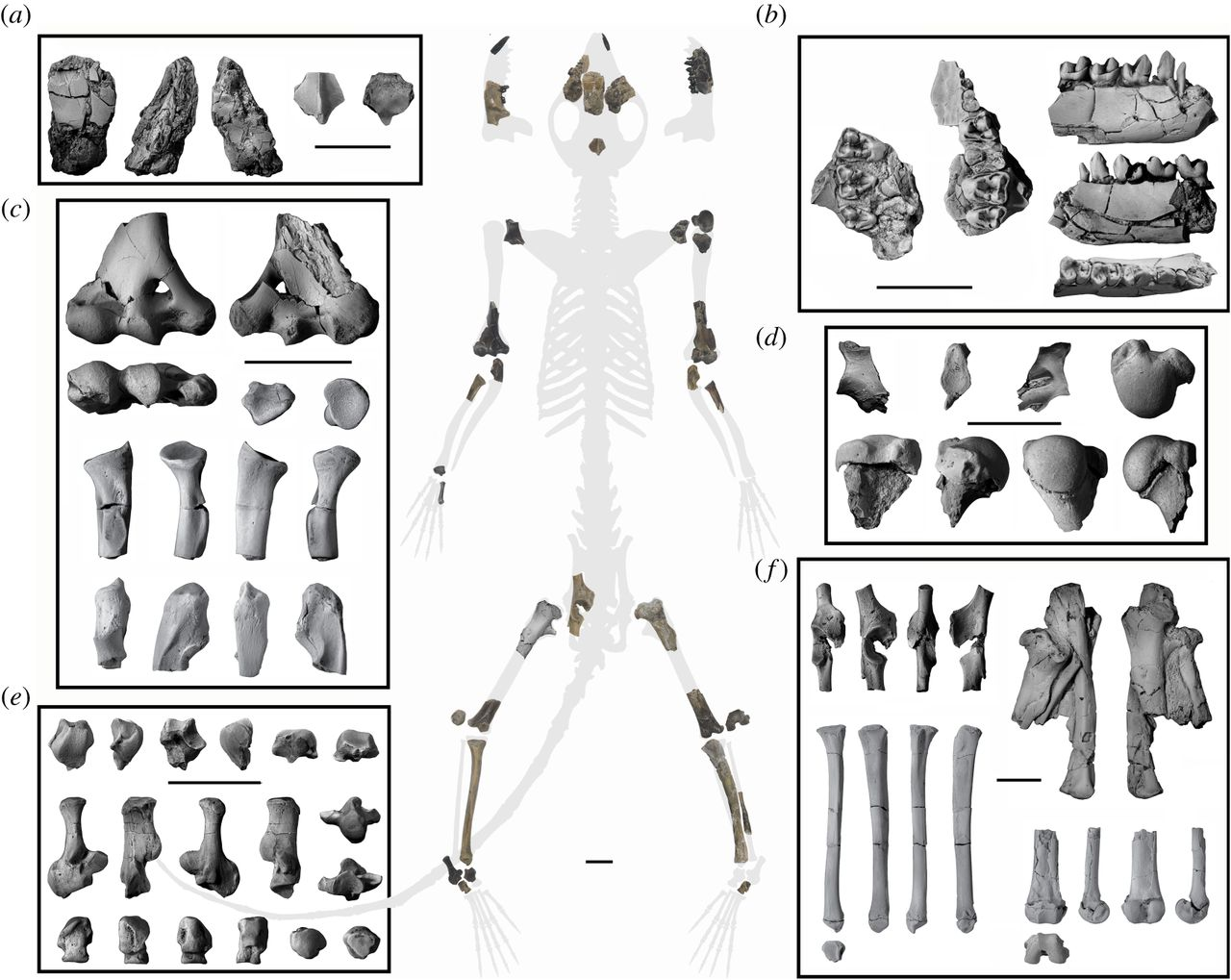
- Skeleton of Torrejonia wilsoni as viewed from below, with insets showing skull and limb bones in multiple views.

Scientific classification
- Kingdom: Animalia
- Phylum: Chordata
- Class: Mammalia
- Order: †Plesiadapiformes
- Family: †Palaechthonidae; Gunnell, 1989

Genera
- See text.

= Palaechthonidae =

Palaechthonidae Temporal range: Paleocene (Torrejonian - Tiffanian)

Extinct family of mammals

Palaechthonidae is an extinct family of plesiadapiforms (early primates or close relatives) from the Paleocene of North America. They were among the earliest plesiadapiforms in the fossil record, and they may be a paraphyletic group ancestral to a longer-lasting plesiadapiform family, the Paromomyidae. For much of the 20th century, genera now grouped as palaechthonids were classified as paromomyids.

Most palaechthonid species are only known from isolated tooth-bearing fragments, but there are more complete exceptions. Plesiolestes nacimienti preserves the oldest known braincase of any euarchontan. Torrejonia wilsoni preserves both skull and postcranial fossils described in 2017, helping to infer the anatomy of the family as a whole. These new fossils reveal that Torrejonia was adapted for arboreal (tree-living) habits, with flexible limbs and strong grasping hands, like most other plesiadapiforms and primates.

Palaechthonids are mostly united by their lack of specializations. The orbits (eye sockets) are small and face to the sides, and the snout probably supported sensitive whiskers, as indicated by its large infraorbital foramen. Smaller members of the family (such as Plesiolestes) have tall, pointed tooth crowns which indicate an insectivorous diet. Some older studies inferred that Plesiolestes was a fully terrestrial insectivore akin to a hedgehog, though this was before the skeleton was directly known for any member of the family. Larger palaechthonids such as Torrejonia most certainly had a primate-like lifestyle, and their tooth shape supports a higher proportion of fruit in their diet.

== List of genera ==
- Subfamily Palaechthoninae Gunnell, 1989
  - Palaechthon Gidley, 1923
  - Palenochtha Simpson, 1935
  - Premnoides Gunnell, 1989
- Subfamily Plesiolestinae Gunnell, 1989
  - Anasazia Van Valen, 1994
  - Phoxomylus Fox, 2011
  - Plesiolestes Jepsen, 1930
  - Talpohenach Kay & Cartmill, 1977
  - Torrejonia Gazin, 1968
