= Morlodon =

Morlodon Temporal range: 55.2–47.8 Ma Early Eocene

Scientific classification
- Kingdom: Animalia
- Phylum: Chordata
- Class: Mammalia
- Order: †Hyaenodonta
- Superfamily: †Hyaenodontoidea
- Clade: †Proviverrinae
- Genus: †Morlodon; Solé, 2013

Type species
- †Morlodon vellerei Solé, 2013

Extinct genus of mammals

Morlodon ("Morlo's tooth") is an extinct genus of proviverrine hyaenodonts found in what is now France during the early Eocene. It is a monotypic genus that contains a single species, M. vellerei.
