= Planetetherium =

Planetetherium Temporal range: 56.8–55.4 Ma

Scientific classification
- Kingdom: Animalia
- Phylum: Chordata
- Class: Mammalia
- Order: Dermoptera (?)
- Family: †Plagiomenidae
- Genus: †Planetetherium; Simpson, 1928
- Species: †P. mirabile

Binomial name
- †Planetetherium mirabile Simpson, 1928

Extinct genus of mammals

Planetetherium is an extinct genus of herbivorous plagiomenid mammal endemic to North America during the Paleogene living from 56.8 to 55.4 mya, existing for approximately 1.4 million years.

Fossils have been discovered in strata formed from ancient cypress forests, suggesting that this was the animal's preferred habitat.

== Morphology ==
Plantetherium is estimated to reach around 25 centimetres (10 in) in length, and its known materials closely resembled that of its modern relatives. Its teeth already included the comb-like structure distinctive to modern colugos. Since no postcranial materials have been described for any plagiomenid, there is no direct evidence that Planetetherium had the membrane of skin that allows modern colugos to glide.
