= Minimovellentodon =

Minimovellentodon Temporal range: 55.2–50.8 Ma Early Eocene

Scientific classification
- Kingdom: Animalia
- Phylum: Chordata
- Class: Mammalia
- Order: †Hyaenodonta
- Superfamily: †Hyaenodontoidea
- Clade: †Proviverrinae
- Genus: †Minimovellentodon; Solé et al., 2014

Type species
- †Minimovellentodon russelli Solé et al., 2014

Minimovellentodon ("small scraping tooth") is an extinct genus of proviverrine hyaenodonts that lived in France during the early Eocene. It is a monotypic genus that contains the species M. russelli.
