= Arcius =

Arcius Temporal range: Eocene
- Fossilised lower jaw of A. rougieri in the National Museum of Natural History, France

Scientific classification
- Kingdom: Animalia
- Phylum: Chordata
- Class: Mammalia
- Order: †Plesiadapiformes
- Family: †Paromomyidae
- Genus: †Arcius; Godinot, 1984

Type species
- †Arcius rougieri Godinot, 1984

Other species
- A. fuscus (Russell et al., 1967); A. lapparenti (Russell et al., 1967); A. zbyszewskii Estravís, 2000; A. hookeri López-Torres & Silcox, 2018; A. ilerdensis López-Torres & Silcox, 2018; A. moniquae Godinot et al., 2021

Extinct genus of paromomyid

Arcius (named after the Arc Valley in France) is an extinct genus of plesiadapiform mammal that lived in Europe during the early Eocene. Seven named species have been assigned to it since the genus was established in 1984, and their fossils have been found in France, Portugal, Spain and the UK. Most of these fossils are isolated teeth, though jaw bones of this animal have also been found. Members of this genus varied greatly in size, with the largest species estimated to have a body mass of 156 to 327 g (5.5 to 11.5 oz), whereas the smallest would only have weighed 60 to 130 g (2.1 to 4.6 oz).

== Discovery and naming ==
The genus Arcius was established in 1984 by French primate researcher Marc Godinot, who studied several fossilised specimens of the animal's jaws and teeth found in the Palette deposit of Bouches-du-Rhône, France. Godinot selected the generic name in reference to the Arc Valley, where the Palette deposit is located. Recognising that the fossils represent a species that was unknown to science, he named this species Arcius rougieri after M. Rougier (who helped excavate the fossils) and designated it as the type species of the genus. Additionally, Godinot also analysed the fossils of two species which were assigned to the genus Phenacolemur at the time. These two species, named Phenacolemur fuscus and Phenacolemur lapparenti, were described in 1967 by a team consisting of paleontologists Donald Russell, Pierre Louis and Donald Savage based on fossils from the French communes of Mutigny and Avenay. While this team believed these two species were similar enough to North American species of Phenacolemur to warrant being placed in that genus, Godinot instead believed they were more similar to Arcius rougieri. Therefore, he moved them to the genus Arcius such that their names became Arcius fuscus and Arcius lapparenti respectively.

Though Godinot erected Arcius to include only three species, other authors would later assign more to the genus. In 2000, Portuguese paleontologist Carmen Estravís established a species named Arcius zbyszewskii based on fossilised teeth found in the Silveirinha Formation of Baixo Mondego, Portugal. The specific name is derived from the surname of Portuguese geologist Georges Zbyszewski, honoring his extensive work on the geology and paleontology of the country. Two more species were erected in a 2018 publication written by paleontologists Sergi López-Torres and Mary T. Silcox; one was named Arcius hookeri while the other was named Arcius ilerdensis. A single right lower jaw extracted from the Blackheath Beds of Abbey Wood near London, UK represents the only known material of A. hookeri, and is kept in the Natural History Museum of London under the specimen number BMNH.M 44945. The species is named after Jeremy J. Hooker, a researcher at said museum. Meanwhile, A. ilerdensis is known from four teeth found in Masia de l'Hereuet, a site in the Spanish city of Lleida, and its specific name is derived from the ancient name of the city. In 2021, an additional species named Arcius moniquae was described based on fossilised teeth from the Cos fissure filling of the Quercy Phosphorites Formation in France. This species is named after Monique Vianey-Liaud, a researcher who has studied rodent fossils from this area.

== Description ==
Speculative life restoration of Arcius

The vast majority of known Arcius fossils are isolated teeth, with only the species A. rougieri and A. hookeri known from non-dental remains, all of which are jaw elements. As indicated by the most complete jaw specimens of A. rougieri, the dental formula of this species is 2.1.2.31.0.1.3; that is, each half of the upper jaw bears two incisors, one canine, two premolars and three molars, while each half of the lower jaw has one incisor, no canines, one premolar and three molars. Other species of Arcius presumably have the same dental formula, but their known remains are not complete enough to verify this. The body mass of each Arcius species has been estimated using various regression equations, suggesting that A. lapparenti is the largest member of the genus; its mass is believed to be 156 to 327 g (5.5 to 11.5 oz), with the exact value varying depending on the equation used. The smallest species is A. zbyszewskii, which weighed only 60 to 130 g (2.1 to 4.6 oz).
