= Paschatherium =

Paschatherium Temporal range: Paleocene to Eocene

Scientific classification
- Kingdom: Animalia
- Phylum: Chordata
- Class: Mammalia
- Family: †Hyopsodontidae
- Genus: †Paschatherium; Russel, 1963

Type species
- †Paschatherium russelli

Species
- P. marianae; P. plaziati; P. russelli

Paschatherium is a small extinct mammal of the Perissodactyla order, with an insectivore-like dentition. Its morphology indicates an arboreal form, adapted climbing and running on trees. Paschatherium must have been extremely numerous in the latest Paleocene and earliest Eocene of Europe, since it makes up the majority of all mammal fossils in some fossil sites.

Paschatherium has been viewed as a possible ancestor of our modern elephants, sea cows and hyraxes. However, a 2014 cladistic analysis places it within stem perissodactyls.
