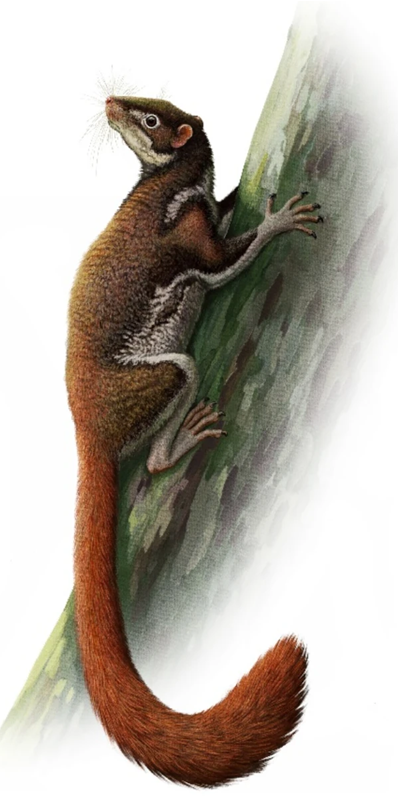
- Life restoration of Mixodectes pungens

Scientific classification
- Kingdom: Animalia
- Phylum: Chordata
- Class: Mammalia
- Family: †Mixodectidae
- Genus: †Mixodectes; Cope, 1883

Species
- Mixodectes pungens Cope, 1883; Mixodectes malaris Cope, 1884

= Mixodectes =

Mixodectes Temporal range: Paleocene

Extinct primatomorph genus

Mixodectes is an extinct genus of mixodectid mammal that lived in North America during the Paleocene epoch.

== Palaeobiology ==
M. pungens lived an arboreal lifestyle, and its teeth suggest that it was an omnivore whose diet included leaves despite lacking the specialist adaptations for folivory seen in colugos.
