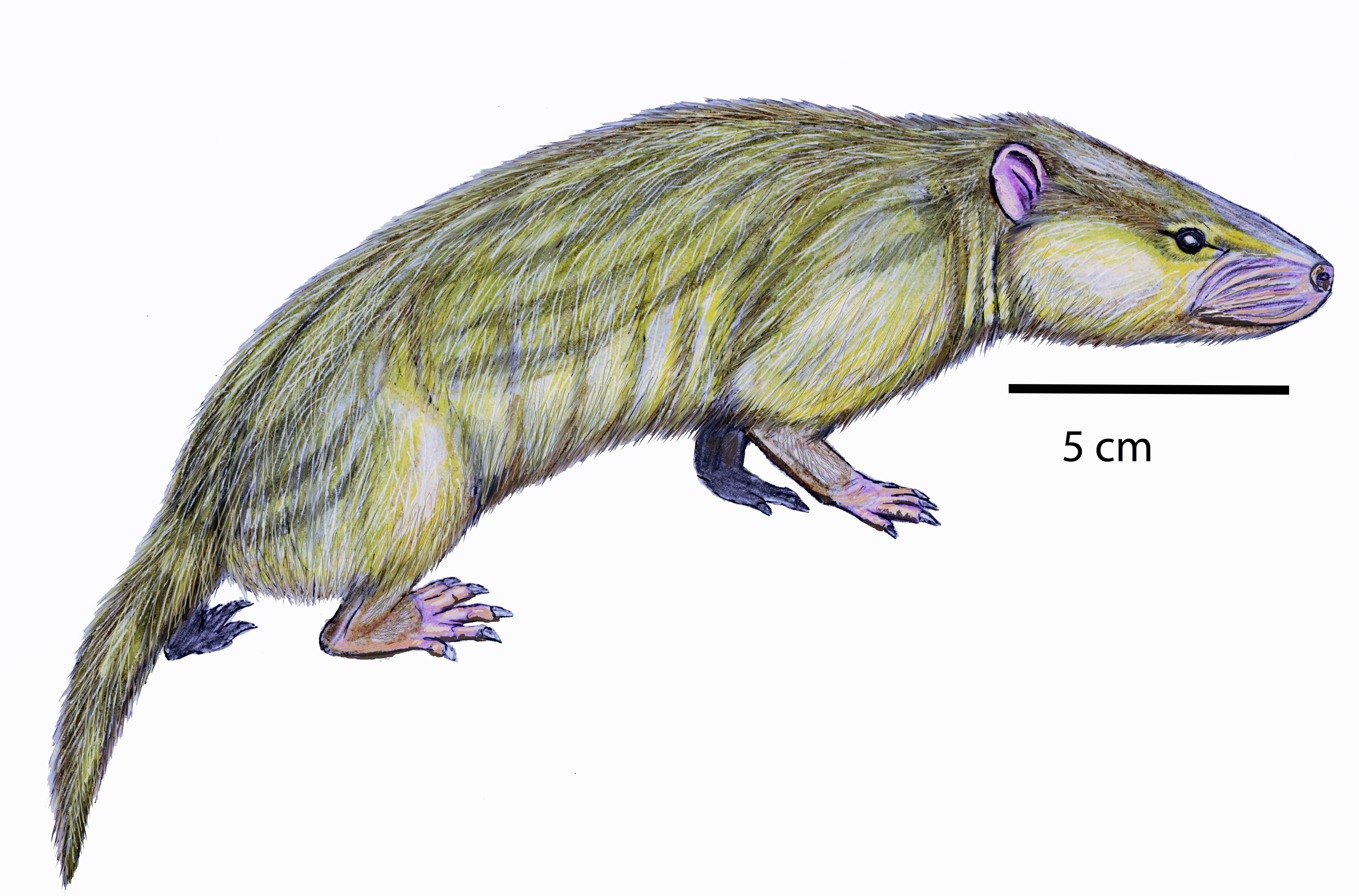
- Life restoration of Hyopsodus sp.

Scientific classification
- Kingdom: Animalia
- Phylum: Chordata
- Class: Mammalia
- Clade: Panperissodactyla
- Family: †Hyopsodontidae; Trouessart, 1879

Subgroups
- See text

Synonyms
- Mioclaenidae? Osborn and Earle, 1895

= Hyopsodontidae =

Hyopsodontidae Temporal range: Early Paleocene to Eocene (Puercan - early Chadronian)

Extinct family of mammals

Hyopsodontidae is an extinct family of primitive mammals, initially assigned to the order Condylarthra, living from the Paleocene to the Eocene in North America and Eurasia. They were generally small omnivores, like many early mammals. The most common genus is Hyopsodus.

Condylarthra is now thought to be a wastebasket taxon, and Hyopsodontidae (in its broadest form) may be as well. Some hyopsodontids have occasionally been speculated to be related to Afrotheria, while the most recent consensus is that Hyopsodus at least is related to Perissodactyla: analysis of the inner ear shows shared characteristics with the Equoidea (horses and paleotheres); Hyopsodus may belong to a basal ungulate group near to perissodactyls.

Members of the family were small by modern standards, ranging in size from a small rat to a raccoon. The hyopsodontids had many primitive mammal characteristics, including five-toed feet with claws and a complete dentition: a full set of incisors, canines, premolars, and molars. During the Paleocene in Europe, louisinines (sometimes considered to belong within hyopsodontids) reached a high diversity level, starting with Louisina and Monshyus in Hainin, Belgium, and following in the Cernaysian beds with Tricuspiodon, Paratricuspiodon, and Paschatherium. High levels of diversity are also seen in Western North America in the Eocene within the genus Hyopsodus, with up to 18 named species, some of which are specific to particular locations over short spans of geologic time. This pattern suggests that at least some hyosodontids became quite specialized for specific ways of life. The group was not especially long-lived, but highly successful for its time, with fossil material in some areas suggesting large numbers of individuals.

== Subgroups ==
=== Hyopsodus and Mioclaenidae ===
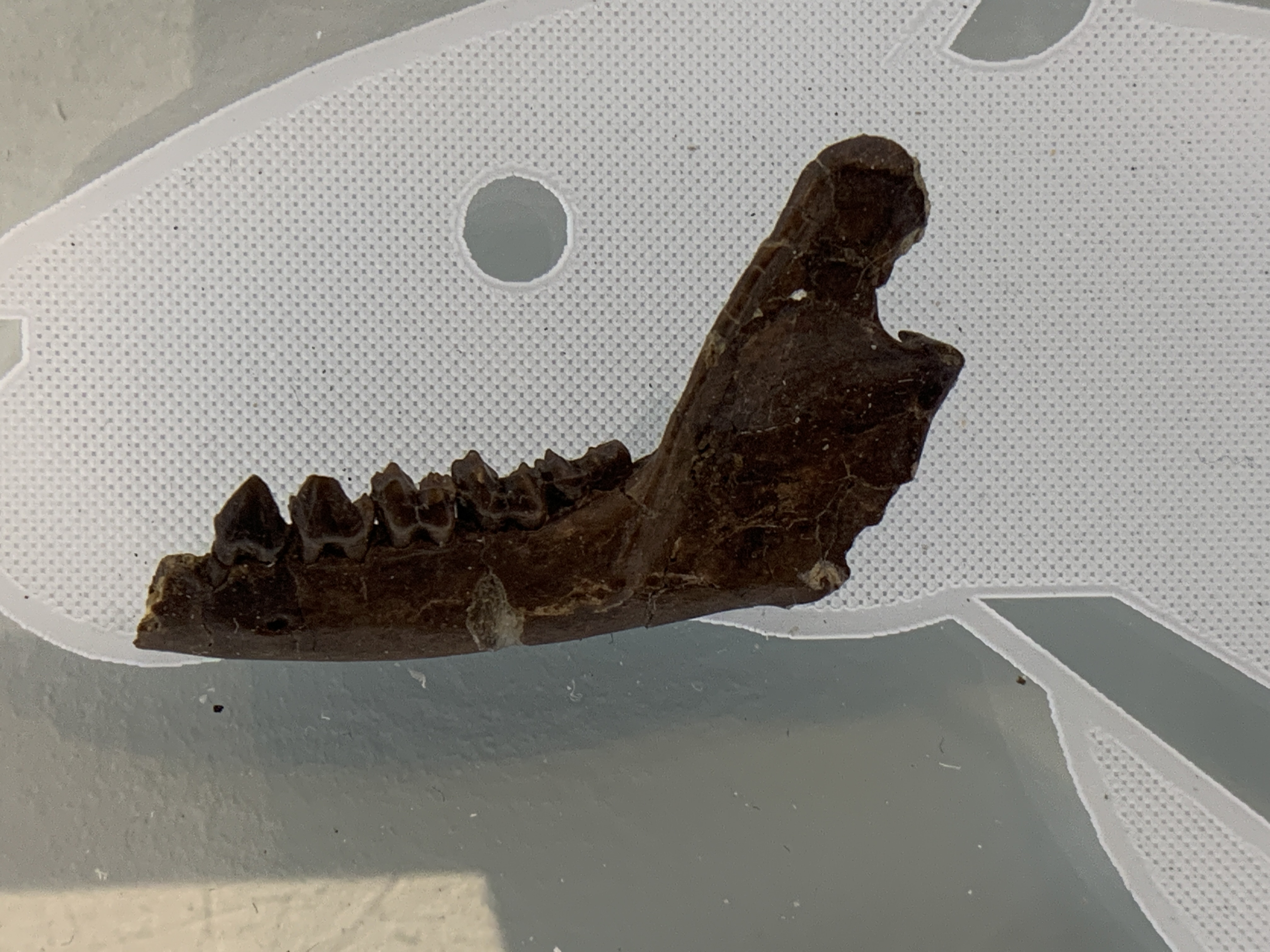
The lower jaw of Promioclaenus thnetus, a mioclaenid from the Porcupine Hills Formation (Early Palaeocene Alberta)

Hyopsodus, the namesake of Hyopsodontidae, is the most well-understood member of the family, with extensive fossils of the entire body. In many ways, it is also the most aberrant. It was a small Eocene omnivore with a weasel-like build, combining a long body with short legs and sensitive smell and hearing.

It is unclear whether Hyopsodus has any close relation to most other "hyopsodontids". Some studies prefer to use the family Mioclaenidae when referring to non-Hyopsodus members of the group, most of which lived in the Paleocene. Other studies refer to the entire group as hyopsodontids. Before the discovery of an Orthaspidotherium skull, the Pleuraspidotheriidae were included as Mioclaenids.

- Asiohyopsodus Tong and Wang, 2006
- Bomburodon Williamson and Carr, 2012 (formerly Bomburia Van Valen, 1978)
- Bubogonia Johnston and Fox, 1984
- Chacomylus Williamson and Weil, 2011
- Choeroclaenus Simpson, 1937
- Ellipsodon Scott, 1892
- Hyopsodus Leidy, 1870
- Lessnessina? Hooker, 1979 (possibly a paenungulate instead)
- Litaletes Simpson, 1935
- Mioclaenus Cope, 1881
- Promioclaenus Trouessart, 1904
- Protoselene Matthew, 1897
- Obtususdon? Xu, 1977
- Tiznatzinia Simpson, 1936
- Valenia de Muizon and Ciffeli, 2000

=== Apheliscidae ===
Apheliscidae is a group of small "condylarths", sometimes classified as a subgroup of hyopsodontids (generally to the exclusion of mioclaenids). Limb fossils indicate that Apheliscus and Haplomylus are adapted for fast and agile movement, unlike Hyopsodus. Many aspects of their teeth and limb bones suggest that apheliscids are closely related to Macroscelidea (the living elephant shrews or sengis, an entirely African order in the present day). Some studies regard these similarities as mere convergence. While most apheliscids are North American, Louisininae is an exclusively European group. A few studies raise it to a family (Louisinidae) separate from Apheliscidae, though still rather closely related.

- Aletodon Gingerich, 1977
- Dorraletes Gingerich, 1983
- Haplaletes Simpson, 1935
- Haplomylus Matthew, 1915
- Litomylus Simpson, 1935
- Utemylus Gingerich, 1983
- Apheliscinae Matthew, 1918
  - Apheliscus Cope, 1875
  - Gingerichia Zack et al., 2005
  - Phenacodaptes Jepsen, 1930
- Louisininae Sudre and Russell, 1982 (= Louisinidae)
  - Berrulestes Hooker and Russell, 2012
  - Cingulodon? De Bast and Smith, 2017
  - Dipavali Van Valen, 1978
  - Gigarton Hooker and Russell, 2012
  - Louisina Russell, 1964
  - Monshyus Sudre and Russell, 1982
  - Paschatherium Russell, 1964
  - Prolouisina Hooker and Russell, 2012
  - Teilhardimys Kretzoi and Kretzoi, 2000 (formerly Microhyus Teilhard de Chardin, 1927)
  - Thryptodon Hooker and Russell, 2012
  - Walbeckodon Hooker and Russell, 2012

=== Kollpaniinae ===
Kollpaniinae (or Kollpaniidae) is a group of small South American mammals often considered close to South American native ungulates (SANUs, a.k.a. Meridiungulata). Some studies have argued that kollpaniines originated from North American mioclaenids. In parsimony analyses by Püschel et al. (2024), the kollpaniines Molinodus and Tiuclaenus were found to be closely related to Mioclaenus turgidus, but this close relation was not recovered by the same study's Bayesian analyses.

There is still a distinct possibility that mioclaenids are ancestral to SANUs as a whole, since many studies have found similarities between Northern Hemisphere "condylarths" (such as mioclaenids and phenacodontids) and certain SANU groups (such as didolodontids and litopterns).

- Andinodus de Muizon and Marshall, 1987
- Escribania? Bonaparte et al., 1993 (potentially a didolodontid instead)
- Molinodus de Muizon and Marshall, 1987
- Pascualodus? Gelfo, 2004
- Pucanodus de Muizon and Marshall, 1991
- Simoclaenus de Muizon and Ciffeli, 2000
- Tiuclaenus de Muizon and Marshall, 1987

=== Tricuspiodontinae ===
- Paratricuspiodon
- Tricuspiodon
