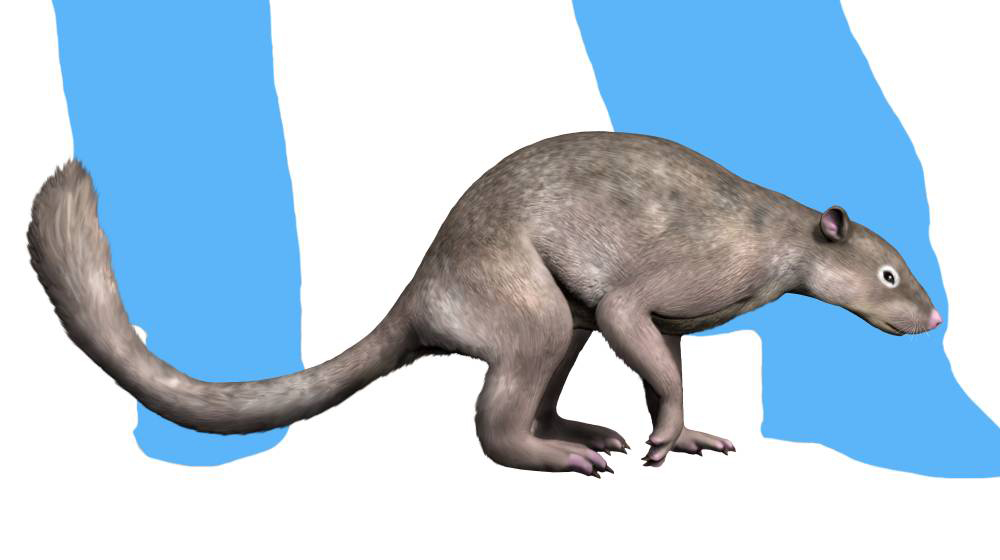
- Restoration of Ignacius graybullianus

Scientific classification
- Kingdom: Animalia
- Phylum: Chordata
- Class: Mammalia
- Order: †Plesiadapiformes
- Family: †Paromomyidae; Simpson, 1940

Genera
- Acidomomys Bloch et al., 2002; Arcius Godinot, 1984; Dianomomys Tong and Wang, 2006; Edworthia Fox et al., 2010; Elwynella Rose and Bown, 1982; Ignacius Robinson and Ivy, 1994; Paromomys Gidley, 1923; Phenacolemur Storer, 1990

= Paromomyidae =

Paromomyidae Temporal range: Paleocene - Eocene (Torrejonian - Chadronian)

Extinct family of mammals

Paromomyidae is an extinct family of "plesiadapiform" mammals (early primates or close relatives) which lived during the Paleocene and Eocene epochs (Torrejonian to Chadronian stages). They were the most widespread and long-lasting family of plesiadapiforms, ranging through North America as far south as New Mexico and as far north as the Canadian Arctic. One paromomyid, Arcius, inhabited parts of Europe, and undescribed fossils have also been found in China.

Complete paromomyid skeletons show that they were probably arboreal (tree-living). They would have moved in a similar manner as modern squirrels and treeshrews, relying on an agile bounding gait alongside strong hands and feet to grip trunks and branches. Compared to modern primates, they were probably most similar to marmosets and tamarins, sharing a rather small size (100–500 grams (0.22–1.10 lb)) and a diet of mainly tree sap, fruit, and insects. Unlike living primates, the snout is rather long and the small eyes are on the side of the head, rather than the front. This probably indicates a greater reliance on smell rather than vision when foraging.

Paromomyids may have preferred cooler temperatures than most primates; they were most common during cooler intervals such as the mid-Paleocene (Torrejonian) and briefly again in the early Eocene (mid-Wasatchian). On the other hand, they were very rare during hot intervals such as the Paleocene-Eocene Thermal Maximum (PETM) and the Early Eocene Climatic Optimum (EECO). The EECO may have pushed paromomyids to the brink of extinction, as their fossils continue to be very rare after the early Eocene.

Paromomyids are often considered close relatives to some members of the families Palaechthonidae and Picrodontidae. Together, they form a broader subgroup of Plesiadapiformes, known as Paromomyoidea. Most paromomyid genera appear to be paraphyletic. Historically, a few studies argued that paromomyids were gliding mammals within the order Dermoptera (modern colugos or "flying lemurs"). This argument was debunked when better-preserved skeletons revealed a complete lack of gliding adaptations.
