= Teilhardimys =

Teilhardimys Temporal range: Palaeocene–Eocene

Scientific classification
- Kingdom: Animalia
- Phylum: Chordata
- Class: Mammalia
- Order: Macroscelidea
- Family: †Louisinidae
- Genus: †Teilhardimys; Kretzoi and Kretzoi, 2000

Type species
- Teilhardimys musculus Kretzoi and Kretzoi, 2000

Other species
- Teilhardimys reisi Antunes et al., 1987; Teilhardimys brisswalteri Hooker and Russell, 2012

Extinct genus of louisinid mammal

Teilhardimys is an extinct genus of louisinid mammal that lived in Europe during the Palaeocene and Eocene epochs.

== Distribution ==
Teilhardimys reisi is only known from the Silveirinha clay pit, an Ypresian deposit in Portugal. The type species, Teilhardimys musculus, is known from the Palaeocene of France and Spain and the Eocene of France, Belgium, and the United Kingdom. Teilhardimys brisswalteri is known only from the Thanetian deposits of Cernay and Berru in France.

== Palaeobiology ==
=== Locomotion ===
Teilhardimys was a terrestrial mammal capable of fast running and jumping, as evidenced by aspects of its tarsal morphology such as the deeply grooved trochlea of its astragalus.
