= Dermotherium =

Dermotherium Temporal range: Late Eocene–Early Oligocene

Scientific classification
- Kingdom: Animalia
- Phylum: Chordata
- Class: Mammalia
- Order: Dermoptera
- Family: Cynocephalidae
- Genus: †Dermotherium; Ducrocq et al., 1992

Type species
- †Dermotherium major Ducrocq et al., 1992

Other species
- †D. chimaera Marivaux et al., 2006

Extinct genus of mammals related to the living colugos

Dermotherium is a genus of fossil mammals closely related to the living colugos, a small group of gliding mammals from Southeast Asia. Two species are recognized: D. major from the Late Eocene of Thailand, based on a single fragment of the lower jaw, and D. chimaera from the Late Oligocene of Thailand, known from three fragments of the lower jaw and two isolated upper molars. In addition, a single isolated upper molar from the Early Oligocene of Pakistan has been tentatively assigned to D. chimaera. All sites where fossils of Dermotherium have been found were probably forested environments and the fossil species were probably forest dwellers like living colugos, but whether they had the gliding adaptations of the living species is unknown.

Some features of the teeth differentiate Dermotherium from both living colugo species, but other features are shared with only one of the two. The third lower incisor, lower canine, and third lower premolar at least are pectinate or comblike, bearing longitudinal rows of tines or cusps, an unusual feature of colugos (the first two lower incisors are unknown in Dermotherium). The fourth lower premolar instead resembles the lower molars. The front part of these teeth, the trigonid, is broader in D. chimaera than in D. major, which is known only from the second and third lower molars. The two species also differ in the configuration of the inner back corner of the lower molars. The upper molars are triangular teeth bearing several distinct small cusps, particularly on the second upper molar, and with wrinkled enamel.

== Taxonomy ==
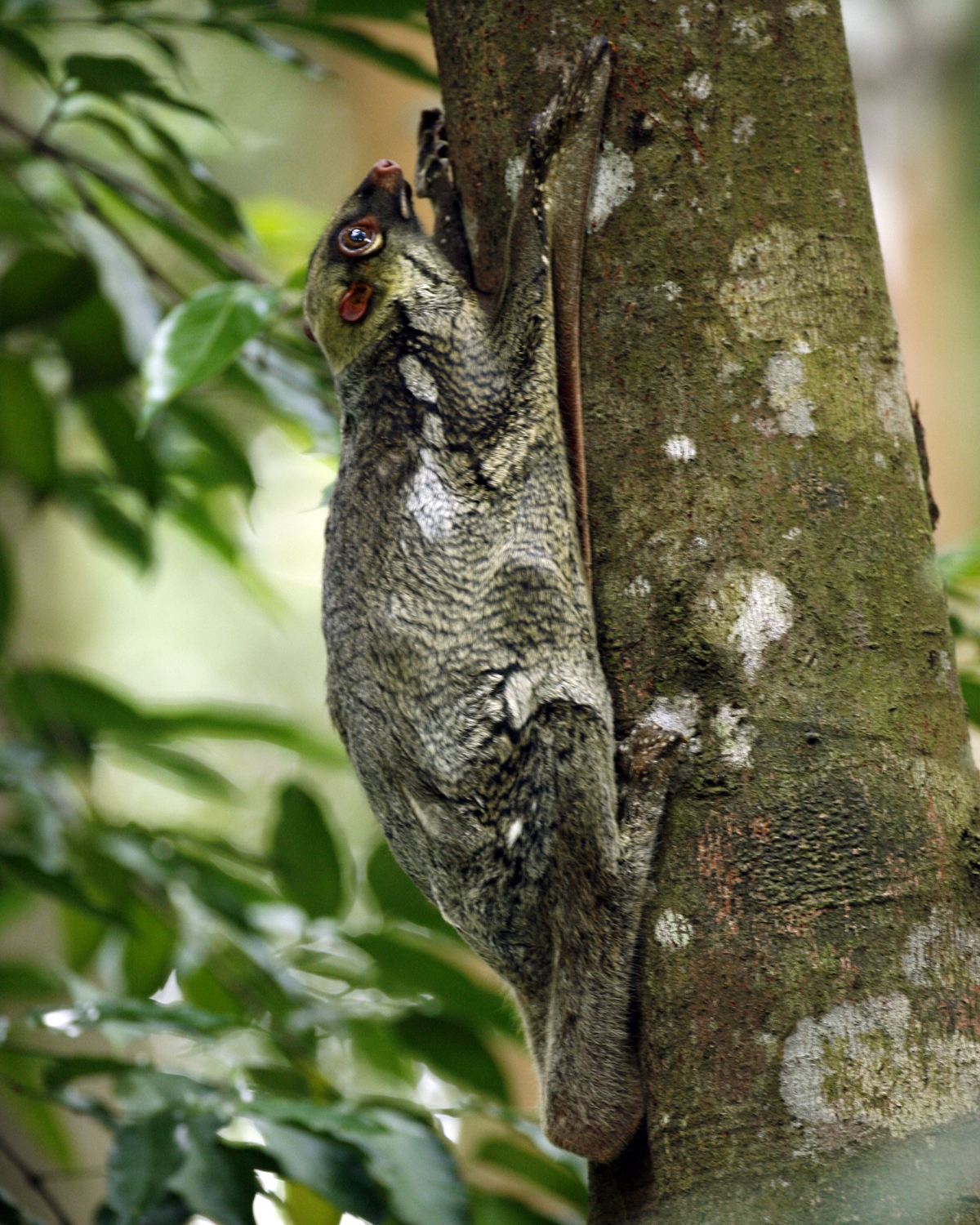
A Sunda colugo (Galeopterus variegatus), a living relative of Dermotherium

Colugos are a small group of Southeast Asian gliding mammals closely related to the primates. Their fossil record is exceptionally poor. Although Paleogene groups such as the Plagiomenidae are considered by some to be closely related to colugos, no fossils undoubtedly referable to the living colugo family, Cynocephalidae, had been reported until 1992. In that year, Stéphane Ducrocq and colleagues described a jaw fragment from the Eocene of Thailand as a new genus and species of colugo, Dermotherium major. In 2000, however, Brian Stafford and Frederick Szalay argued that Dermotherium might not be a colugo, since the fossil is so poorly preserved that few traits can be unambiguously recognized and some purported dermopteran features of the fossil are also seen in other placental groups. Mary Silcox and colleagues reaffirmed the colugo affinities of Dermotherium in 2005 on the basis of detailed similarities in molar morphology.

In 2006, Laurent Marivaux and colleagues described a second species of Dermotherium, D. chimaera, from material from the Oligocene of Thailand. They gave it the specific name chimaera (Latin for "chimera") because it shares characters with both the Philippine colugo (Cynocephalus volans) and Sunda colugo (Galeopterus variegatus), the two living colugo species. In addition, they tentatively identified a fossil from the Oligocene of Pakistan as Dermotherium chimaera and regarded some fossils from the Eocene of Myanmar as indeterminate dermopterans. According to a phylogenetic analysis carried out by Marivaux and colleagues, D. chimaera, D. major, and the Myanmar dermopteran are successive sister groups of the two living colugos.

== Description ==
Known material of Dermotherium includes a handful of jaw fragments and isolated teeth. Dermotherium major is known only from a fragment of the left lower jaw bearing the third lower molar (m3) and a poorly preserved second lower molar (m2). The holotype of Dermotherium chimaera is a lower jaw fragment in which remnants of the deciduous third lower premolar are visible. X-ray microtomography reveals the unerupted lower third incisor (i3), canine (c1), third premolar (p3), and fourth premolar (p4) still inside the jaw. In addition, this species is known from two other jaw fragments, one bearing m1 and m2 and the other bearing m2 and m3, and two isolated molars, an upper first and second molar (M1 and M2). The tentatively referred material of this species from Pakistan includes a single M2.

The two species of Dermotherium were about as large as the Philippine colugo and larger than the Sunda colugo and differed from both in several characteristics of the dentition. Not enough is known of the skeleton of Dermotherium to assess whether the animal already possessed the gliding adaptations of living colugos. The two species are similar in size, but again differ in details of the dentition. In two specimens of D. chimaera, the length and width of the m2 are 5 and 4.3 mm (0.20 and 0.17 in) and 5.4 and 4.8 mm (0.21 and 0.19 in) respectively; this tooth is 5.4 mm (0.21 in) long and 4.9 mm (0.19 in) wide in the only known specimen of Dermotherium major. The Pakistani M2 of Dermotherium is 4.3 mm (0.17 in) long and 6 mm (0.24 in) wide, compared to 4.7 and 6.6 mm (0.19 and 0.26 in) in the only known M2 of D. chimaera from Thailand.

The lower jaw of Dermotherium major resembles that of living colugos in the presence of a strong angular process (a projecting piece of bone at the lower side of the back of the jawbone) and a retromolar space (a flat space behind the last molars). The coronoid process (a projecting piece of bone directly behind the molars) rises steeply, with its front wall virtually vertical.

=== Lower dentition ===
The i3 of Dermotherium chimaera is an elongate tooth bearing six tines (narrow, high "fingers" as in a comb) arranged from front to back. The frontmost is larger, the next four are about equal in size, and the sixth is smaller. The number of tines resembles that seen in the Sunda colugo, which has four to seven; the Philippine colugo has three to five. The c1 is also an elongate, narrow tooth; at the front, it is slightly curved towards the midline of the jaw. On the buccal (outer) side of this tooth are six cusps, of which the third (counting from the front) is the largest. The p3 is similarly elongate and rounded at the front, but it is broader at the back, forming a talonid (a "heel" of cusps at the back of a tribosphenic tooth). There are six cusps on the narrow anterior part of the tooth, and the fifth (identified as the protoconid) is by far the largest. On the buccal side of the talonid is a strong cusp, the hypoconid, with a crest, the cristid obliqua, descending from it towards the front. A second, smaller cusp, the hypoconulid, is present on the lingual side of the talonid, connected to the hypoconid by a postcristid. The pectinate (comb-like) shape of the anterior teeth is a shared characteristic of the colugos and highly unusual among mammals. Dermotherium chimaera resembles the Sunda colugo in that the c1 and p3 are also pectinate; in the Philippine colugo, these teeth are not pectinate.

In Dermotherium chimaera, the p4 and m1 through m3 are similar to each other (and unlike the i3, canine, and p3) and appear to form a series of decreasing size from front to back. In D. major, only m2 and m3 are known, but they are similar in morphology and m3 is smaller than m2. In the Sunda colugo, however, the teeth get larger from p4 to m3. The p4 and molars have a distinct trigonid (a triangular group of cusps at the front of a tribosphenic tooth) and talonid. The trigonid contains strong protoconid and metaconid cusps. The metaconid is stronger than the protoconid in the molars, but it is not clear whether this is the case in the p4. In the living colugos, the protoconid is higher than the metaconid in both p4 and m1. The trigonid is longer in the p4 than in the molars. In D. chimaera, the trigonid is broader than in D. major. A low crest, the paracristid, descends from the protoconid lingually and towards the front, forming the front margin of the trigonid; there is no distinct cusp (a paraconid) at the front of the trigonid on the p4, but this cusp is present in the molars.

The talonid contains a hypoconid, hypoconulid, and entoconid and is much wider than the trigonid because the hypoconid is displaced buccally. A cristid obliqua descends from the hypoconid and reaches the protoconid. Although a crest, the postmetacristid, descends from the back side of the metaconid, ending in a small cusp, the metastylid, it is separated from the entoconid by a notch. The living colugos lack such a strong postmetacristid. The hypoconulid is near the back lingual margin of the tooth, behind the entoconid. In D. major, this cusp is further to the back than in both D. chimaera and the Sunda colugo, while the two cusps are merged in the Philippine colugo. In D. chimaera, a low crest, the post-hypoconulid cristid, reaches from the hypoconulid to the back lingual corner of the tooth, where a small cuspule, the distocuspid, is located. A long crest, the postcristid, connects the distocuspid to the hypoconid along the posterior side of the tooth. The Philippine colugo is similar, but in D. major, both the distocuspid and the post-hypoconulid cristid are absent, and the Sunda colugo has a weaker distocuspid and a postcristid that does not reach further lingually than the hypoconulid.

=== Upper dentition ===
The upper molars of Dermotherium chimaera are triangular in overall shape and much broader than long, with the narrow end of the triangle pointing lingually. The M2 from Pakistan that was tentatively placed in D. chimaera is slightly smaller than Thai fossils of the species, but otherwise very similar. The crest in front of and behind the major cusps on the buccal side of the tooth, the paracone and metacone, are well-developed, together forming a long W-shaped ridge. D. chimaera resembles the Philippine colugo in that the crests behind the paracone and in front of the metacone form an acute angle with each other, so that together they form a V; their shape rather resembles a U in the Sunda colugo. A cingulum (shelf) is present on the buccal margin of the tooth, but this cingulum is rather weak in the Pakistani fossil. On the M2, smaller cusps, the paraconule and metaconule, are present on the lingual sides of the paracone and metacone, but on the M1 the paraconule is missing and the metaconule is small and ridgelike. The small cusps are better developed in the Pakistani M2. A third major cusp, the protocone, is present on the lingual side of both upper molars. This crest is displaced towards the front in the living colugos, but less so in D. chimaera. Two strong crests descend from the front and back faces of the protocone in a buccal direction. These crests end in small cusps (protoconules) that are directly lingual to the paracone and metacone. The living colugos lack these protoconules. The enamel is wrinkled on the flanks of the paracone and metacone and, in the Thai but not the Pakistani specimens, on the lingual side of the protocone. Enamel wrinkling is also seen in some Philippine colugos.

== Range and ecology ==
Dermotherium major was found in a lignite pit known as Wai Lek in Krabi Province, southwestern Thailand. It is part of the Krabi Basin fauna, which contains at least 40 mammalian genera, mostly artiodactyls but also including some primates, such as Siamopithecus, Wailekia, and Muangthanhinius. This fauna has been dated to about 33 to 35 million years ago, during the Late Eocene.

Fossils of Dermotherium chimaera come from Phetchaburi Province, further to the north in Thailand. The fossil deposits, located in the Cha Prong pit in a coal mine called Nong Ya Plong, are dated to the Late Oligocene. Other mammals found here include the rodent Fallomus ladakhensis, the rhinoceros Diceratherium sp. cf. D. lamilloquense, the carnivoran Chaprongictis phetchaburiensis, the lipotyphlan Siamosorex debonisi, and a pteropodid bat.

Paali Nala, where the M2 tentatively assigned to Dermotherium chimaera was found, is in the Bugti Hills of Balochistan, western Pakistan. The fossil locality, placed stratigraphically in the Bugti Member of the Chitarwata Formation, is thought to be Early Oligocene in age. The Paali Nala fauna also contains a diverse array of mammals, including many rodents, some primates, and rhinos.

The specializations of dermopterans are such that they are dependent on a forested habitat, and reconstructions of the paleoenvironments at Krabi, Nong Ya Plong, and Paali Nala suggest that all three fossil deposits developed in a humid, tropical forest environment. Their extinction in the Indian subcontinent may have been caused by the development of a drier climate there during the Late Oligocene.
