= Manaul =

Philippine mythical creature

The Manaul bird is a creature of Philippine folklore. There are at least four existing stories regarding Manaul. "Manaul" (also spelled "Manaol") is also the native common name of two species of large eagles in the Philippines, the Philippine eagle and the white-bellied sea eagle.

== Panay Manaul ==
A Manaul bird was mentioned in the Code of Kalantiaw, a sacred code from the island of Panay. According to this document, the killing of this bird is punishable by death. It is highly believed that the belief surrounding the said Manaul originated during the dominance of the Confederation of Madja-as.

== Mangyan Manaul ==
In Mangyan and Negrito folklore, Manaul was a wrathful king who was imprisoned by King Tubluck Lawi. When Manaul escaped, he later rebelled against all gods and spirits and was punished by Kaptan by throwing rocks at him. The rocks missed Manaul, and created islands, where Manaul rested and lived in peace.

== Tagalog Manaul ==
In Tagalog folklore, it is said that Bathala sent a tigmamanukan omen bird he named "Manaul" to peck on the bamboo. Manaul flew from one side to the other before settling on the bamboo. When Manaul pecked on the bamboo, it opened in half and released the first man, Malakas, and the first woman, Maganda. Manaul afterward flew from right to left again, signaling a labay, or a good omen, to proceed. In other sources, it was the bird form of the deity of peace, Amihan, who pecked the bamboo.

== Bisaya Manaul ==
In Bisaya folklore, the king who guided destinies was Manaul. He provoked the earth and sky to wage a war, and when tired of the war, Manaul clawed rocks from the ocean depths and threw the rocks onto the sea, creating islands.
