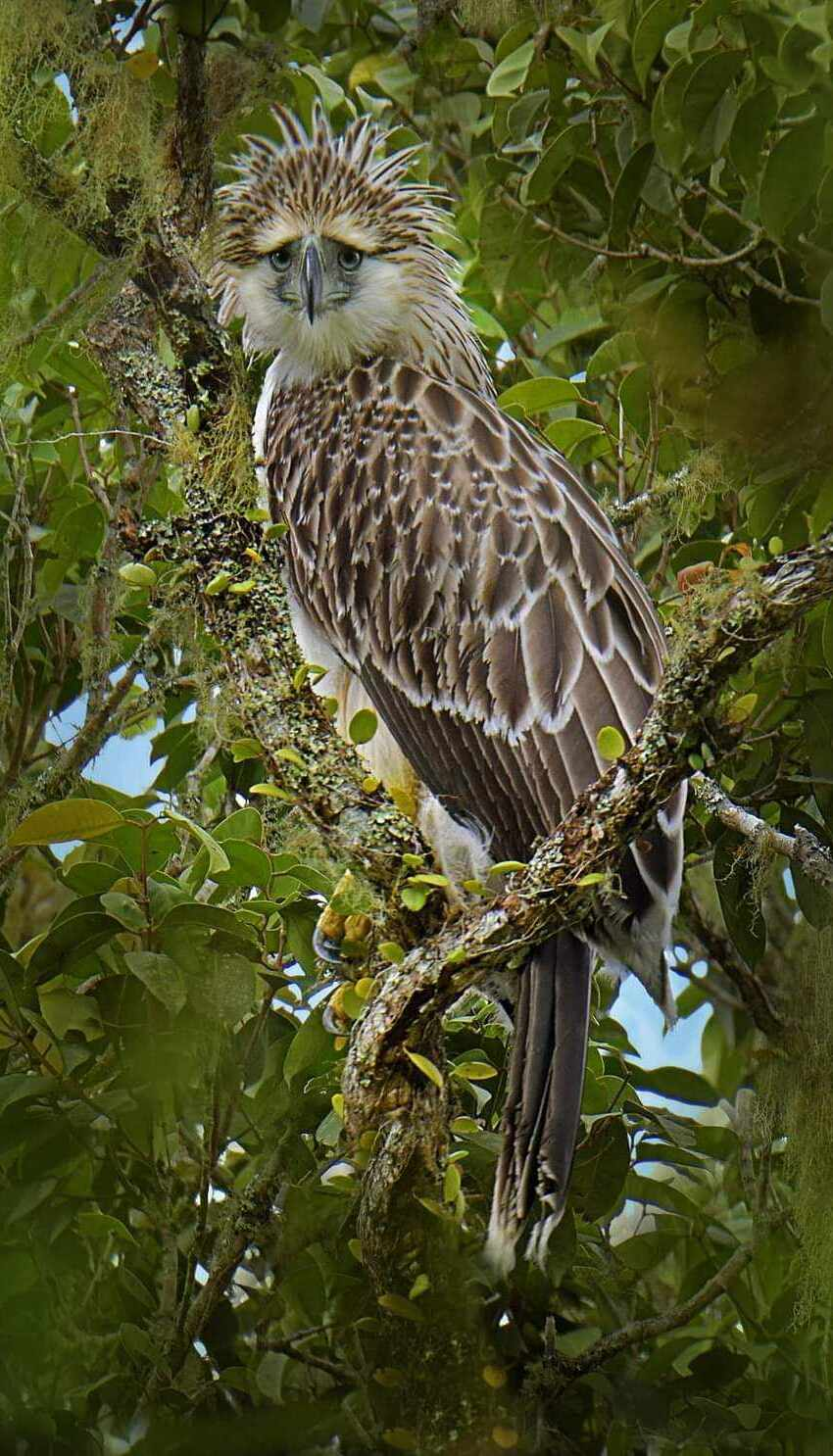
- A wild Philippine eagle in Bukidnon

Conservation status
- Critically Endangered (IUCN 3.1)
- CITES Appendix I

Scientific classification
- Kingdom: Animalia
- Phylum: Chordata
- Class: Aves
- Order: Accipitriformes
- Family: Accipitridae
- Subfamily: Circaetinae
- Genus: Pithecophaga; Ogilvie-Grant, 1896
- Species: P. jefferyi

Binomial name
- Pithecophaga jefferyi Ogilvie-Grant, 1896
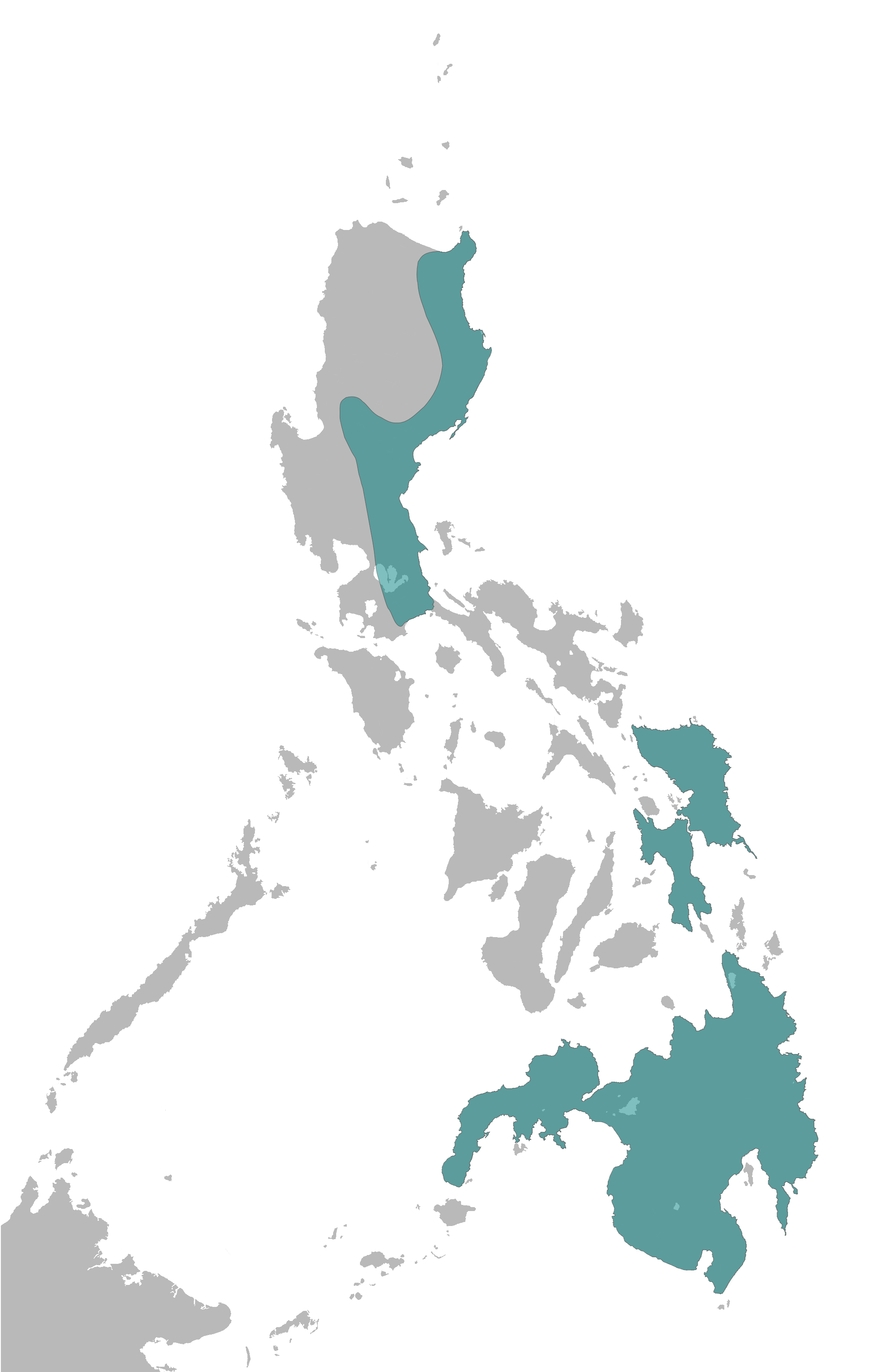
- native range

= Philippine eagle =

Endangered species of eagle in the Philippines

The Philippine eagle (Pithecophaga jefferyi), also known as the monkey-eating eagle or great Philippine eagle, is a critically endangered species of eagle of the family Accipitridae which is endemic to forests in the Philippines. It has brown and white-coloured plumage, a shaggy crest, and generally measures 86 to 102 cm (2.82 to 3.35 ft) in length and weighs 4.04 to 8.0 kg (8.9 to 17.6 lb).

The Philippine eagle is considered the largest of the extant eagles in the world in terms of length and wing surface area, with only Steller's sea eagle and the Harpy eagle being larger in terms of weight and bulk. It has been declared the national bird of the Philippines. It is also depicted in the Philippine one thousand-peso note. The species had been classified by the IUCN Red List as critically endangered with a declining population and is one of the most endangered raptors in the world. The most significant threat to the species is loss of habitat, a result of high levels of deforestation throughout most of its range. Since 2019, more than 20 eagles have been rescued mostly due to injuries from gunshot wounds.

Killing a Philippine eagle is a criminal offence, punishable by law with up to 12 years' imprisonment and heavy fines.

== Names ==
The Philippine eagle has numerous native names in the Philippine languages. These include bánoy and ágila (a Spanish loanword) in Tagalog; manaul or manaol in the Visayan languages; manaol or garuda in Maranao and Maguindanao; tipule in Subanen; and mam-boogook or malamboogook in the Manobo languages, Klata, Tagabawa, Mandaya, and Kalagan. Some of these names are also used for other large eagles in general, such as the white-breasted sea eagle (also called manaul in Visayan). In modern Filipino, it is usually referred to as háribon (a portmanteau of "háring ibon", literally "bird king").

== Taxonomy ==
The first European to study the species was the English explorer and naturalist John Whitehead in 1896, who observed the bird and whose servant, Juan, collected the first specimen a few weeks later. The skin of the bird was sent to William Robert Ogilvie-Grant in London in 1896, who initially showed it off in a local restaurant and described the species a few weeks later.

Upon its scientific discovery, the Philippine eagle was first called the monkey-eating eagle because of reports from natives of Bonga, Samar, where the species was first discovered, that it preyed exclusively on monkeys. These reports gave its generic name, from the Greek pithecus (πίθηκος, "ape" or "monkey") and phagus (-φάγος, "eater of"). The species name commemorates Jeffery Whitehead, the father of John Whitehead. Later studies revealed, however, that the alleged monkey-eating eagle also ate other animals, such as colugos, large snakes, monitor lizards, and even large birds such as hornbills. This, coupled with the fact that the same name applied to the African crowned eagle and the Central and South American harpy eagle, it was renamed "Philippine eagle" in a 1978 proclamation by then-President Ferdinand Marcos. In 1995, it was declared a national emblem under President Fidel V. Ramos. This species has no recognized subspecies.

=== Evolutionary history ===
A 1919 study of the bird's skeletal features led to the suggestion that the nearest relative was the harpy eagle (Harpia harpyja). The species was included in the subfamily Harpiinae until a 2005 study of DNA sequences which identified them as not members of the group, finding instead that the nearest relatives are snake eagles (Circaetinae), such as the bateleur. The species has subsequently been placed in the subfamily Circaetinae.

== Description ==
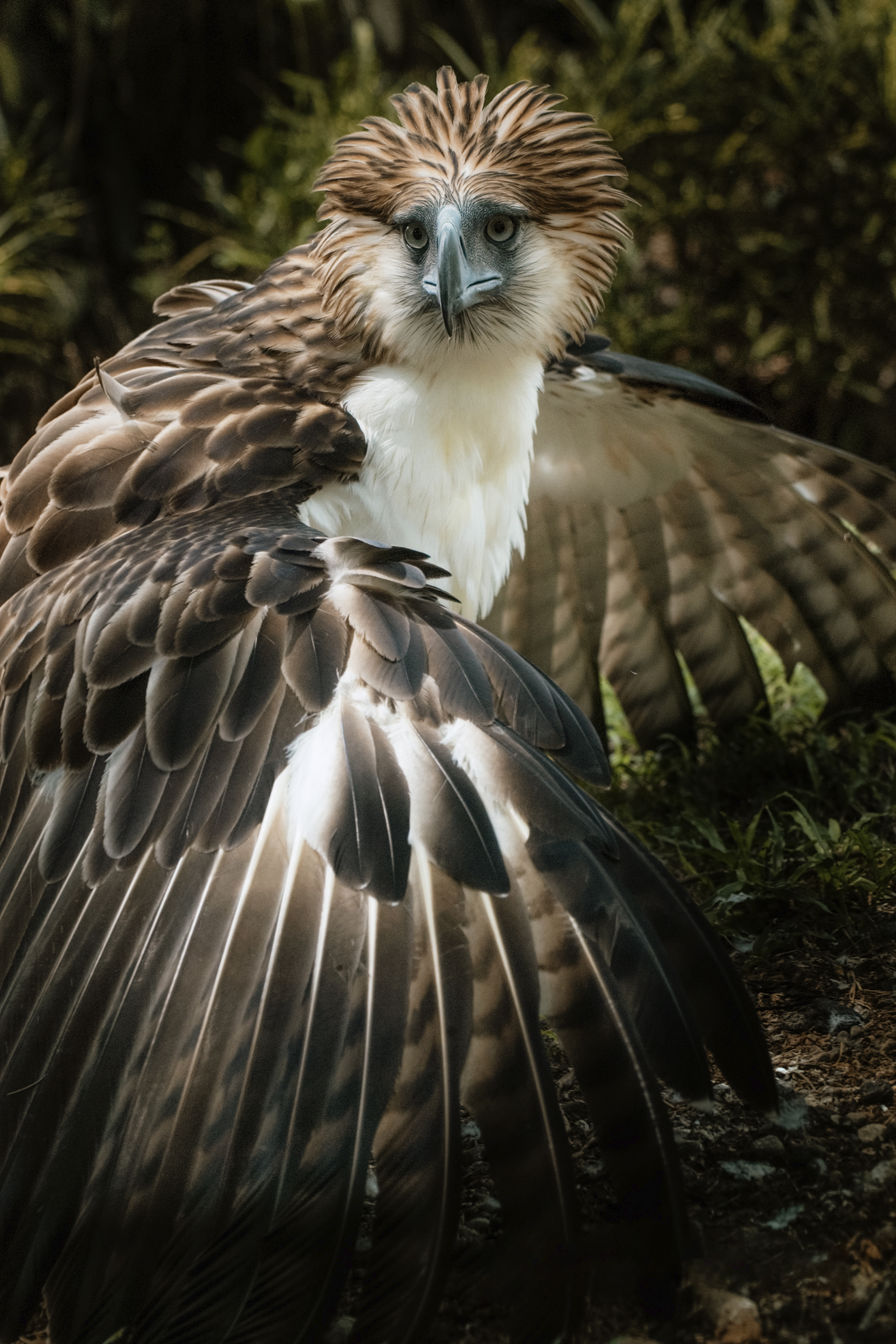
A captive Philippine eagle in Davao City

The Philippine eagle's nape is adorned with long, brown feathers that form a shaggy, mane-like crest. The eagle has a dark face and a creamy-brown nape and crown. The back of the Philippine eagle is dark brown, while the underside and underwings are white. The heavy legs are yellow, with large, powerful, dark claws, and the prominent, large, high-arched, deep beak is a bluish-gray. The eagle's eyes are blue-gray. Juveniles are similar to adults except their upperpart feathers have pale fringes. The Philippine eagle is typically reported as measuring 86–102 cm (2 ft 10 in – 3 ft 4 in) in total length, but a survey of several specimens from some of the largest natural history collections in the world found the average was 95 cm (3 ft 1 in) for males and 105 cm (3 ft 5 in) for females. Based on the latter measurements, this makes it the longest extant species of eagle, as the average for the female equals the maximum reported for the harpy eagle and Steller's sea eagle. The longest Philippine eagle reported anywhere and the longest eagle outside of the extinct Haast's eagle is a specimen from Field Museum of Natural History with a length of 112 cm (3 ft 8 in), but it had been kept in captivity so may not represent the wild individuals due to differences in the food availability.

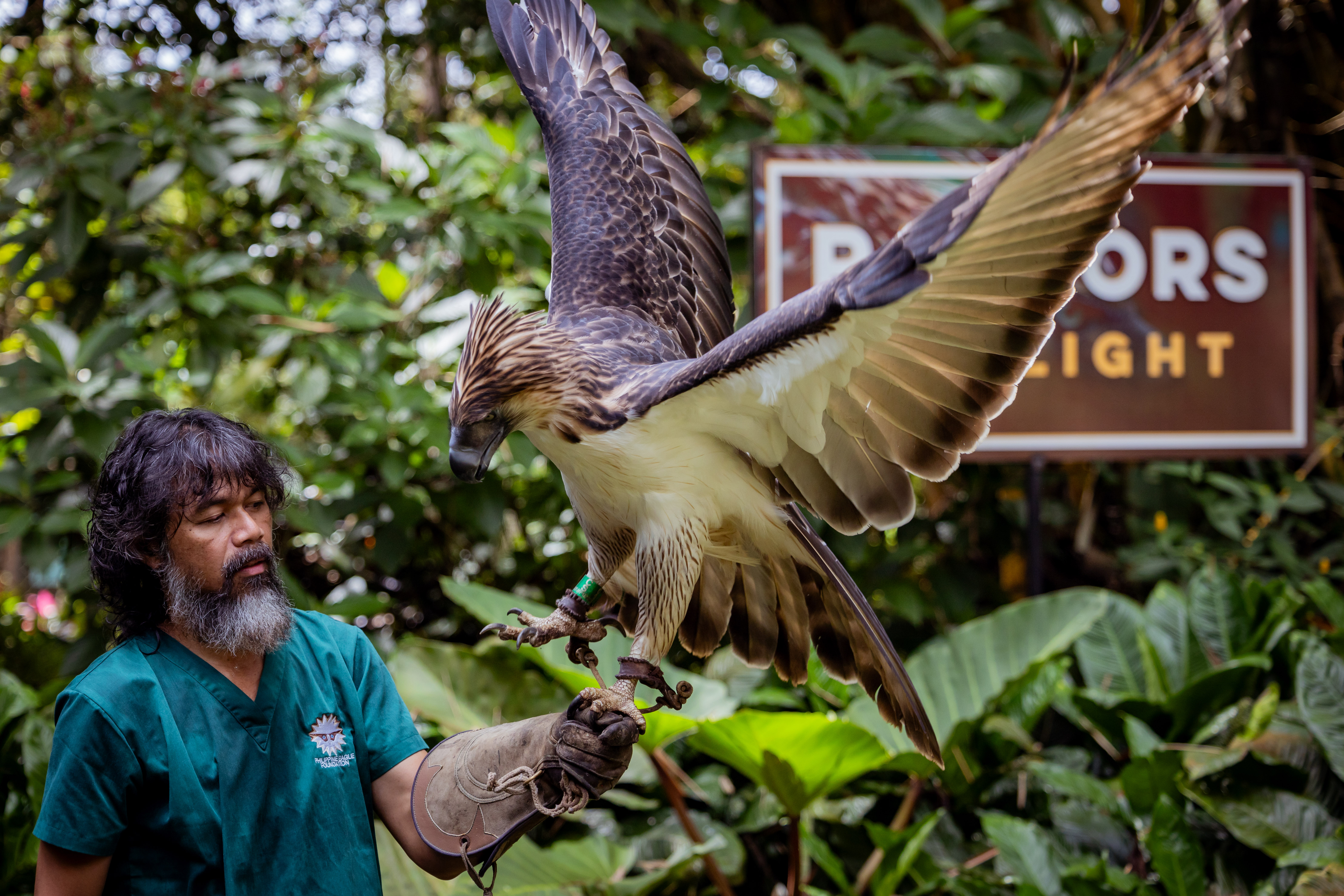
Showing size compared to a human handler

The level of sexual dimorphism in size is not certain, but the male is believed to be typically about 10% smaller than the female, and this is supported by the average length provided for males and females in one source. In many of the other large eagle species, the size difference between adult females and males can exceed 20%. For adult Philippine eagles, the complete weight range has been reported as 4.7 to 8.0 kg (10.4 to 17.6 lb), while others have found the average was somewhat lower than the above range would indicate, at 4.5 kg (9.9 lb) for males and 6.0 kg (13.2 lb) for females. One male (age not specified) was found to weigh 4.04 kg (8.9 lb). The Philippine eagle has a wingspan of 184 to 220 cm (6 ft 0 in to 7 ft 3 in) and a wing chord length of 57.4–61.4 cm (22.6–24.2 in)

The maximum reported weight is surpassed by two other eagles (the harpy and Steller's sea eagles) and the wings are shorter than large eagles of open country (such as the white-tailed eagle, Steller's sea eagle, martial eagle, or wedge-tailed eagle), but are quite broad. The tarsus of the Philippine eagle ties as the longest of any eagle from 12.2 to 14.5 cm (4.8 to 5.7 in) long, which is about the same length as that of the much smaller but relatively long-legged New Guinea eagle. The very large but laterally compressed bill rivals the size of Steller's sea eagle's as the largest bill for an extant eagle. Its bill averages 7.22 cm (2.84 in) in length from the gape. The tail is fairly long at 42–45.3 cm (16.5–17.8 in), while another source lists a tail length of 50 cm (20 in).

The most frequently heard noises made by the Philippine eagle are loud, high-pitched whistles ending with inflections in pitch. Additionally, juveniles have been known to beg for food by a series of high-pitched calls.

== Distribution and habitat ==
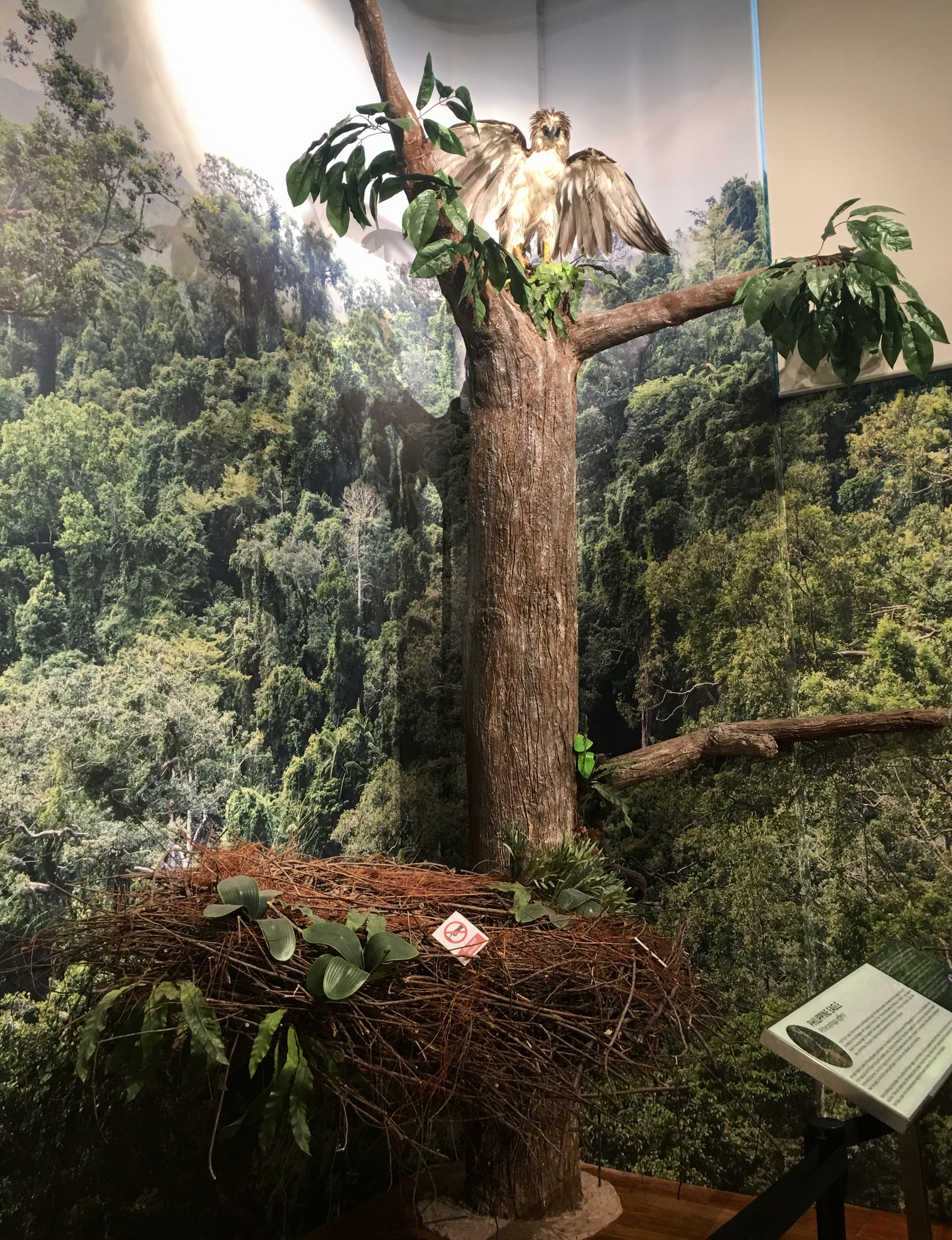
Philippine Eagle's habitat representation in Philippine National Museum

The Philippine eagle is endemic to the Philippines and can be found on four major islands: eastern Luzon, Samar, Leyte, and Mindanao. The largest numbers of eagles reside on Mindanao, with between 82 and 233 breeding pairs. Only six pairs are found on Samar, two on Leyte, and a few on Luzon. It can be found in Northern Sierra Madre National Park on Luzon and Mount Apo, Mount Malindang, and Mount Kitanglad National Parks on Mindanao.

This eagle is found in dipterocarp and mid montane forests, particularly in steep areas. Its elevation ranges from the lowlands to mountains of over 1,800 m (5,900 ft). Only an estimated 9,220 km^{2} (2,280,000 acres) of old-growth forest remain in the bird's range. However, its total estimated range is about 146,000 km^{2} (56,000 sq mi).

== Ecology and behavior ==
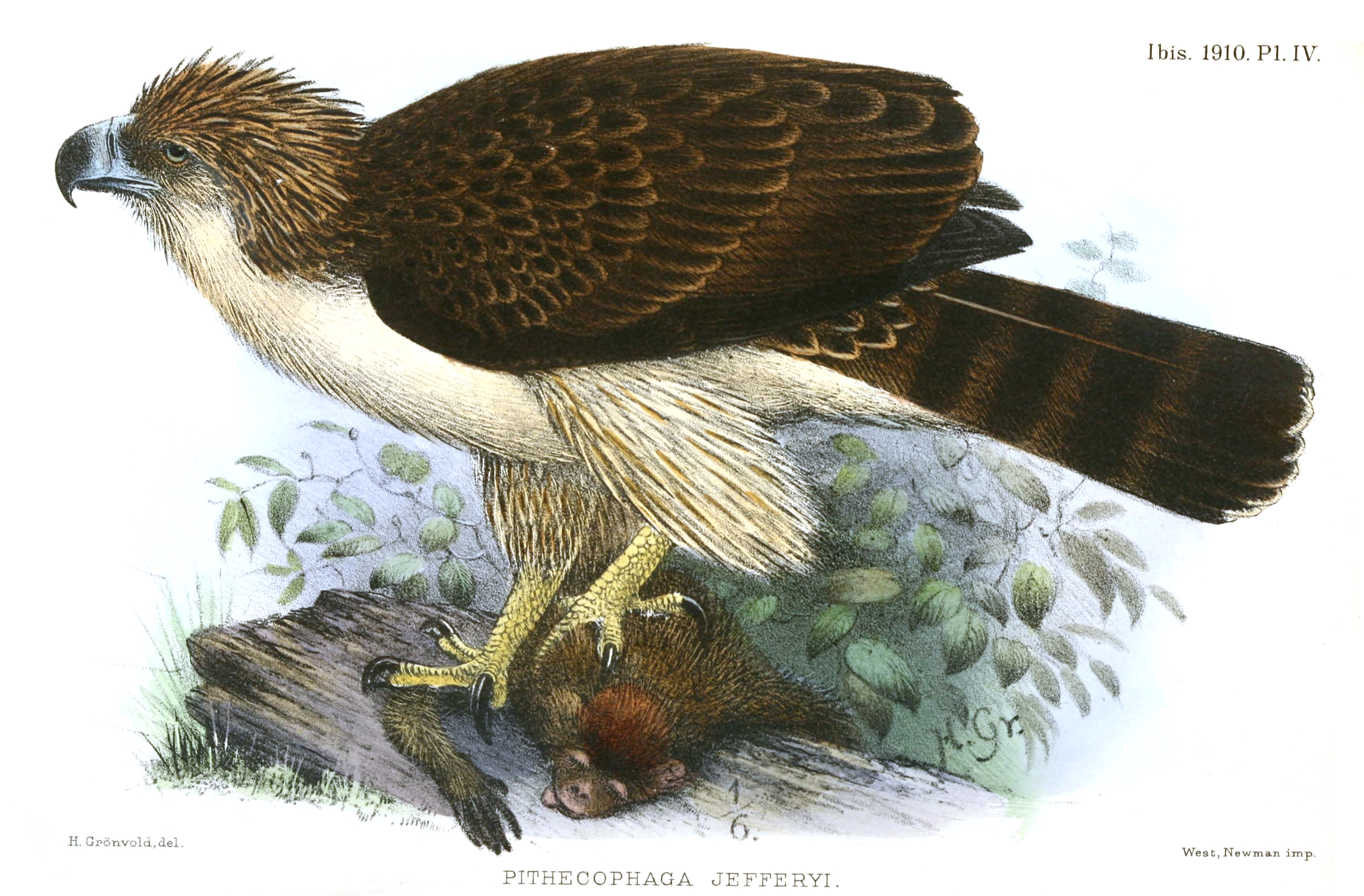
Illustration of a Philippine eagle kept in captivity in London in 1909–1910

Evolution in the Philippines, without other predators, made the eagles the dominant hunter in the Philippine forests. The Philippine eagle has a wide range of prey which includes birds, reptiles and mammals (mainly civets and colugos). Each breeding pair requires a large home range to successfully raise a chick, thus the species is extremely vulnerable to deforestation. Earlier, the territory has been estimated at 100 km^{2} (39 mi^{2}), but a study on Mindanao Island found the nearest distance between breeding pairs to be about 13 km (8.1 mi) on average, resulting in a circular plot of 133 km^{2} (51 mi^{2}).

The species' flight is fast and agile, resembling the smaller hawks more than similar large birds of prey.

Juveniles in play behavior have been observed gripping knotholes in trees with their talons, and using their tails and wings for balance, inserting their heads into tree cavities. Additionally, they have been known to attack inanimate objects for practice, as well as attempt to hang upside down to work on their balance. As the parents are not nearby when this occurs, they apparently do not play a role in teaching the juvenile to hunt.

Life expectancy for a wild eagle is estimated to be from 30 to 60 years. A captive Philippine eagle lived for 41 years in Rome Zoo, and it was already an adult when it arrived at the zoo. Another captive Philippine eagle lived for 46 years at the Philippine Eagle Center in Davao City. However, wild birds on average are believed to live shorter lives than captive birds.

=== Diet ===
The Philippine eagle was known initially as the Philippine monkey-eating eagle because it was believed to feed on monkeys almost exclusively. The only two monkeys native to the Philippines are Philippine long-tailed macaque and common long-tailed macaques, both are subspecies of crab-eating macaque and weighing 4.7 to 8.3 kg (10 to 18 lb) in males and 2.5 to 5.7 kg (5.5 to 12.6 lb) in females. Though Philippine eagles do prey on these monkeys, they are an opportunist apex predator, taking prey based on their local level of abundance and ease. This misconception may have come from the first examined specimen which was found to have undigested pieces of a monkey in its stomach.

Prey specimens found at the eagle's nest have ranged in size from a small bat weighing 10 g (0.35 oz) to a Philippine deer weighing 14 kg (31 lb). The primary prey is usually the tree squirrel-sized Philippine flying lemurs, which can make up an estimated 90% of the raptor's diet in some locations. However, primary prey species vary from island to island depending on species availability, particularly in Luzon and Mindanao, because the islands are in different faunal regions. For example, flying lemurs are preferred prey in Mindanao, but are absent in Luzon. The primary prey for the eagles seen in Luzon are macaques, reptiles, and Northern Luzon giant cloud rat (Phloeomys pallidus) which can weigh twice as much as flying lemurs at 2 to 2.5 kg (4.4 to 5.5 lb). In many regions, civets are taken as supplemental prey, mainly cat-sized Asian palm civets (Paradoxurus hermaphroditus) but occasionally larger Malay civets (Viverra tangalunga). Other mammalian prey can include flying squirrels, tree squirrels, flying foxes, rats and mouse-deer. Birds are also taken, including large species such as owls, hawks and hornbills. Reptiles occasionally form a large part of their diet, snakes such as Ptyas luzonensis and Gonyosoma oxycephalum are mainly taken. Venomous pit vipers (Viperidae) are also taken as prey, and in one instance, a breeding pair delivered a Philippine cobra (Naja philippinensis) to the nest. Monitor lizards, including marbled water monitors (Varanus marmoratus) and even larger Northern Sierra Madre forest monitors (Varanus bitatawa) have been taken. While most of the prey consists of wild prey, they have been reported to capture domestic fowls (Gallus gallus domesticus), cats (Felis catus), young pigs (Sus domesticus) and small dogs (Canis familiaris).

Philippine eagles primarily use two hunting techniques. One is still-hunting, in which it watches for prey activity while sitting almost motionlessly on a branch near the canopy. The other is perch-hunting, which entails periodically gliding from one perch to another. While perch-hunting, they often work their way gradually down from the canopy down the branches, and if not successful in finding prey in their initial foray, they fly or circle back up to the top of the trees to work them again. Eagles in Mindanao often find success using the latter method while hunting flying lemurs, since they are nocturnal animals that try to use camouflage to protect themselves by day. Eagle pairs sometimes hunt troops of monkeys cooperatively, with one bird perching nearby to distract the primates, allowing the other to swoop in from behind, hopefully unnoticed, for the kill. Since the native macaque is aggressive and often around the same size as the eagle itself or even larger, up to 9 kg (20 lb) in adult males, it is a potentially hazardous prey, and an eagle has been reported to suffer a broken leg after it struggled and fell along with a large male monkey.

=== Reproduction ===
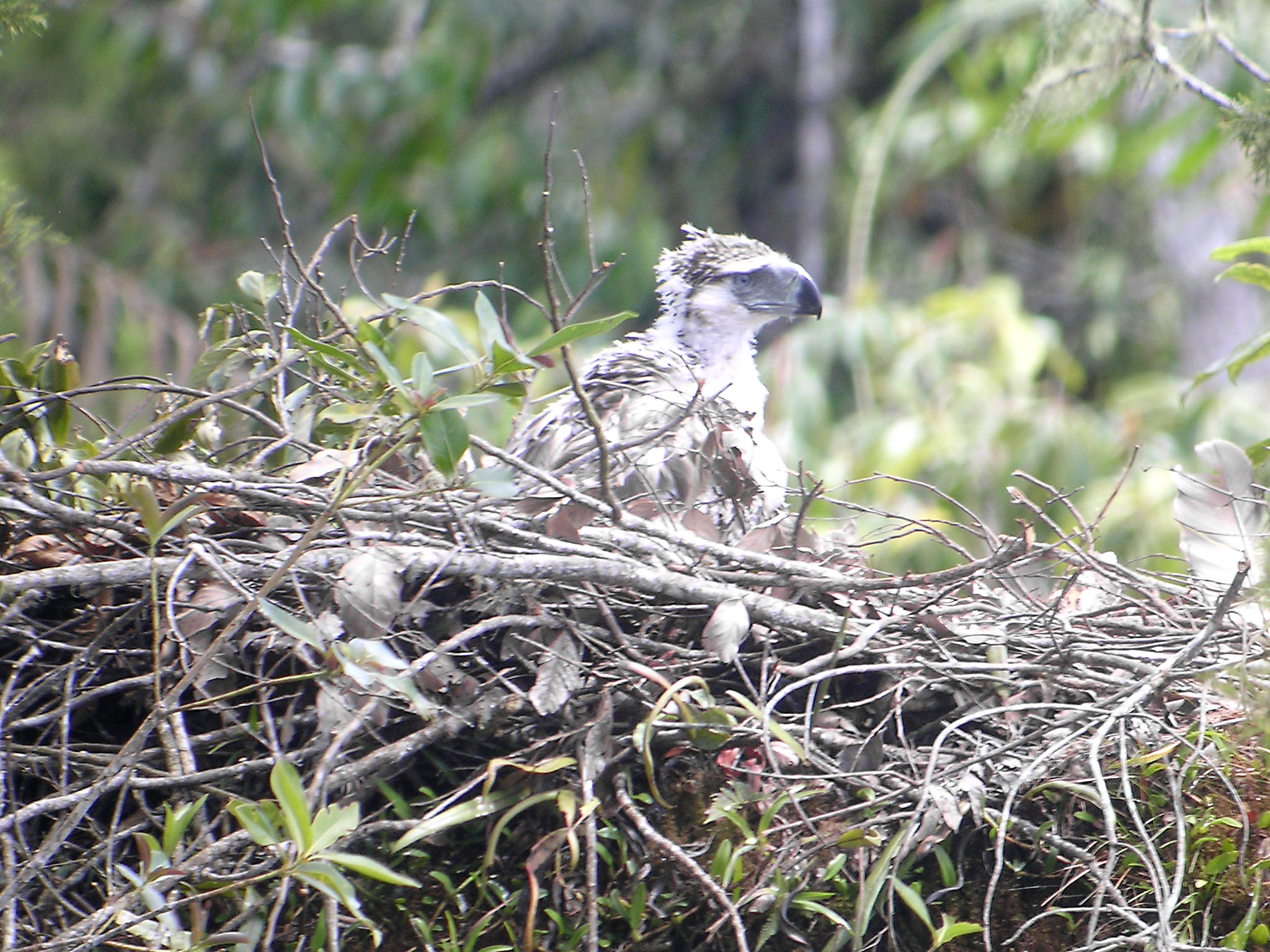
A Philippine eagle nestling

The complete breeding cycle of the Philippine eagle lasts two years. The female matures sexually at five years of age and the male at seven. Like most eagles, the Philippine eagle is monogamous. Once paired, a couple remains together for the rest of their lives. If one dies, the remaining eagle often searches for a new mate to replace the one lost.

The beginning of courtship is signaled by nest-building, and the eagle remaining near its nest. Aerial displays also play a major role in the courtship. These displays include paired soaring over a nesting territory, the male chasing the female in a diagonal dive, and mutual talon presentation, where the male presents his talons to the female's back and she flips over in midair to present her own talons. Advertisement displays coupled with loud calling have also been reported. The willingness of an eagle to breed is displayed by the eagle bringing nesting materials to the bird's nest. Copulation follows and occurs repeatedly both on the nest and on nearby perches. The earliest courtship has been reported in July.

Breeding season is in July; birds on different islands, most notably Mindanao and Luzon, begin breeding at different ends of this range. The amount of rainfall and population of prey may also affect the breeding season. The nest is normally built on an emergent dipterocarp, or any tall tree with an open crown, in primary or disturbed forest. The nests are lined with green leaves, and can be around 1.5 m (4.9 ft) across. The nesting location is around 30 m (98 ft) or even more above the ground. As in many other large raptors, the eagle's nest resembles a huge platform made of sticks. The eagle frequently reuses the same nesting site for several different chicks. Eight to 10 days before the egg is ready to be laid, the female is afflicted with a condition known as egg lethargy. In this experience, the female does not eat, drinks much water, and holds her wings droopingly. The female typically lays one egg in the late afternoon or at dusk, although occasionally two have been reported. If an egg fails to hatch or the chick dies early, the parents likely lay another egg the following year. Copulation may take place a few days after the egg is laid to enable another egg to be laid should the first one fail. The egg is incubated for 58 to 68 days (typically 62 days) after being laid. Both sexes participate in the incubation, but the female does the majority of incubating during the day and all of it at night.

Both sexes help feed the newly hatched eaglet. Additionally, the parents have been observed taking turns shielding the eaglet from the sun and rain until it is seven weeks old. The young eaglet fledges after four or five months. The earliest an eagle has been observed making a kill is 304 days after hatching. Both parents take care of the eaglet for a total of 20 months and, unless the previous nesting attempt had failed, the eagles can breed only in alternate years. The Philippine eagle rivals two other large tropical eagles, namely the crowned eagle and harpy eagle, for having the longest breeding cycle of any bird of prey. Even nests have no predators other than humans, as even known nest predators such as palm civets and macaques (being prey species) are likely to actively avoid any area with regular eagle activity.

== Conservation ==
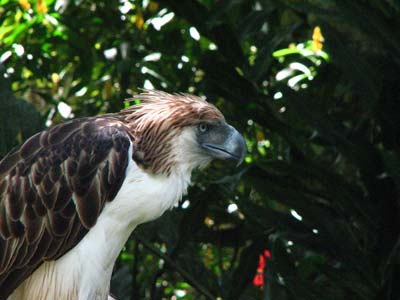
A Philippine eagle named Sir Arny, at the Philippine Eagle Center, Davao City

In 1994, the IUCN and BirdLife International listed this species as critically endangered. The IUCN believed that between 180 and 500 Philippine eagles survive in the Philippines. In 2015, about 600 were estimated to be left in the wild. The Zoological Society of London listed the Philippine eagle as the top 15 EDGE species, out of all the world's recorded species, making it the Philippines' most "evolutionary distinct and globally endangered" species.

They are threatened primarily by deforestation through logging and expanding agriculture. Old-growth forest is being lost at a high rate, and most of the forest in the lowlands is owned by logging companies. Mining, pollution, exposure to pesticides that affect breeding, and poaching are also major threats. Additionally, they are occasionally caught in traps laid by local people for deer. Though this is no longer a major problem, the eagle's numbers were also reduced by being captured for zoos. The diminishing numbers of the Philippine eagle were first brought to international attention in 1965 by the noted Filipino ornithologist Dioscoro S. Rabor, and the director of the Parks and Wildlife Office, Jesus A. Alvarez. Charles Lindbergh, best known for crossing the Atlantic alone and without stopping in 1927, was fascinated by this eagle. As a representative of the World Wildlife Fund, Lindbergh traveled to the Philippines several times between 1969 and 1972, where he helped persuade the government to protect the eagle. In 1969, the Monkey-eating Eagle Conservation Program was started to help preserve this species. In 1992, the first Philippine eagles were hatched in captivity through artificial insemination; however, the first naturally bred eaglet was not hatched until 1999. The first captive-bred bird to be released in the wild, Kabayan, was released in 2004 on Mindanao; however, he was accidentally electrocuted in January 2005. Another eagle, Kagsabua, was released in March 2008, but was shot and eaten by a farmer. In June 2015, an eagle was released after being treated for a gunshot wound; two months later it was shot and killed. Killing this critically endangered species is punishable under Philippine law by 12 years in jail and heavy fines. Its numbers have slowly dwindled over the decades to the current population of 180 to 600 eagles. A series of floods and mud slides, caused by deforestation, further devastated the remaining population. The Philippine eagle may soon no longer be found in the wild, unless direct intervention is taken. The Philippine Eagle Foundation in Davao City, is one organization dedicated to the protection and conservation of the Philippine eagle and its forest habitat. The Philippine Eagle Foundation has successfully bred Philippine eagles in captivity for over a decade and conducted the first experimental release of a captive-bred eagle to the wild. As of 2025, The foundation has bred 31 eagles in captivity, though breeding has slowed in recent years, during which the respectively 28-30th chicks were bred, in 2016, 2021 and 2024. Unfortunately, the 29th and 30th chicks were not able to make it to adulthood. In 2025, the 31st chick, named Riley, was hatched and died on the 16th of April of the same year; the cause was undisclosed. This chick is especially significant as this is the first ever chick born through a natural pair as all previous chicks were bred via artificial insemination.

Ongoing research on behavior, ecology, and population dynamics is also underway. In recent years, protected lands have been established specifically for this species, such as the 700 km^{2} (170,000 acres) of Cabuaya Forest and the 37.2 km^{2} (9,200 acres) of Taft Forest Wildlife Sanctuary on Samar. However, a large proportion of the population is found on unprotected land.

=== Reintroduction to Leyte ===
In 2024, the Philippine Eagle Foundation decided to start a project which would involve the transplantation of Philippine eagles in Leyte where this species survives but may have been extirpated as the last records were prior to Typhoon Haiyan (Yolanda) in 2013 which devastated the forests and have had no sightings since then. In June 2024, 2 rescued and non-paired eagles with tracking devices from Mindanao were released. They were released in hopes that they would form a pair but this project faced a significant setback when the male named "Uswag" was found dead at sea. Researchers believed that this eagle got blown off course and drowned at sea. As of October 2024, the female named "Carlito" was documented alive and is hunting and able to fend for itself.

=== Philippine Eagle Diplomacy ===
In a June 2019 wildlife loan agreement, a pair of Philippine eagles; (as of 2019) Geothermica, a 15 year old male and Sambisig (meaning one unity) a 17 year old female, were loaned to the Jurong Bird Park Singapore. This was part of conservation efforts for the species and also commemorated 50 years friendship between the Philippines and Singapore. Before the pair were shipped, they were given 2 specially printed passports dedicated to them. The pair were scheduled to stay at Singapore for 10 years as part of the agreement. The move marked the initiation of the government's Philippine Eagle Diplomacy program. As of 2024, Geothermica had died from lung infection, his body now taxidermied at the National Museum, while Sambisig remained in Singapore at the new bird park that replaced Jurong. Despite this setback, Singapore Zoo and the Philippine Eagle Foundation maintain that this breeding program will continue and it will be likely that another possible mate for "Sambisig" will be loaned.

In August 2024, the Philippine Eagle Foundation launched the Philippine Eagle Geothermica's Gateway Project facility as tribute to 19-year-old Geothermica, who died from an Aspergillus molds' fungal infection at the Bird Paradise, Mandai Wild Reserve in September 2022. His sculpture stands in the center of the new facility while his taxidermied body is currently displayed at the National Museum of the Philippines. The PEF partnered with Mandai Wildlife Group, United Architects of the Philippines-Davao City and Kublai Millan for the project.

== Cultural significance ==
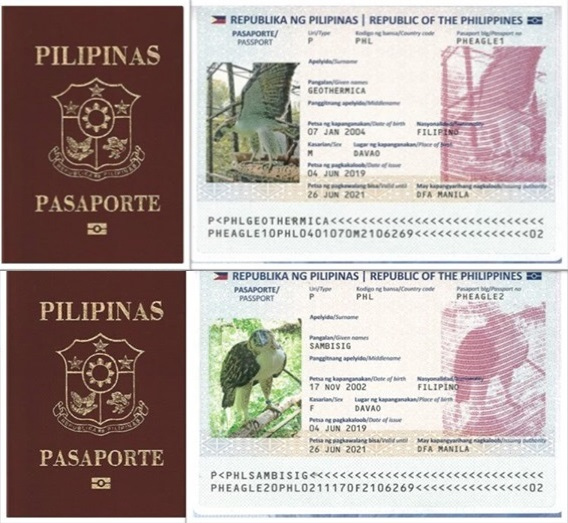
Symbolic passports issued to Geothermica and Sambisig, individual eagles which were loaned to Singapore

=== Folklore ===
The Manaul, a legendary bird in ancient Bisaya folklore and the namesake for its Bisaya local name, is identified with both the Philippine eagle and the white-bellied sea eagle. It is prominently featured in numerous legends and creation myths.

Manaul is most prominently featured in a Visayan creation myth where it is said that in the beginning, only three things existed in the world: the sea, the sky, and the bird Manaul. Manaul grew tired of flying and looked for a place to rest, but could not find one, so he decides to incite the god of the sky, Kaptan, and the goddess of the sea, Magwayen (also spelled Maguayen or Magauayen) into waging a war against each other. This led to the god of sky sending down storms and whirlwinds, while the goddess of the sea sent up tidal waves. Their battle, which lasted for a very long time, eventually resulted in the creation of dry land. Manaul, tired of their fighting, decided to stop them by dropping boulders on them to separate the wind and the waves (some sources say Manaul clawed them from the sea floor, while others say it came from the newly-created mountains). This ended the battle while also creating the islands of the Philippines. There are other slightly different versions of the myth from different ethnic groups, but they all contain the same elements.

Manaul is also regarded as the bird that found the first human beings and pecked them free from a bamboo stem.

In Tagalog folklore, both of these creation myths are instead associated with the deity of the northeast monsoon winds, Amihan, who is also personified as a bird.

=== National symbol of the Philippines ===
The Philippine eagle was officially declared the national bird of the Philippines on July 4, 1995, by President Fidel V. Ramos under Proclamation No. 615, series of 1995. Due to the eagle's size and rarity, it is also a coveted species for birdwatchers.

The Philippine eagle has been featured on at least 12 stamps from the Philippines, with dates ranging from 1967 to 2007. It was also depicted on the 50-sentimo coins minted from 1983 to 1994; in 2018, on the 500-Piso commemorative silver coin, to celebrate the 25th anniversary of Bangko Sentral ng Pilipinas; on January 18, 2021, and on the 5,000-Piso Lapulapu commemorative non-circulating banknote. On December 11, 2021, the Bangko Sentral ng Pilipinas unveiled the design of the new 1,000-Piso polymer banknote featuring the bird as the main portrait, controversially replacing those of three World War II martyrs: Chief Justice José Abad Santos, suffragist Josefa Llanes Escoda, and General Vicente Lim.

The Philippine eagle is also used in sporting events as a mascot, most notably one in the 2005 Southeast Asian Games held in Manila known as "Gilas". The Philippine eagle is also the animal used in the Philippines men's national basketball team or Gilas Pilipinas' logo/team crest.

=== Conservation ===
Historically, about 50 Philippine eagles have been kept in zoos in Europe (England, Germany, Belgium, Italy and France), the United States, and Japan. The first was a female that arrived in London Zoo in August 1909 and died there in February 1910. The majority arrived in zoos between 1947 and 1965. The last outside the Philippines died in 1988 in the Antwerp Zoo, where it had lived since 1964 (except for a period at the Planckendael Zoo in Belgium).

The first captive breeding was only achieved in 1992 at the facility of the Philippine Eagle Foundation in Davao City, which has bred it 31 times as of 2025.

== See also ==
- List of endemic birds of the Philippines
- List of birds of the Philippines
- Pag-asa (eagle)
