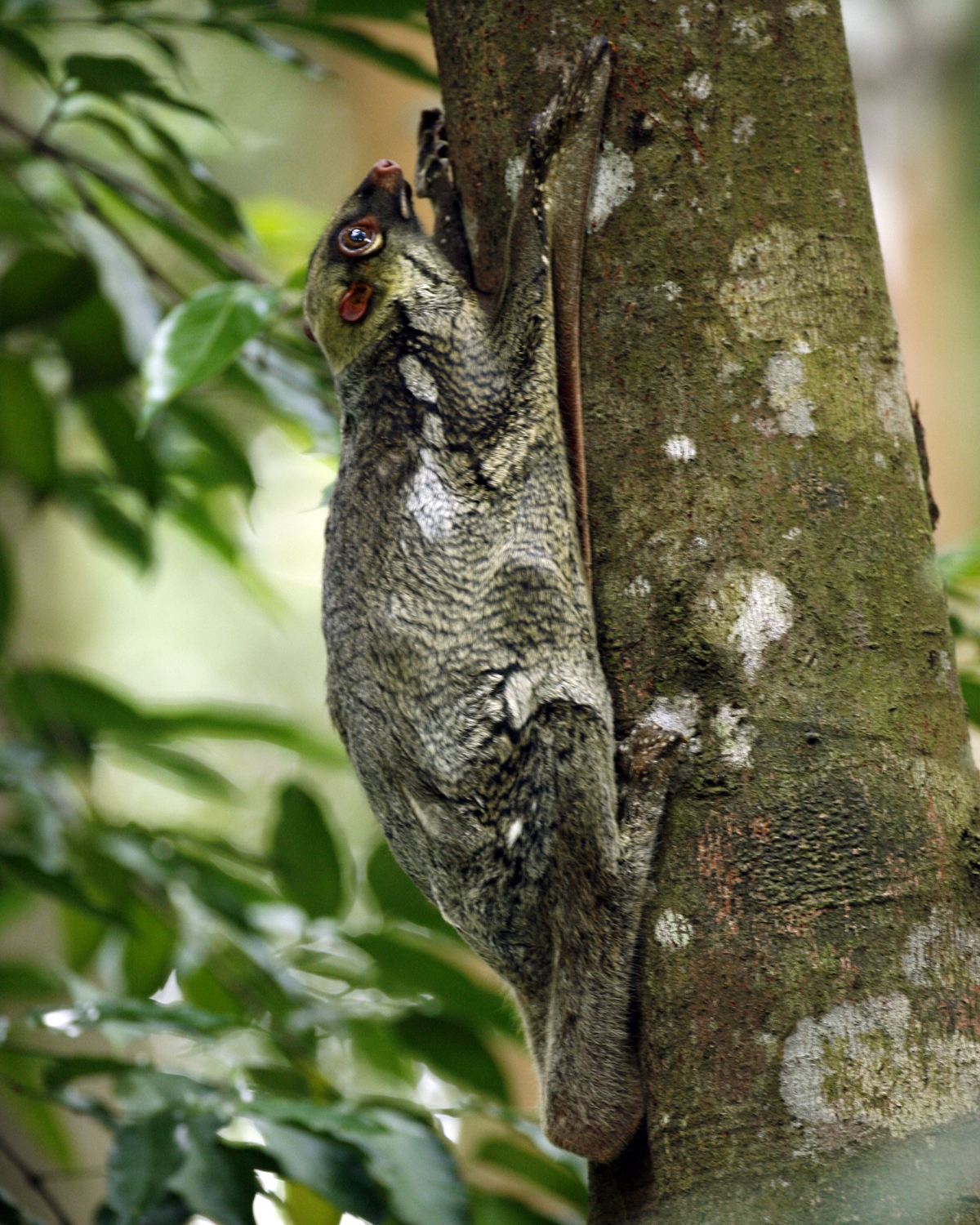
- Sunda flying lemur

Scientific classification
- Kingdom: Animalia
- Phylum: Chordata
- Class: Mammalia
- Superorder: Euarchontoglires
- Grandorder: Euarchonta
- Mirorder: Primatomorpha
- Order: Dermoptera; Illiger, 1811
- Family: Cynocephalidae; Simpson, 1945

Type genus
- Cynocephalus Boddaert, 1768

Genera
- Cynocephalus Galeopterus † Dermotherium
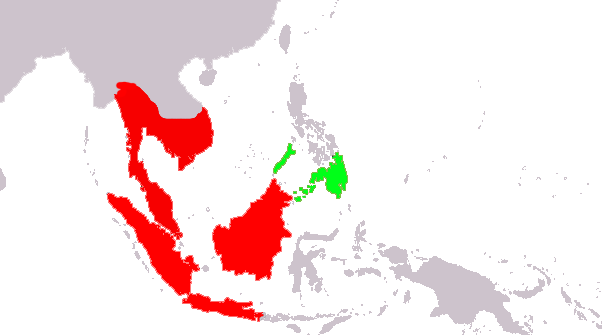

Synonyms
- Colugidae; Galeopithecidae; Galeopteridae; Galeopithidae

= Colugo =

Colugos Temporal range: Eocene-Present, 37–0 Ma

Family of mammals

Colugos (/kəˈluːɡoʊ/), flying lemurs, or cobegos (/kəˈbiːɡoʊ/), are arboreal gliding primatomorphs that are native to Southeast Asia. Their evolutionary closest relatives are primates. There are just two living species of colugos: the Sunda flying lemur (Galeopterus variegatus) and the Philippine flying lemur (Cynocephalus volans). These two species make up the entire family Cynocephalidae (/ˌsaɪnoʊˌsɛfəˈlaɪdi, -ˌkɛ-/) (Note: Cf. words with analogous pronunciations such as Meningoencephalitis, see "Meningoencephalitis". Lexico UK English Dictionary UK English Dictionary. Oxford University Press. Archived from the original on 22 March 2020.) and order Dermoptera, from Ancient Greek δέρμα (dérma), meaning "skin", and πτερόν (pterón), meaning "wing".

== Characteristics ==
Colugos are nocturnal, tree-dwelling, gliding mammals.

=== Appearance and anatomy ===
They reach lengths of 35 to 40 cm (14 to 16 in) and weigh 1 to 2 kg (2.2 to 4.4 lb). They have long, slender front and rear limbs, a medium-length tail, and a relatively light build. The head is small, with large, front-focused eyes for excellent binocular vision, and small rounded ears.

The incisor teeth of colugos are highly distinctive; they are comb-like in shape with up to 20 tines on each tooth. The incisors are analogous in appearance and function to the incisor suite in strepsirrhines, which is used for grooming. The second upper incisors have two roots, another unique feature among mammals. The dental formula of colugos is: 2.1.2.33.1.2.3

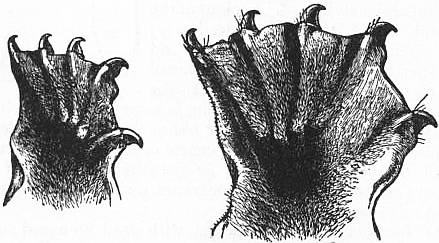
Feet of Philippine colugo

=== Movement ===
Colugos are proficient gliders, and thought to be better adapted for flight than any other gliding mammal. They can travel as far as 70 m (230 ft) from one tree to another without losing much altitude, with a Malayan colugo (Galeopterus variegatus) individual having been observed traveling about 150 m (490 ft) in one glide.

Their ability to glide is possible because of a large membrane of skin that extends between their paired limbs. This gliding membrane, or patagium, runs from the shoulder blades to the fore paws, from the tip of the rear-most fingers to the tip of the toes, and from the hind legs to the tip of the tail. Colugos' gliding ability is aided by specialized muscles that control the tension and movement of the gliding membrane. The platysma myoides and platysma cervicale help adjust the patagium’s shape for better control during flight. The sternomastoideus and cleidomastoideus stabilize the head and neck, improving balance and maneuverability mid-air. The spaces between the colugo's fingers and toes are webbed. As a result, colugos were once considered to be close relatives of bats. Today, on account of genetic data, they are considered to be more closely related to primates.

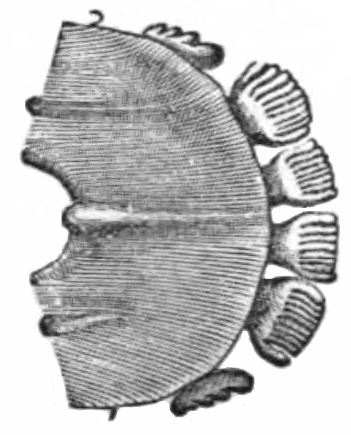
Lower jaw (Galeopterus)

Colugos are unskilled climbers; they lack opposable thumbs. They progress up trees in a series of slow hops, gripping onto the bark with their small, sharp claws. They spend most of the day resting. At night, colugos spend most of their time up in the trees foraging, with gliding being used to either find another foraging tree or to find possible mates and protect territory.

=== Behavior and diet ===
Colugos are shy, nocturnal, solitary animals found in the tropical forests of Southeast Asia. Consequently, very little is known about their behavior. They are herbivorous and eat leaves, shoots, flowers, sap, and fruit. They have well-developed stomachs and long intestines capable of extracting nutrients from leaves and other fibrous material.

As part of colugos' evolution into nocturnal species, they developed night vision. Colugos spend their days resting in tree holes and are active at night time; traveling around 1.7 kilometres (1.1 miles) at night. Colugos may also be a territorial species.

=== Life cycle ===
Although they are placentals, colugos raise their young in a manner similar to marsupials. Newborn colugos are underdeveloped and weigh only 35 g (1.2 oz). They spend the first six months of life clinging to their mother's belly. The mother colugo curls her tail and folds her patagium into a warm, secure, quasi-pouch to protect and transport her young. The young do not reach maturity until they are two to three years old. In captivity, they live up to 15 years, but their lifespan in the wild is unknown.

== Status ==
Both species are threatened by habitat destruction, and the Philippine flying lemur was once classified by the IUCN as vulnerable. In 1996, the IUCN declared the species vulnerable owing to destruction of lowland forests and hunting. It was downlisted to least-concern status in 2008 but still faces the same threats. In addition to the ongoing clearing of its rainforest habitat, it is hunted for its meat and fur. It is also a favorite prey item for the critically endangered Philippine eagle; some studies suggest colugos account for 90% of the eagle's diet.

== Etymology ==
Their family name Cynocephalidae comes from the Ancient Greek κύων (kúon), meaning "dog", and κεφαλή (kephalḗ), meaning "head", because their heads are broad with short snouts like dogs.

== Summary of extant species ==
Common name	Binomial name	Population	Status	Trend	Notes	Image
Sunda flying lemur	Galeopterus variegatus	unknown	LC	▼		
Philippine flying lemur	Cynocephalus volans	unknown	LC	Steady		

== Classification and evolution ==
The ancestors of the colugos are estimated to split from other mammals about 80 million years ago, leading to the present-day forms, which may include up to 14 extant species. Mixodectidae and Plagiomenidae are two extinct families of North American mammals which may represent fossil dermopterans or at least close relatives. However, some studies doubt a close relationship between these families and modern dermopterans (Cynocephalidae). A complete skeleton of Mixodectes shows that, though it was well-adapted for an arboreal lifestyle, it had no adaptations for gliding. Although other Paleogene mammals have been interpreted as related to dermopterans, the evidence for this association is uncertain and many of the fossils are no longer interpreted as being gliding mammals. At present, the fossil record of definitive dermopterans is limited to two species of the Eocene and Oligocene cynocephalid genus Dermotherium.

Molecular phylogenetic studies have demonstrated that colugos emerged as a basal Primatomorpha clade – which, in turn, is a basal Euarchontoglires clade. Scandentia are widely considered to be the closest relatives of Primatomorpha, within Euarchonta. Some studies, however, place Scandentia as sister of Glires (lagomorphs and rodents), in an unnamed sister clade of the Primatomorpha.

- Euarchontoglires
  - - Scandentia (treeshrews)
    - Glires
      - Lagomorpha (rabbits, hares, pikas)
      - Rodentia (rodents)
  - Primatomorpha
    - Dermoptera (colugos)
    - - †Plesiadapiformes
      - Primates

- Order Dermoptera
  - †Family Plagiomenidae?
  - †Family Mixodectidae?
  - Family Cynocephalidae
    - Cynocephalus
      - Philippine flying lemur, Cynocephalus volans
    - Galeopterus
      - Sunda flying lemur, Galeopterus variegatus
    - †Dermotherium
      - †Dermotherium major
      - †Dermotherium chimaera

== Gallery ==
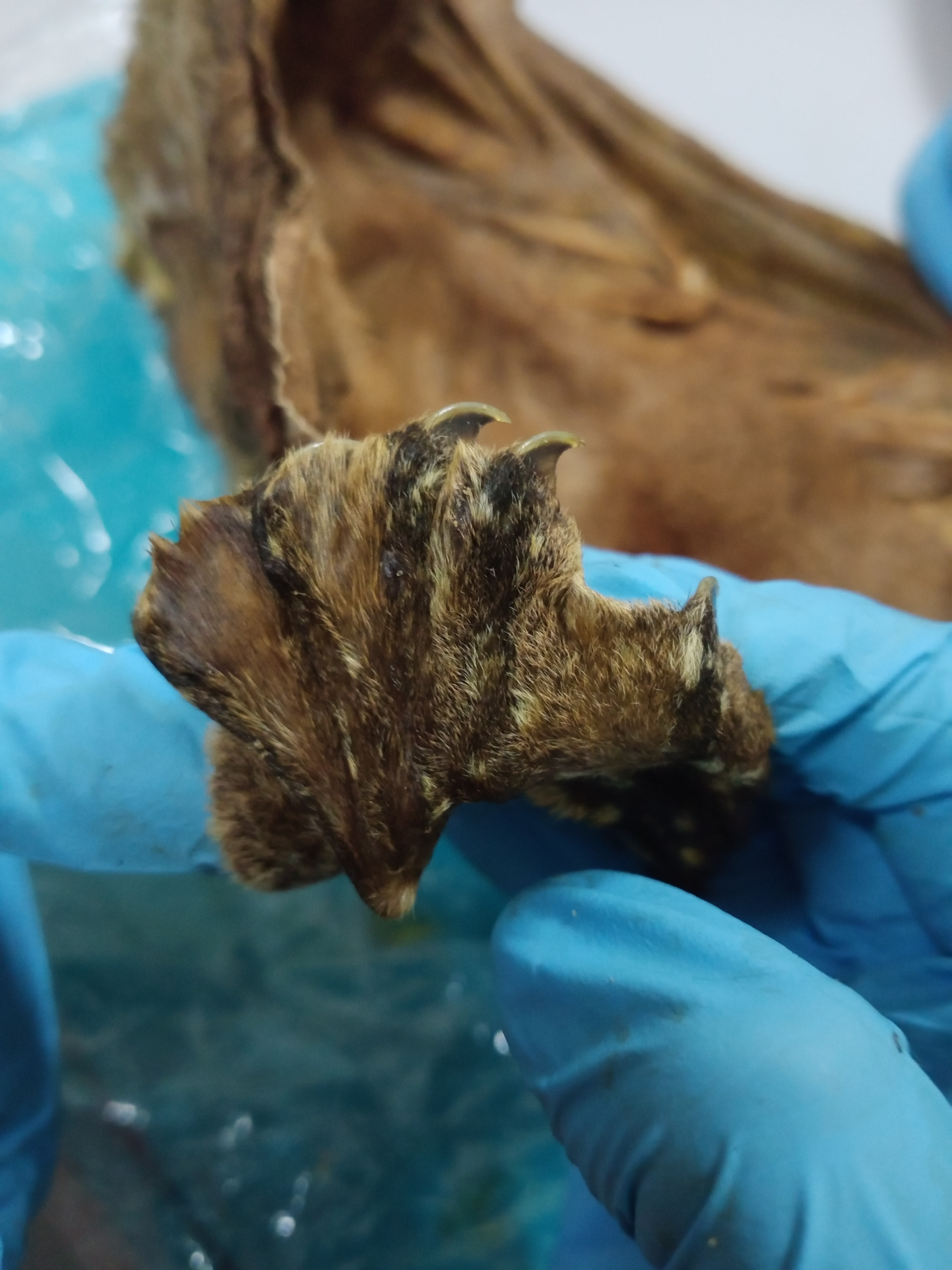
Claw of Sunda flying lemur

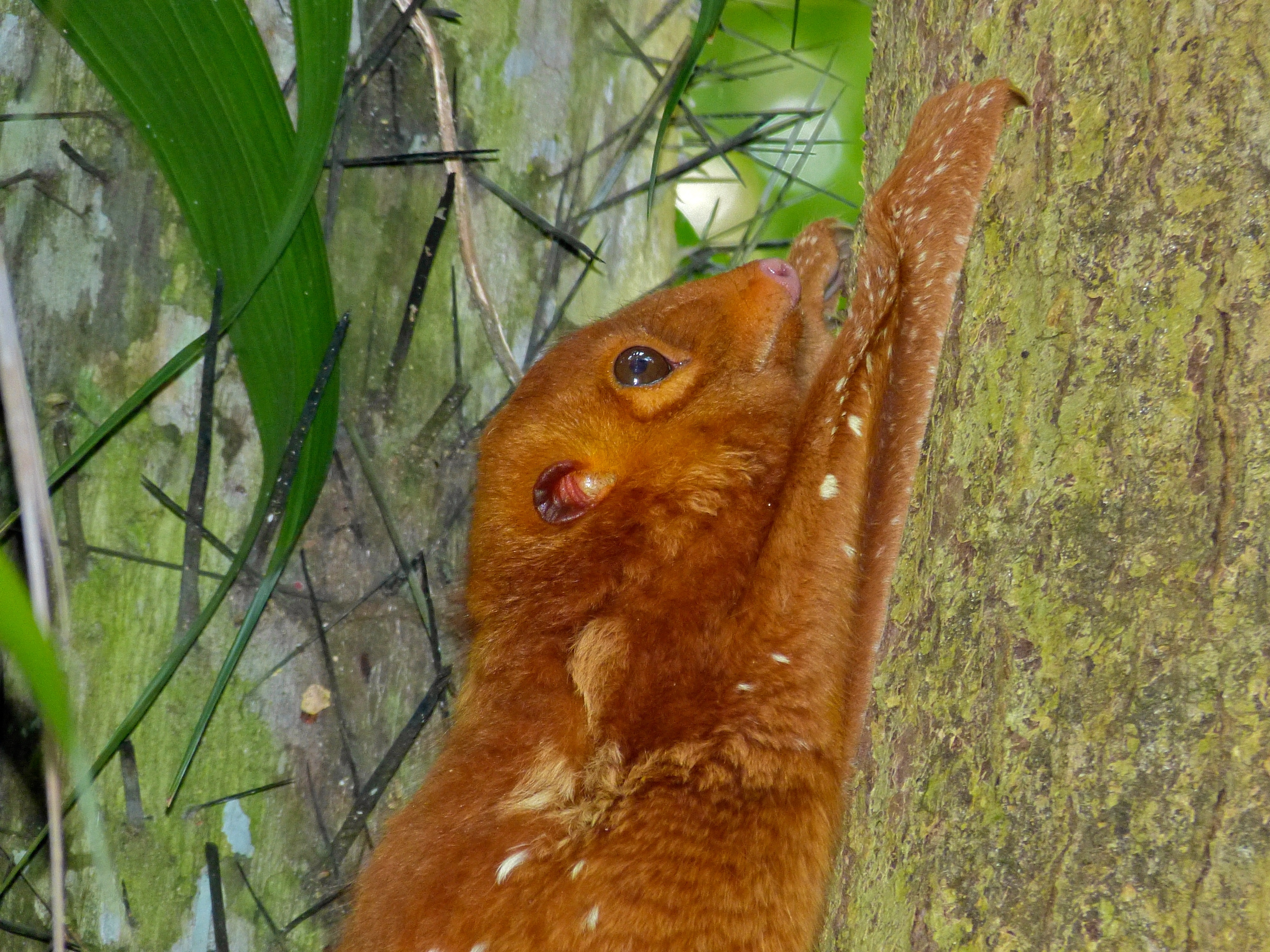
A "red" morph of a colugo (Cynocephalus variegatus)

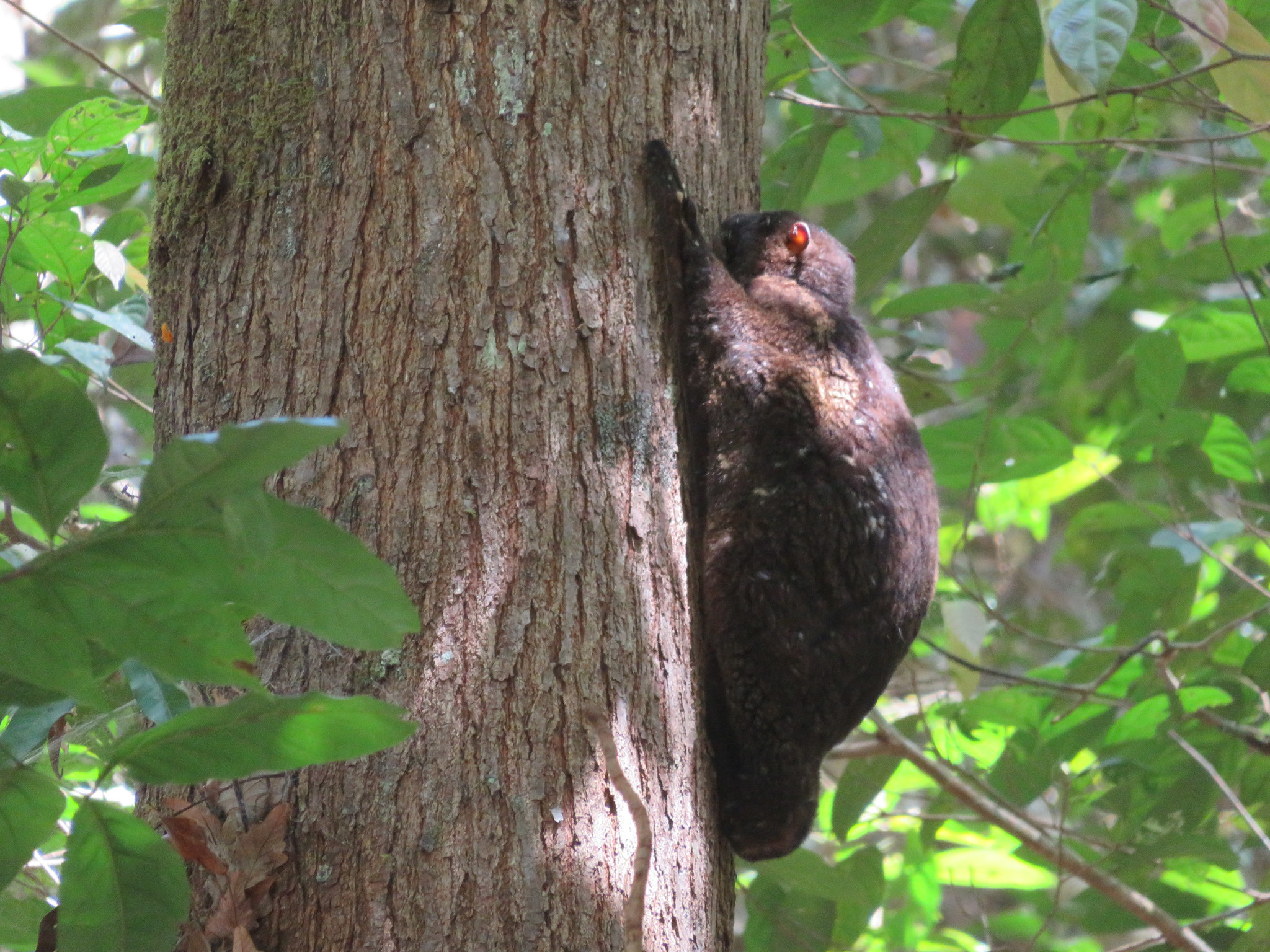
Black morph of a Sunda flying colugo (Cynocephalus variegatus)

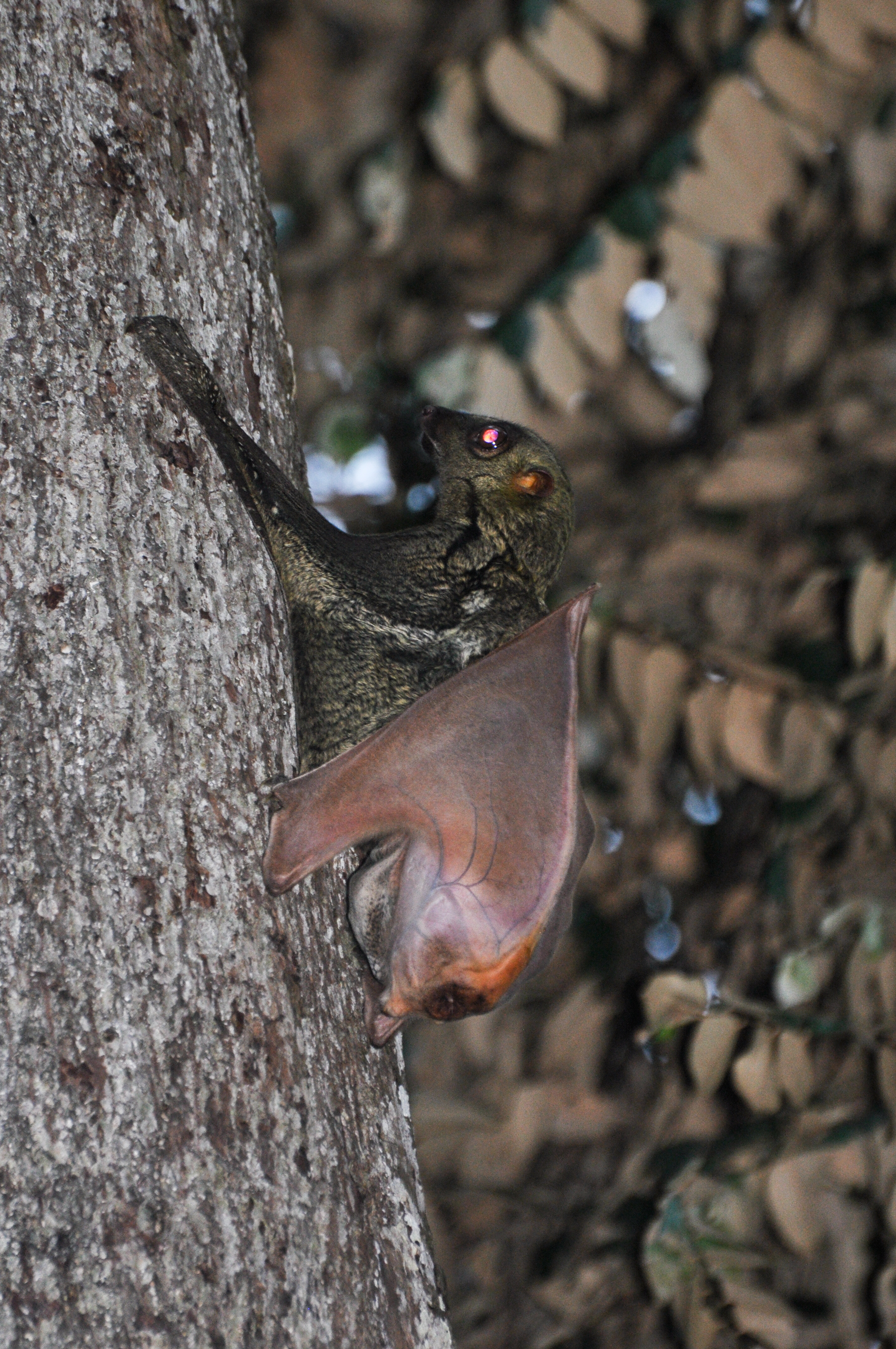
Colugo in a tree (Cynocephalus variegatus)
