= Retromolar space =

Anatomical space at the back of the jaw

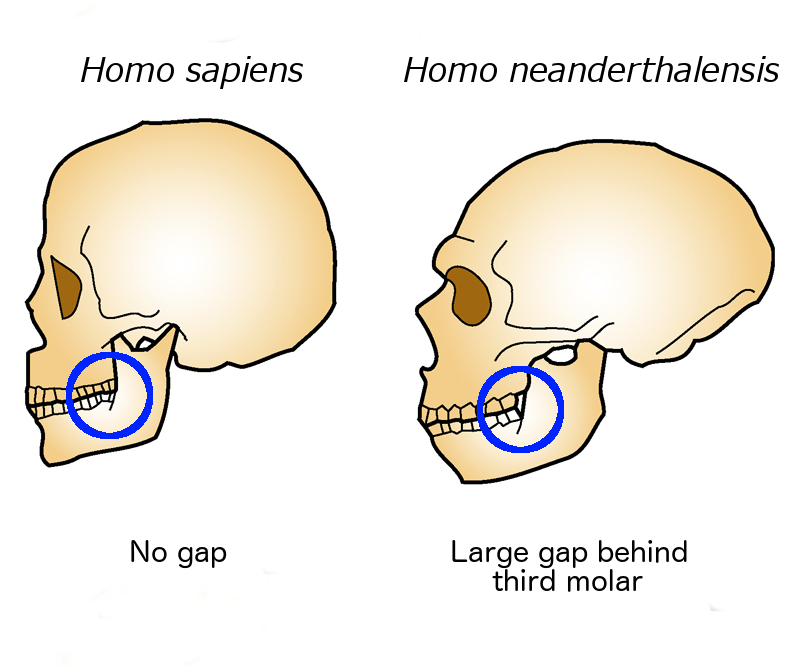

The retromolar space or retromolar gap is a space at the rear of the mandible, between the back of the last molar and the anterior edge of the ascending ramus where it crosses the alveolar margin.

This gap is generally small or absent in modern humans, but it was more often present in Neanderthals, and it was common among some prehistoric Amerindians, such as Arikara and Mandan.

== Retromolar pad ==
The retromolar area of a human mandible is covered by the retromolar pad (also known as the piriformis papilla), an elevated triangular area of mucosa. It is composed of non-keratinized loose alveolar tissue covering glandular tissues and muscle fibers. It is important for supporting lower complete and partial dentures as well as landmarking in the fabrication of dentures.
