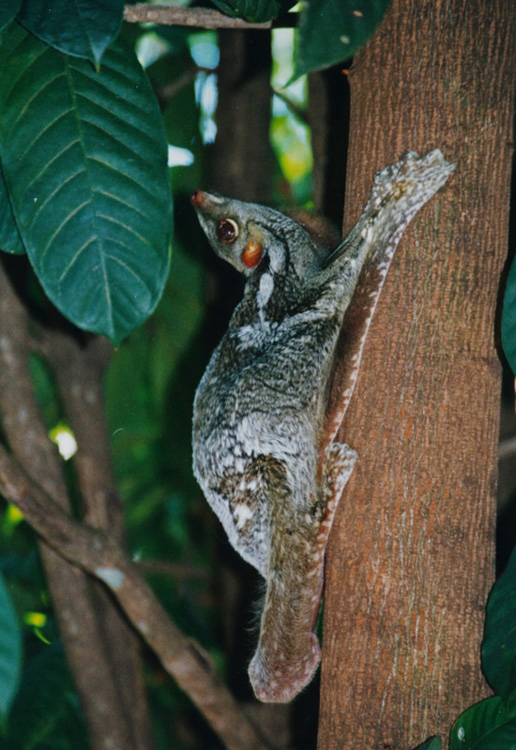
- Sunda flying lemur

Conservation status
- Least Concern (IUCN 3.1)

Scientific classification
- Kingdom: Animalia
- Phylum: Chordata
- Class: Mammalia
- Infraclass: Placentalia
- Order: Dermoptera
- Family: Cynocephalidae
- Genus: Galeopterus; Thomas, 1908
- Species: G. variegatus

Binomial name
- Galeopterus variegatus (Audebert, 1799)
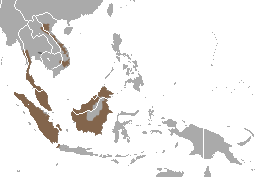
- Sunda flying lemur range

Synonyms
- Galeopithecus volans Pallas

= Sunda flying lemur =

Species of mammal

The Sunda flying lemur (Galeopterus variegatus), also called Malayan flying lemur and Malayan colugo, is the sole colugo species of the genus Galeopterus. It is native to Southeast Asia from southern Myanmar, Thailand, southern Vietnam, Malaysia to Singapore and Indonesia and listed as Least Concern on the IUCN Red List. Although it is called "flying lemur", it cannot fly but glides among trees and is strictly arboreal. It is active at night, and feeds on soft plant parts such as young leaves, shoots, flowers, and fruits. It is a forest-dependent species.

The Sunda flying lemur is protected by national legislation. The Sunda flying lemurs are often hunted by local people with spears or other lethal equipment for various reasons such as food and fur. Habitat loss is known to occur intermittently, particularly in developing countries such as Malaysia.

== Taxonomy and evolution ==
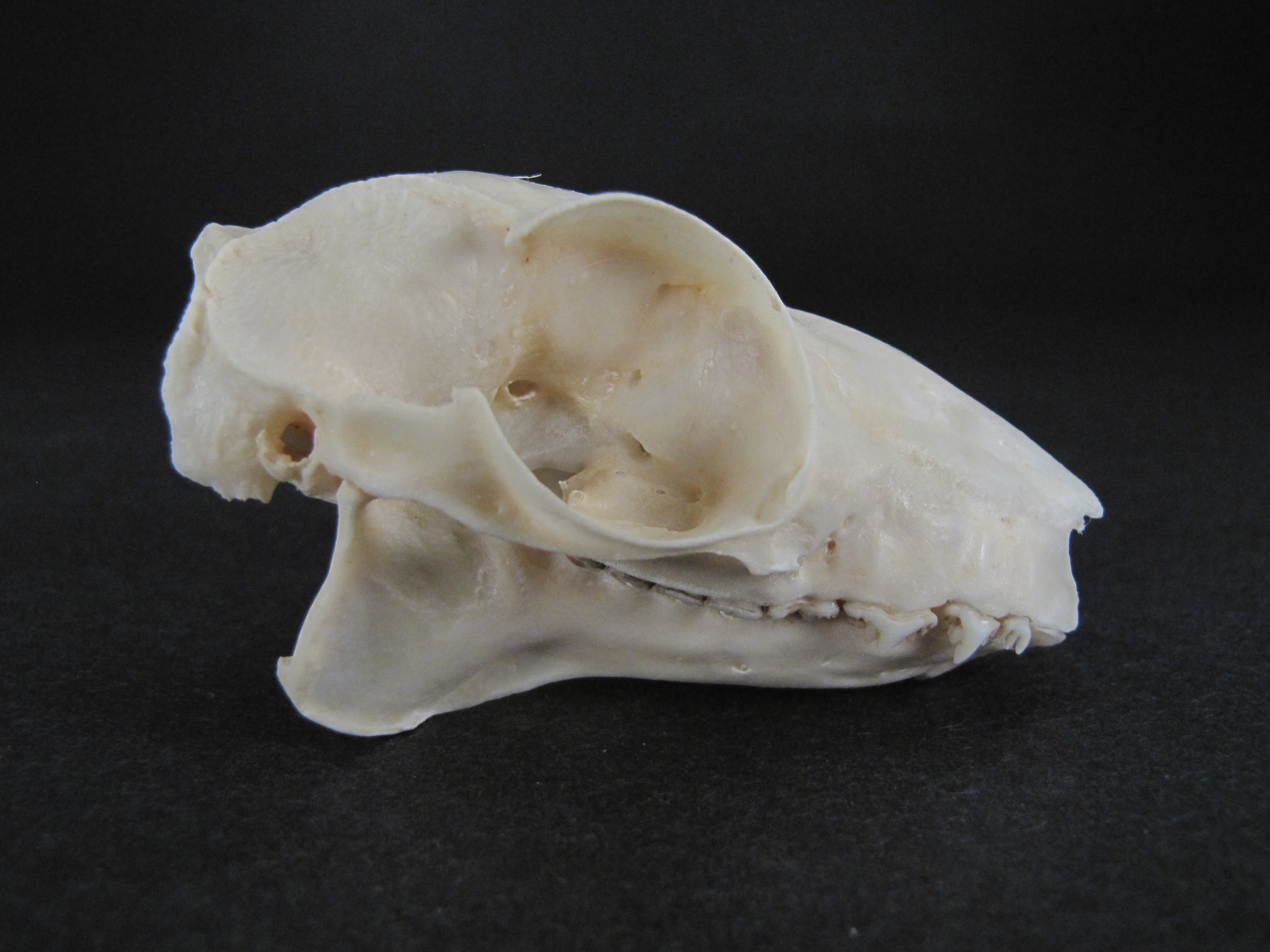
Skull

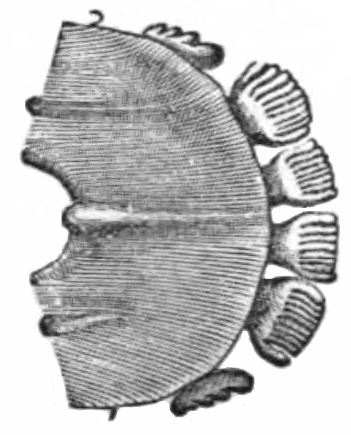
Jaw with teeth

The Sunda flying lemurs' two forms are not morphologically distinct from one another; the large form occurs on the mainland of the Sunda Shelf area and the mainland of Southeast Asia, while the dwarf form occurs in central Laos and some other adjacent islands. The Laos specimen is smaller (about 20%) than the other known mainland population.

Despite the large and dwarf forms, four subspecies are known: G. v. variegatus (Java), G. v. temminckii (Sumatra), G. v. borneanus (Borneo), and G. v. peninsulae (Peninsular Malaysia and mainland of Southeast Asia) incorporating on the genetic species concept due to geographic isolation and genetic divergence. Recent molecular and morphological data provide the evidence that the mainland, Javan, and Bornean Sunda flying lemur subspecies may be recognised as three separate species in the genus Galeopterus.

== Characteristics ==
The Sunda flying lemur is a skillful climber, but is nearly helpless when on the ground. Its gliding membrane connects from the neck, extending along the limbs to the tips of the fingers, toes, and nails. This kite-shaped skin is known as a patagium, which is expanded for gliding. It can glide over a distance of 100 m with a loss of fewer than 10 m in elevation. It has a dorsiflexed and abducted foot while having an abducted clawed grasp. This technique helps to climb trees easier and faster while looking for food or staying away from predators.

The head-body length of Sunda flying lemur is about 33 to 42 cm (13 to 17 in). Its tail length measures 18 to 27 cm (7.1 to 10.6 in), its hind legs measure between 6.5 to 7.3 cm (2.6 to 2.9 in) long. It weighs 0.9 to 1.3 kg (2.0 to 2.9 lb).

== Distribution and habitat ==
The Sunda flying lemur is widely distributed throughout Southeast Asia, ranging from the Sunda Shelf mainland to other islands – northern Laos, Cambodia, Vietnam, Thailand, Malaysia (Peninsular, Sabah and Sarawak), Singapore, Brunei, Indonesia (Kalimantan, Sumatra, Bali, Java), and many adjacent islands. Conversely, the Philippine flying lemur (C. volans) is confined to the southern parts of the Philippines only.

The Sunda flying lemur is adapted to many different vegetation types, including gardens, primary and secondary forest, rubber and coconut plantations, fruit orchards (dusun), mangrove swamps, lowlands and upland forests, tree plantations, lowland dipterocarp forests, and mountainous areas, but not all of these habitats can sustain large colugo populations.

== Behaviour and ecology ==
The Sunda flying lemur is nocturnal, but is sometimes active in the morning and in the afternoon. It can maneuver and navigate while gliding, but strong rain and wind can affect its ability to glide. Gliding usually occurs in open areas or high in the canopy, especially in dense tropical rainforest. It needs a certain distance to glide and to land to avoid injury. The highest landing forces are experienced after short glides; longer glides lead to softer landings, due to its ability to brake its glide aerodynamically. The ability to glide increases a colugo's access to scattered food resources in the rainforest, without increasing exposure to terrestrial or arboreal predators.

The Sunda flying lemur mainly forages in tree canopies on several different tree species in a single night, or on a single species.

=== Diet ===
In general, its diet consists mainly of leaves; it usually consumes leaves with less potassium and nitrogen-containing compounds, but with higher tannin. It also feeds on buds, shoots, flowers of coconut and durian trees fruits and sap from selected tree species. It also feeds on insects in Sarawak, Malaysian Borneo. The selected food sources depend on the localities, habitat, vegetation types, and availability.

It has been observed to lick tree bark of selected tree species to obtain water, nutrients, salts, and minerals.

=== Reproduction ===
After a 60-day gestation period, a single offspring is carried on the mother's abdomen held by a large skin membrane.
