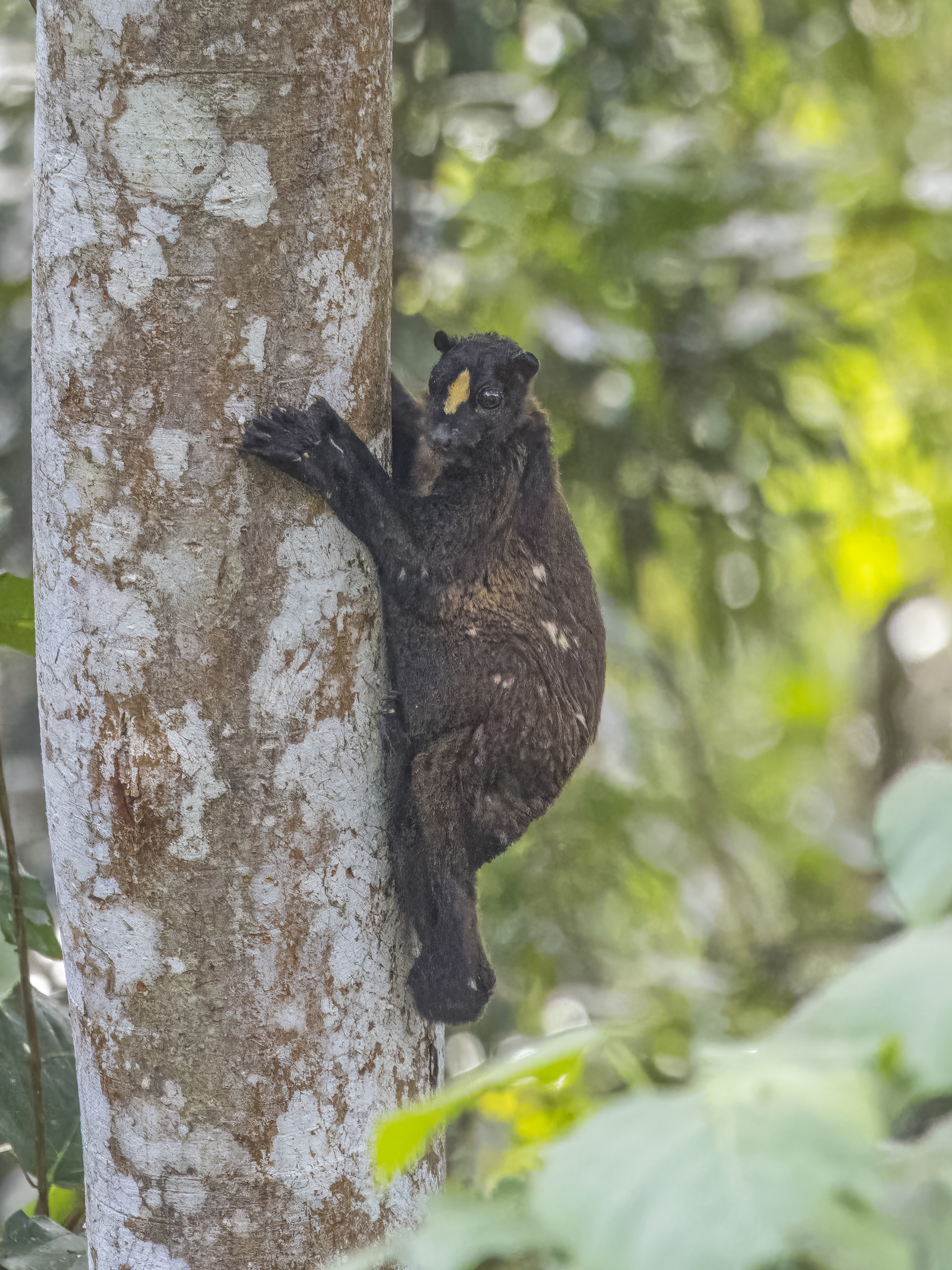
- On Bohol

Conservation status
- Least Concern (IUCN 3.1)

Scientific classification
- Kingdom: Animalia
- Phylum: Chordata
- Class: Mammalia
- Order: Dermoptera
- Family: Cynocephalidae
- Genus: Cynocephalus; Boddaert, 1768
- Species: C. volans

Binomial name
- Cynocephalus volans (Linnaeus, 1758)
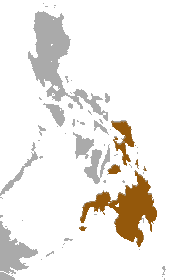
- Philippine flying lemur range

Synonyms
- Genus-level synonyms: Colugo; Dermopterus; Galeolemur; Galeopithecus; Galeopus; Pleuropterus; Species-level synonyms: Lemur volans Linnaeus, 1758

= Philippine flying lemur =

Species of mammal

The Philippine flying lemur or Philippine colugo (Cynocephalus volans), known locally as the kagwang, is one of two species of colugo. It is the only species in its genus. Despite their colloquial name, flying lemurs are not lemurs, nor are they capable of true powered flight, as they can only glide between trees.

The kagwang belongs to the order Dermoptera, which contains only one other species, the Sunda flying lemur, found in Indonesia, Thailand, Malaysia, and Singapore. Recent genetic analysis suggests two other species, the Bornean flying lemur and the Javan flying lemur, may be separate from the other species, but they have yet to be officially classified.

Both species of Dermoptera are classified under the grandorder Euarchonta, which includes treeshrews and primates, as well as an extinct order of mammals, the Plesiadapiformes.

== Taxonomy ==
The genus name Cynocephalus comes from the Ancient Greek κύων (kúon), meaning "dog", and κεφαλή (kephalḗ), meaning "head", because their heads are broad with short snouts like dogs.

== Habitat and ecology ==
The Philippine flying lemur is endemic to the southern Philippines. Its population is concentrated in the Mindanao region and Bohol. It may also be found in Samar and Leyte.

Colugos are found in heavily forested areas, living mainly high up in the trees in lowland and mountainous forests or sometimes in coconut and rubber plantations, rarely coming down to the ground. They spend most of their time at the top of the rainforest canopy or in the forest middle level. With their wide patagia and unopposable thumbs, Philippine flying lemurs are rather slow, clumsy climbers, ascending tree trunks in a series of slow lurches with their heads up and limbs spread to grasp the tree.

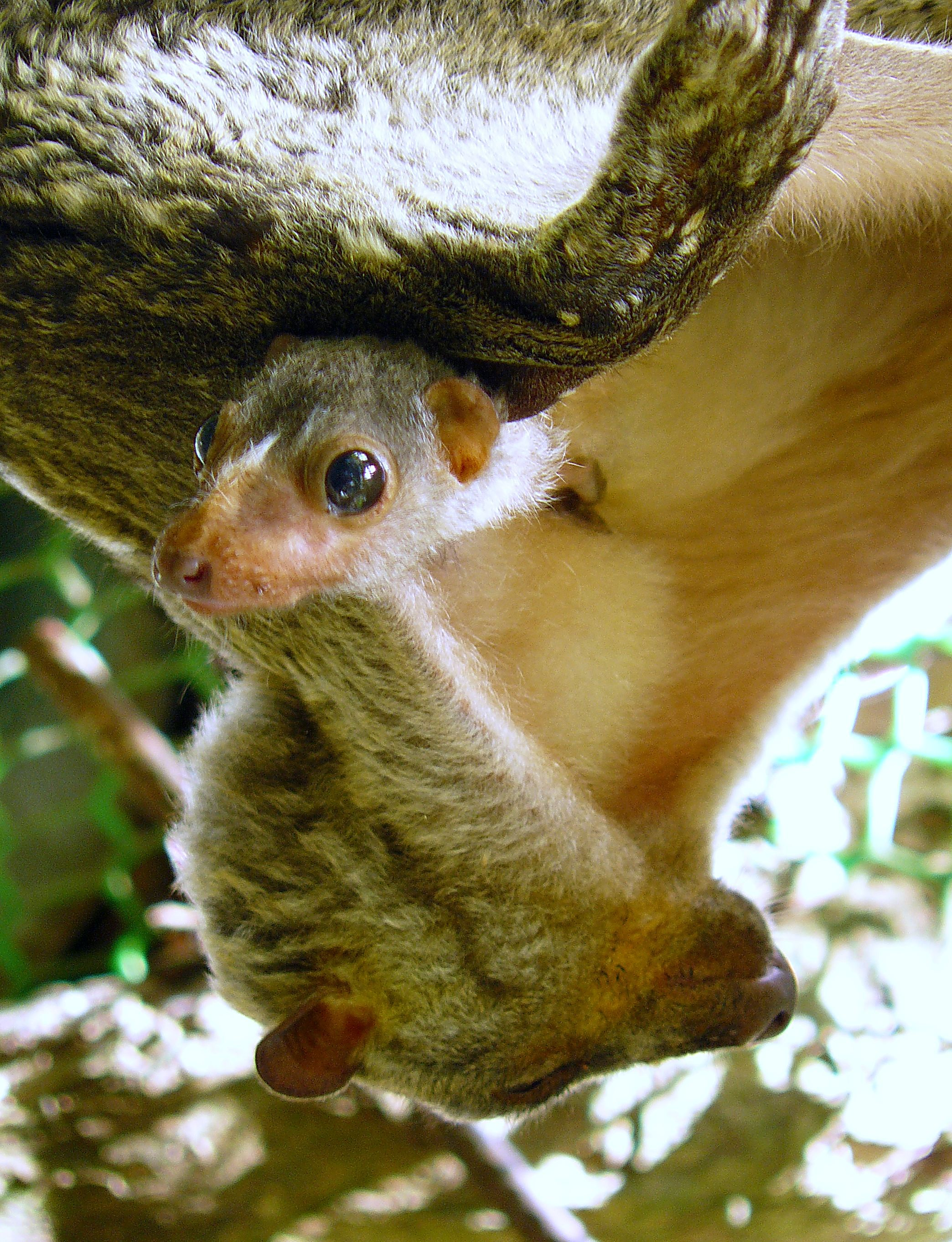
mother with baby

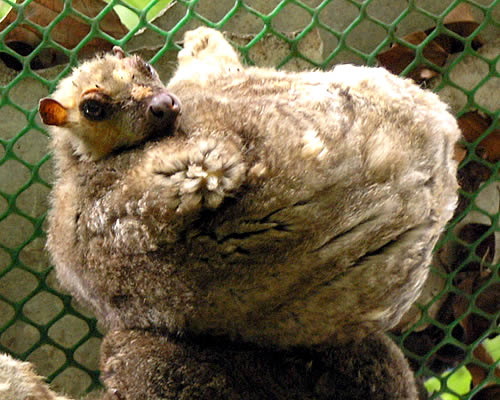
in captivity

== Physical features ==
A typical Philippine flying lemur weighs about 1.0 to 1.7 kg (2.2 to 3.7 lb) and its head-body length is 33–38 cm (13–15 in). Its tail length is 17–27 cm (6.5–10.5 in). The species exhibits sexual dimorphism with females being somewhat larger than males. It has a wide head and rostrum with a robust mandible for increased bite strength, small ears, and big eyes with unique photoreceptor adaptations adapted for its nocturnal lifestyle. The large eyes allow for excellent vision, which the colugo uses to accurately jump and glide from tree to tree. The colugo retina is avascular, which is a primitive trait amongst mammals, but one that may have secondarily evolved amongst colugos given that treeshrew and primate retinas are vascularized. On par with other nocturnal mammals, specifically nocturnal primates, the rod cells in the eye make up about 95–99% of the photoreceptors and cones make up about 1–5%.

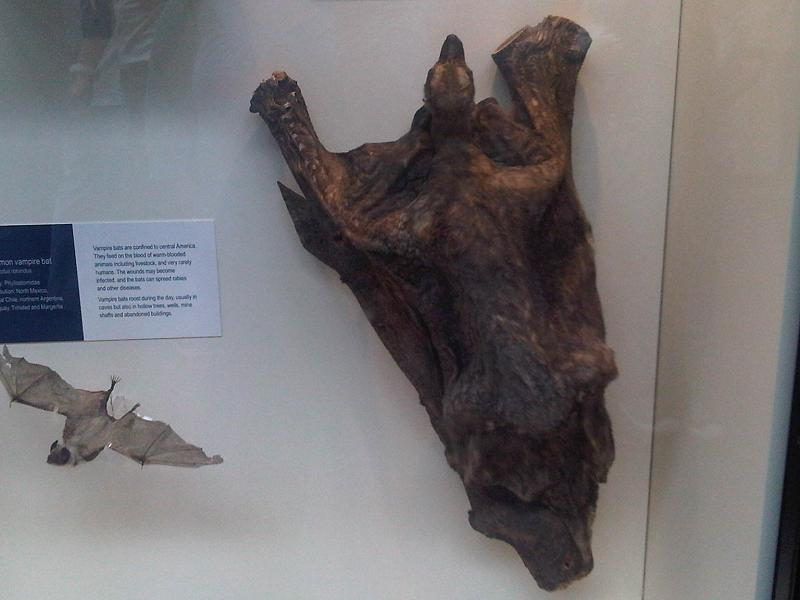
Patagium seen on museum specimen

Its clawed feet are large and sharp with an incredible grip strength, allowing them to skillfully but slowly climb trees, hang from branches, or anchor themselves to the trunk of a tree. One unique feature of the colugo is the patagium, the weblike membrane that connects its limbs to allow for gliding. Unlike other mammals with patagia, its patagium extends from the neck to the limbs, in between digits, and even behind the hind limbs and the tail. Its keeled sternum, which is also seen in bats, aids in its gliding efficiency. Its patagium is the most extensive membrane used for gliding in mammals and also functions as a hammock-like pouch for its young. This membrane helps it glide distances of 100 m or more, useful for finding food and escaping predators, such as the Philippine eagle (Pithecophaga jefferyi) and tree-climbing snakes that try to attack the colugos when they glide between trees.

The dental formula of the Philippine flying lemur is 2/3, 1/1, 2/2, 3/3, with a total of 34 teeth. The first two lower procumbent incisors are pectinate with up to 15 tines, which are thought to be used for grooming and grating food. The upper incisors are small and have spaces between them, as well. The deciduous teeth are serrated until they are lost and then they are replaced with blade-like teeth that have evolved to shear along with the molars that also have long shearing crests to help break down the plant matter they ingest. Following mastication, the digestive tract of the Philippine flying lemur, especially the stomach, is specially adapted to break down and process the large amount of leaves and vegetation they ingest. Colugos also have a brownish grey-and-white pelage they use as camouflage amongst the tree trunks and branches, which allows them to better hide from predators and hunters.

== Diet ==
The Philippine flying lemur is a folivore, eating mainly young leaves and occasionally soft fruits, flowers, plant shoots, and insects. They also obtain a significant amount of their water from licking wet leaves and from the water in the plants and fruits themselves. Most of their nutrition is obtained by jumping and gliding between trees high in the canopy; rarely do they eat on the forest floor.

== Behaviour ==
The Philippine flying lemur is arboreal and nocturnal, and usually resides in primary and secondary forests, but some wander into coconut, banana, and rubber plantations as deforestation for farming and industry is an increasingly prevalent problem. The colugo sleeps in hollow trees or clings onto branches in dense foliage during daytime. When they engage in this hanging behaviour from branches, they keep their heads upright, unlike bats.

On the ground, colugos are slow and clumsy, and not able to stand erect, so they rarely leave the canopy level of the forest, where they glide from tree to tree to get to food or their nests, which are also high in the trees. In the trees, though, colugos are quite effective climbers, though they are slow; they move in a series of lingering hops as they use their claws to move up the tree trunk. Foraging only at night, colugos on average forage for 9.4 minutes about 12 times per night. They typically leave their nests at dusk to begin their foraging activity. When foraging, returning to the nest, or just moving around, the Philippine flying lemur uses its patagium to glide from tree to tree. The patagium is also used for cloaking the colugo when it is clinging to a tree trunk or branch, and sometimes it is even seen curled up in a ball, using its patagium again as a cloaking mechanism among palm fronds often in coconut plantations.

Colugos maintain height in the trees to avoid predators that may live in lower levels, but they are still susceptible to other predators that can reach these higher levels of the canopy and predatory birds that can attack from above. They live alone, but several may be seen in the same tree, where they maintain their distance from one another and are very territorial of their personal areas. Though they are not social mammals, they do engage in a unique semi-social behaviour where colugos living in the same relative area or tree follow each other's gliding paths through the trees in search of food. This may be a defence mechanism, whereas a population, the safest route possible is determined and shared as a sort of cooperative mechanism for increased survival rates. The only time colugos actually live socially is after a mother has given birth; then she will care for and live with her offspring until they are weaned; at that point, the offspring are on their own. The average lifespan of the Philippine flying lemur is unknown.

== Reproduction ==
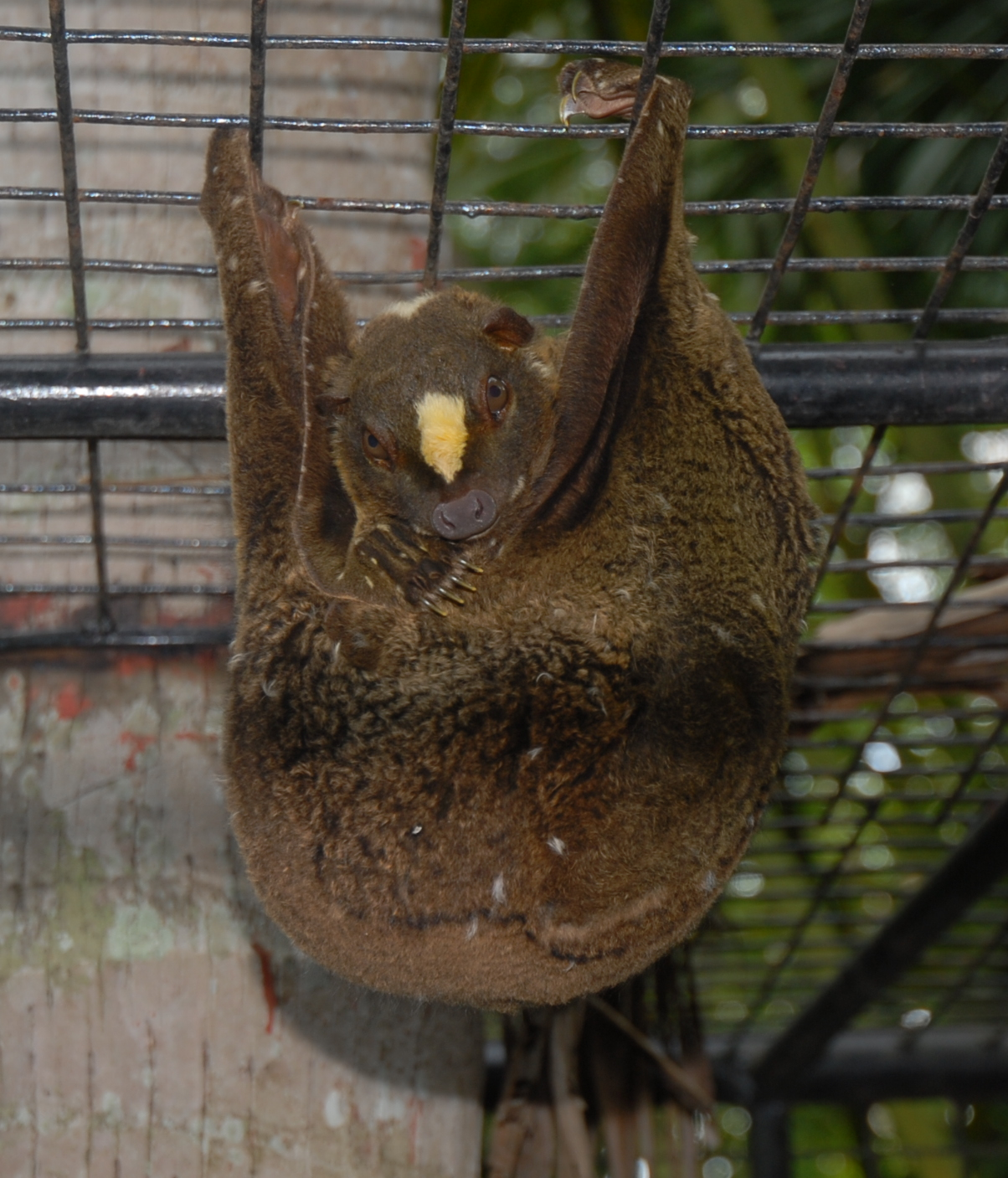
Mother with infant

Little is known about the reproductive behaviour in colugos. The female usually gives birth to one young after a two-month gestation period. The young is born undeveloped and helpless, and it attaches itself to its mother's belly, in a pouch formed from the mother's tail membrane. It is eventually weaned around 6 months old, and leaves its mother's patagium. Adult size and sexual maturity is reached between two and three years of age. Mating usually occurs between January and March.

== Major threats ==
The Philippine flying lemur is threatened by massive destruction of its forest habitat, owing partly to logging and the development of land for agriculture.

It is a primary prey of the Philippine eagle making up to 90% of the eagle's diet. It is also hunted by humans for food.

== Conservation ==
The IUCN 1996 had declared the species vulnerable owing to the destruction of lowland forests and to hunting, but it was listed as least concern in 2008. The 2008 IUCN report indicates the species persists in the face of degraded habitat, with its current population large enough to avoid the threatened category. Since colugos have limited dispersal abilities, they are increasingly vulnerable as deforestation is occurring at increasing rates. Other threats to the species include hunting by the farmers of the plantations they sometimes invade, where they are considered pests, since they eat fruits and flowers. In local cultures, their flesh is also consumed as a delicacy; other uses of the colugo vary in different regions of the Philippines. In Bohol, their fur is used as material for native hats, but in Samar, the species is considered a bad omen and is killed either to be used as a warning or to get rid of the omen. The animal is largely unknown in many areas in the Philippines such that on Facebook, its image was once mistaken for a supernatural creature that was said to feed on other animals, though in reality, the endangered species is a folivore that feeds on fruits, flowers, and leaves.
