= Denver Formation =

Geological formation in Colorado, U.S.

Coordinates: 39.74°N 104.98°W

- Stratigraphic range: Late Maastrichtian to Danian
- Type: Geological formation
- Unit of: D1 Sequence
- Underlies: Dawson Arkose
- Overlies: Arapahoe Formation
- Thickness: up to 1,580 ft (480 m)

Lithology
- Primary: Claystone, siltstone, sandstone
- Other: Conglomerate, tuff, coal, lava

Location
- Region: Colorado
- Country: United States

Type section
- Named for: Denver, Colorado
- Named by: Emmons, Cross and Eldridge (1896)

The Denver Formation is a geological formation that is present within the central part of the Denver Basin that underlies the Denver, Colorado, area. It ranges in age from latest Cretaceous (Maastrichtian) to early Paleocene (Danian), and includes sediments that were deposited before, during and after the Cretaceous-Paleogene boundary event.

The formation is known for its paleontological resources, including dinosaur remains that are found in the Late Cretaceous part of the formation, and it includes aquifers that are important sources of water for the area. Some of North America's most iconic end-Cretaceous dinosaurs, such as Triceratops and Tyrannosaurus, were first identified from the Denver Formation before being properly described from better-preserved remains in end-Cretaceous formations further north. The formation also preserves one of the most world's most diverse earliest Paleocene mammalian faunas, providing an important record of the diversification of mammals in the immediate aftermath of the K-Pg extinction.

== Stratigraphy ==
The Denver Formation rests on the Arapahoe Formation, and its base is marked by the first appearance of tuffaceous sediments. It is overlain by the Dawson Arkose.

In 2002 the Denver Formation was included as part of a larger unconformity-bounded unit named the D1 sequence, in order to facilitate basin-wide studies and avoid confusion arising from the lateral and vertical facies changes that occur within the Denver Basin. The base of the D1 is marked by the abrupt facies change at the top of the Laramie Formation, and its top is placed at the base of a regional paleosol series. The Arapahoe Formation and the Dawson Arkose are also included in the D1 Sequence.

== Thickness and lithology ==
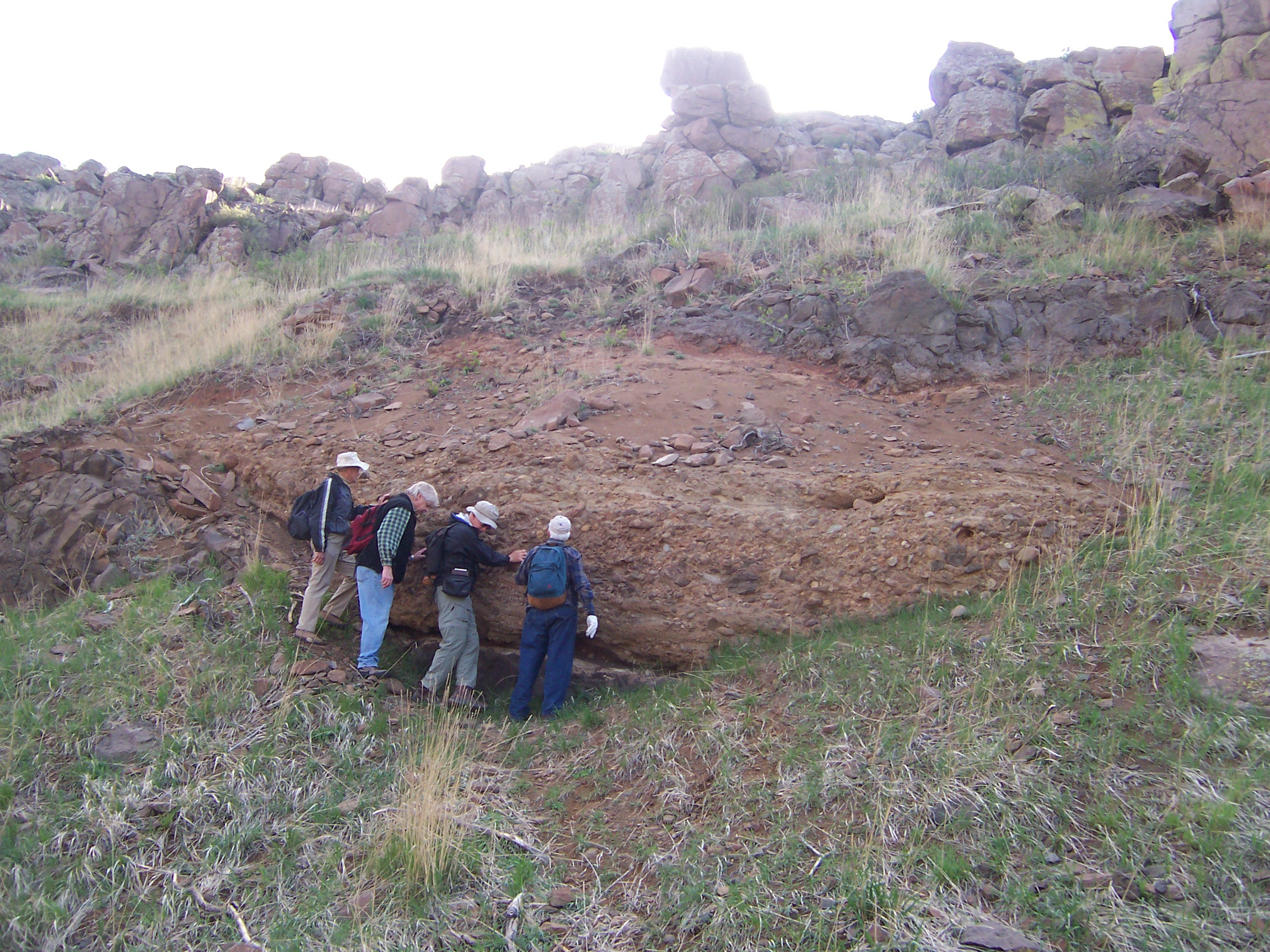
Geologists examining an ancient stream bed deposit in the Denver Formation, exposed below the lava flows on the western slopes of North Table Mountain.

The Denver Formation consists of alluvial fan, fluvial, and paludal deposits that accumulated at the foot of the growing Rocky Mountain Front Ranges. It ranges in thickness from 600 feet (180 m) to 1,580 feet (480 m) in the central part of the Denver Basin. It is characterized by significant amounts of andesitic volcanic debris, and is composed of primarily of light-grey to brown, lenticular bedded, loosely cemented silty claystone, mudstone, siltstone, tuffaceous sandstone and, in some areas, andesitic conglomerate. Beds of low-rank coal and carbonaceous shale occur in the upper 500 feet (150 m) in some areas.

Several early Paleocene lava flows are present in the upper part of the Denver Formation at North and South Table Mountain near Golden, Colorado. The Ralston Dike, a body of intrusive monzonite located several miles to the northwest, probably represents the volcanic vent from which the flows erupted. Generally referred to as basaltic, they are classified either as monzonite (the lowest flow) and latite (the upper two flows), or as shoshonite. They contain the minerals augite, plagioclase, and olivine altered to serpentine, with accessory sanidine and/or orthoclase, apatite, magnetite, and biotite. One of the flows hosts a wide variety of zeolite minerals, including analcime, thomsonite, mesolite, chabazite, and others.

== Age and paleontology ==
The Denver Formation spans the Cretaceous-Paleogene boundary. The lava flows in the upper part of the formation are about 62 to 64 million years old according to radiometric dating, which places them in the early Paleocene Epoch. The Cretaceous-Paleogene boundary occurs in the lower part of the formation, and an exposure of the boundary layer has been identified and documented on South Table Mountain near the city of Golden.

Plant fossils and remains of vertebrates, including turtles and mammals, are found throughout the Denver Formation. Dinosaur remains are restricted to the lower, Late Cretaceous, part.

== Vertebrate paleofauna ==
Based on the Paleobiology Database except where noted:

=== Ray-finned fish ===
Ray-finned fish reported from the Denver Formation
Genus	Species	Location	Stratigraphic position	Material	Notes	Images
Lepisosteus	L. sp.		Danian		A gar.	

=== Amphibians ===
Amphibians reported from the Denver Formation
Genus	Species	Location	Stratigraphic position	Material	Notes	Images
Opisthotriton	O. kayi		Danian		A batrachosauroidid salamander.	
Scapherpetonidae indet.			Danian		A scapherpetonid salamander.	

=== Reptiles ===
==== Squamates ====
Squamates reported from the Denver Formation
Genus	Species	Location	Stratigraphic position	Material	Notes	Images
Anguidae indet.			Danian		An anguid lizard of uncertain affinities.	
aff. Contogenys	aff. C. sp.		Danian		A contogeniid lizard.	
cf. Odaxosaurus	cf. O. piger		Danian		An anguid lizard.	
Palaeoscincosaurus	P. middletoni		Danian		A contogeniid lizard, formerly considered an early skink. Type locality of genus and species.	

==== Turtles ====
Turtles reported from the Denver Formation
Genus	Species	Location	Stratigraphic position	Material	Notes	Images
Adocus	A. sp.		Maastrichtian to Danian		An adocid.	
Basilemys	B. sinuosa		Maastrichtian		A nanhsiungchelyid.	
Denverus	D. middletoni		Danian		A stem-snapping turtle. Type locality of genus and species.	
Helopanoplia	H. distincta		Maastrichtian		A plastomenid trionychian.	
Hoplochelys	H. crassa		Danian		A kinosternoid.	
Macrobaenidae indet.			Danian		A macrobaenid turtle of uncertain affinities.	
Palatobaena	P. knellerorum		Danian		A baenid. Type locality of species.	
Plastomenus	P. joycei		Danian	Nearly complete skeleton.	A plastomenid. Type locality of species.	
Tavachelydra	T. stevensoni		Danian	Nearly complete shells, pelvic material, and cranial material	A stem-snapping turtle. Type locality of genus and species.	
"Trionyx"	"T." singularis		Danian		A softshell turtle.	

==== Crocodylomorphs ====
Crocodylomorphs reported from the Denver Formation
Genus	Species	Location	Stratigraphic position	Material	Notes	Images
Mandrasuchus	M. milleri	Corral Bluffs	Danian		An alligatorine, type locality of genus and species.	
Borealosuchus	B. sternbergii		Danian		A eusuchian.	

==== Dinosaurs ====
The Denver Formation's dinosaur fauna appears to share close similarities with those of other Maastrichtian-aged formations in western North America. However, the dinosaur remains in the Denver Formation are significantly more disarticulated and fragmentary, suggesting that the formation's depositional environment was not conducive to the rapid burial that would have preserved articulated dinosaur skeletons.

This formation represents the first known discoveries to science of Triceratops (a partial cranium with horns) and Tyrannosaurus (a tooth), as well as the type locality for another well-known dinosaur, Ornithomimus.

===== Ornithischians =====
Ornithischians reported from the Denver Formation						
Genus	Species	Location	Stratigraphic position	Material	Notes	Images
Cionodon	C. arctatus		Maastrichtian	"Fragmentary maxilla, vertebrae, fragmentary postcranial elements."	Later found to be indeterminate hadrosaurid remains.	
?Edmontonia	?E. sp.		Maastrichtian		A nodosaurid ankylosaur.	
Edmontosaurus	E. sp.		Maastrichtian		A hadrosaurid.	
Pachycephalosaurus	P. sp.		Maastrichtian		A pachycephalosaur.	
Polyonax	P. mortuarius		Maastrichtian	"Horn fragments, vertebrae." (type specimen)	A dubious ceratopsian	
Triceratops	T. galeus		Maastrichtian	"Nasal horn core."	A dubious ceratopsian	
Triceratops	T. horridus (=Bison alticornis)		Maastrichtian		Type locality of the genus and the first known Triceratops specimen, initially identified as a species of bison.	

===== Saurischians =====
Saurischians of the Denver Formation
Genus	Species	Location	Stratigraphic position	Abundance	Notes	Images
Aublysodon	A. mirandus		Maastrichtian		Later found to be indeterminate tyrannosauroid remains.	
Dromaeosauridae indet.			Maastrichtian		A dromaeosaur of uncertain affinities. Some remains referred to "Dromaeosaurus".	
Ornithomimus	O. velox		Maastrichtian		An ornithomimosaur. Type locality of genus and species.	Ornithomimus
Tyrannosaurus	T. rex		Maastrichtian		A tyrannosaur. The very first T. rex fossil known was a tooth collected from this formation.	Tyrannosaurus

=== Mammals ===
==== Multituberculates ====
Multituberculates reported from the Denver Formation
Genus	Species	Location	Stratigraphic position	Material	Notes	Images
Catopsalis	C. alexanderi		Danian		A taeniolabidid.	
Cimexomys	C. arapahoensis		Danian		A "Paracimexomys-group" multituberculate.	
Cimexomys	C. minor		Danian		A "Paracimexomys-group" multituberculate.	
Kimbetohia	K. mziae		Danian		A ptilodontid.	
Mesodma	M. ambigua		Danian		A neoplagiaulacid.	
Mesodma	M. hensleighi		Danian			
Taeniolabis	T. taoensis	Corral Bluffs	Danian	Complete cranium and partial crania and dentary.	A taeniolabidid.	
Xyronomys	X. robinsoni		Danian		A neoplagiaulacid.	

==== Metatherians ====
Metatherians reported from the Denver Formation
Genus	Species	Location	Stratigraphic position	Material	Notes	Images
Thylacodon	T. montanensis		Danian		A herpetotheriid.	
Thylacodon	T. pusillus		Danian		A herpetotheriid.	

==== Cimolestans ====
Cimolestans reported from the Denver Formation
Genus	Species	Location	Stratigraphic position	Material	Notes	Images
Procerberus	P. andesiticus		Danian		A cimolestid.	
Procerberus	P. grandis		Danian		A cimolestid.	

==== Placentals ====
Former "condylarths".

Placentals reported from the Denver Formation
Genus	Species	Location	Stratigraphic position	Material	Notes	Images
Alticonus	A. gazini		Danian		A periptychid paraxonian. Type locality of genus and species.	
Auraria	A. urbana		Danian		A periptychid paraxonian. Type locality of genus and species.	
Ampliconus	A. browni		Danian		A periptychid paraxonian. Type locality of genus and species.	
Baioconodon	B. denverensis		Danian		An arctocyonid paraxonian.	
Baioconodon	B. nordicus		Danian		An arctocyonid paraxonian.	
Conacodon	C. delphae		Danian		A periptychid paraxonian.	
Conacodon	C. harbourae		Danian		A periptychid paraxonian.	
Conacodon	C. matthewi		Danian		A periptychid paraxonian.	
Desmatoclaenus	D. protogonioides		Danian		An arctocyonid paraxonian.	
Ectoconus	E. ditrigonus		Danian		A periptychid paraxonian.	
Haploconus	H. entoconus		Danian		A periptychid paraxonian.	
Loxolophus	L. hyattianus		Danian		An arctocyonid paraxonian.	
Maiorana	M. sp.		Danian		An arctocyonid paraxonian.	
Militocodon	M. lydae	Corral Bluffs	Danian	Cranium	A periptychid paraxonian. Type locality of genus and species.	
Miniconus	M. archibaldi		Danian		A periptychid paraxonian.	
Mioclaenidae indet.			Danian		A mioclaenid.	
Oxyclaenus	O. cuspidatus		Danian		An arctocyonid paraxonian.	
Oxyclaenus	O. subbituminus		Danian		An arctocyonid paraxonian.	
Oxyprimus	O. galadrielae		Danian		An arctocyonid paraxonian.	
Periptychus	P. coarctatus		Danian		A periptychid paraxonian.	
Protungulatum	P. donnae		Danian		A protungulatid euungulate.	

== See also ==
- List of dinosaur-bearing rock formations
- Fort Union Formation
