= North Table Mountain =

Landform in Colorado, United States

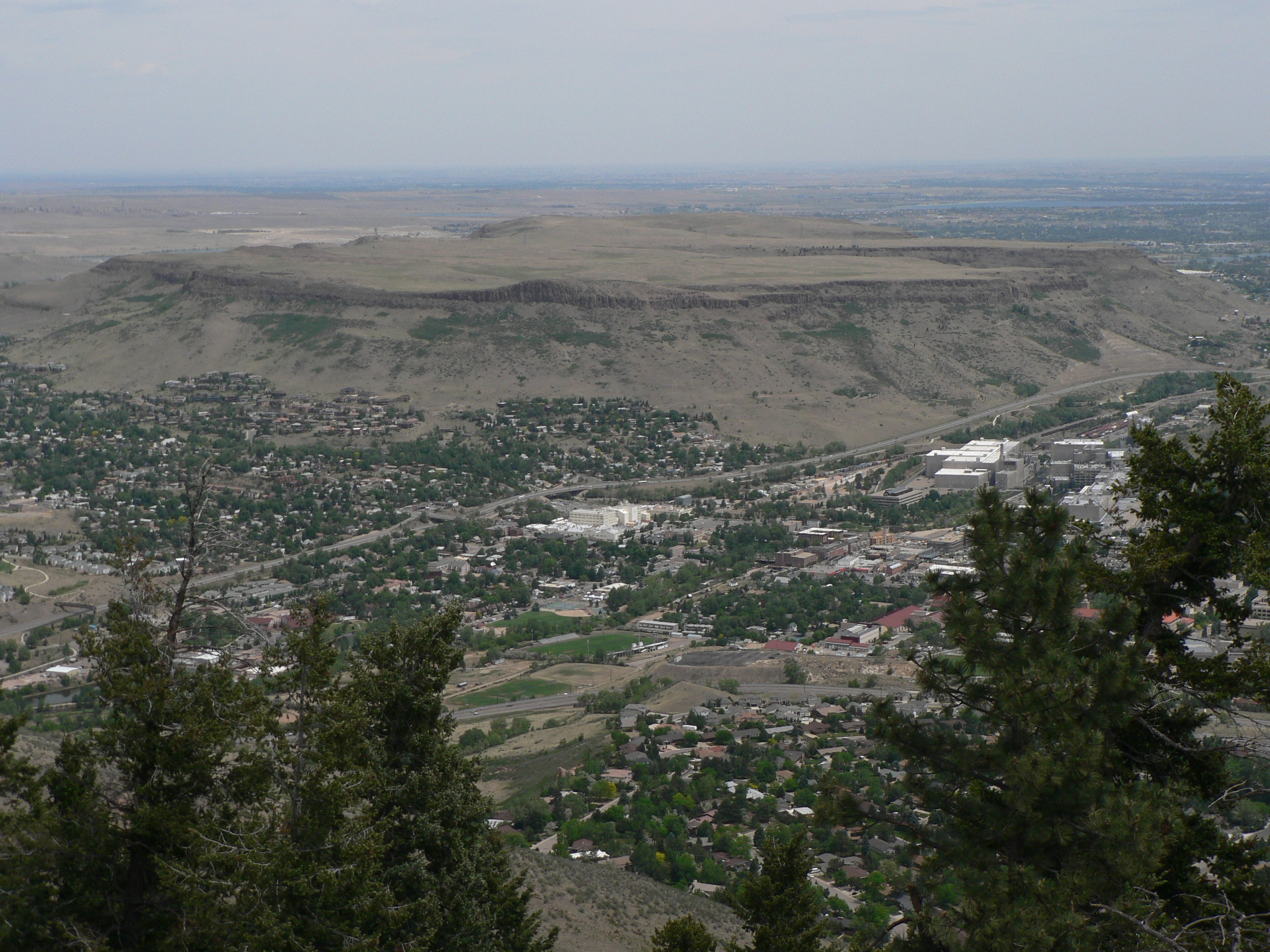
- View looking northeast from the top of Lookout Mountain.

Highest point
- Elevation: 6,555 ft (1,998 m)
- Isolation: 2.18 mi (3.51 km)
- Coordinates: 39°47′30″N 105°12′03″W

Geography
- Location within Colorado
- Location: Jefferson County, Colorado, U.S.
- Parent range: Front Range foothills
- Topo map(s): USGS 7.5' topographic map Golden, Colorado

Geology
- Mountain type: Mesa

Climbing
- First ascent: 1840s by Black Kettle and tribe
- Easiest route: Quarry road up west slope

North Table Mountain is a mesa on the eastern flank of the Front Range of the Rocky Mountains of North America. The 6,555-foot (1,998 m) mesa summit is located in North Table Mountain Park, 3.4 miles (5.5 km) north by east (bearing 9°) of downtown Golden, Colorado, United States, in Jefferson County.

== Mesa ==
The most distinctive feature of the mesa is its nearly flat cap that was formed by ancient Paleocene lava flows. It is separated from companion South Table Mountain, which consists of the same geologic formation, by Clear Creek.

North Table Mountain is a popular scenic and recreational destination in the Denver metro area, and it is preserved as public open space by Jefferson County and the Access Fund. Recent and ongoing projects by Jefferson County Open Space have resulted in the construction of several new trails and eliminated large numbers of unofficial trails.

== Geology ==
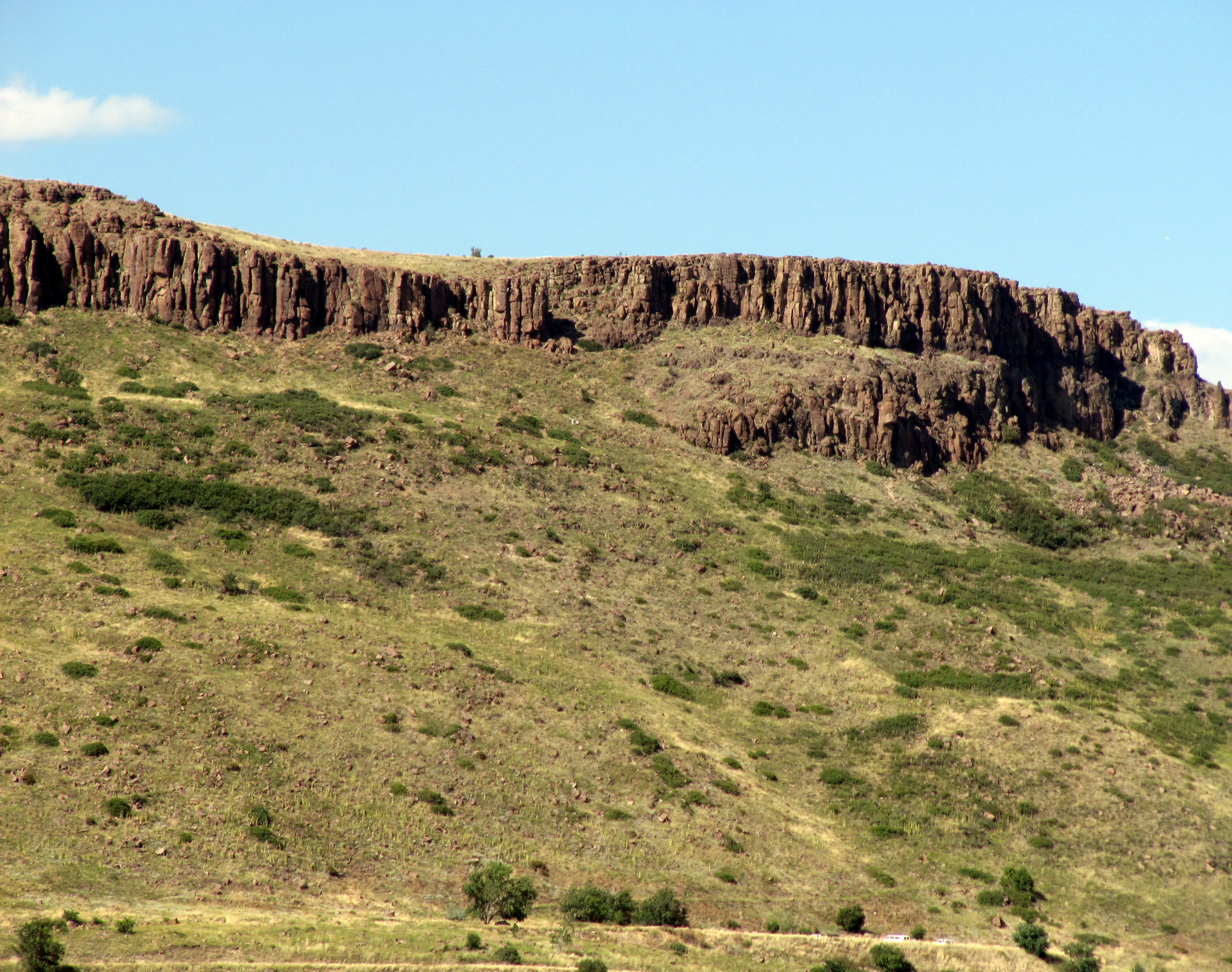
Two early Paleocene lava flows cap North Table Mountain.

North Table Mountain is underlain by sedimentary rocks of the Denver Formation, which spans the interval from latest Cretaceous to early Paleocene time. An exposure of the Cretaceous-Paleogene boundary layer has been identified and documented on nearby South Table Mountain.

Three prominent, columnar jointed, cliff-forming lava flows can be seen on North Table Mountain, one exposed part way up the northwest slope, and two that form its cap. The Ralston Dike, a body of intrusive monzonite located about 2 miles (3.2 km) to the northwest, probably represents the volcanic vent from which the flows erupted. The flows are about 62 to 64 million years old according to radiometric dating, which places them in the early Paleocene epoch. Generally referred to as basaltic, they are classified either as monzonite (the lowest flow) and latite (the upper two flows), or as shoshonite. They contain the minerals augite, plagioclase, and olivine altered to serpentine, with accessory sanidine, orthoclase, apatite, magnetite, and biotite.

=== Zeolite ===
Both North and South Table Mountain are known for the wide variety of zeolite minerals that occur in vesicles in the second flow. These include analcime, thomsonite, mesolite, chabazite, and others. Excellent specimens of the Table Mountain zeolites can be seen at the nearby Mines Museum of Earth Science.

== Wildlife ==
Among the animals known to frequent the mesa through time, according to local newspaper accounts, are mountain sheep, coyotes, mountain lions, plenty of deer, elk, rattlesnakes, and more. Of these, most except for the mountain sheep continue to live upon the mountain today. Several areas are closed seasonally to protect several species of nesting raptors. In the late 19th century bees also nested in the cliffs.

== Burial Site ==
On September 1, 1909 quarry workers discovered and unearthed a human skull and bones at the Doane-Westcott quarry, located approximately midway up the western slope where the vertical lines of its aerial tramway intersect the bench land today. The Golden Transcript described "The ghastly relics of a tragedy many years ago had been buried under at least forty feet of earth and rocks" during excavation for the tramway. Upon examination by Jefferson County, Colorado Coroner John Lofton Davidson and Dr. James Kelly they pronounced the remains to be an adult caucasian male with cause of death by modern terms an execution-style homicide. The newspaper described "One side of the skull is dented and crushed, showing that death was caused by a blow from a stone or some heavy instrument. It was found at least three hundred feet from the base of the cliffs, showing that the man could not have fallen from the top." Coroner Davidson concluded that death preceded settlement of the region and theorized it was the remains of one of the early fur trappers, killed by Indians who wedged the body between two rocks that was subsequently covered by rockfall from above. The remains are potentially related to the killings of three other mountaineers by a small band of Cheyenne that took place in what is today southern Jefferson County west of the South Platte River in 1842.

== Fire ==
On July 22, 2005, more than 200 acres (81 hectares) were set ablaze. Two fifteen-year-old boys were charged with first-degree felony arson and misdemeanor fourth-degree arson for lighting fireworks. They claimed to have shot off a Roman Candle, which started several small spot fires at the base of the north face. They fled the scene, but an area resident had witnessed the act and reported them to the police after the fire escalated, and they were soon found. The fire was contained later the same day, but it was summer with dry prairie grass conditions, so the fire had spread rapidly. It only burned one structure, a toolshed, and some other small miscellaneous pieces of property, but it cost more than 100,000 dollars (U.S. currency) to contain and extinguish.

== Pictures ==
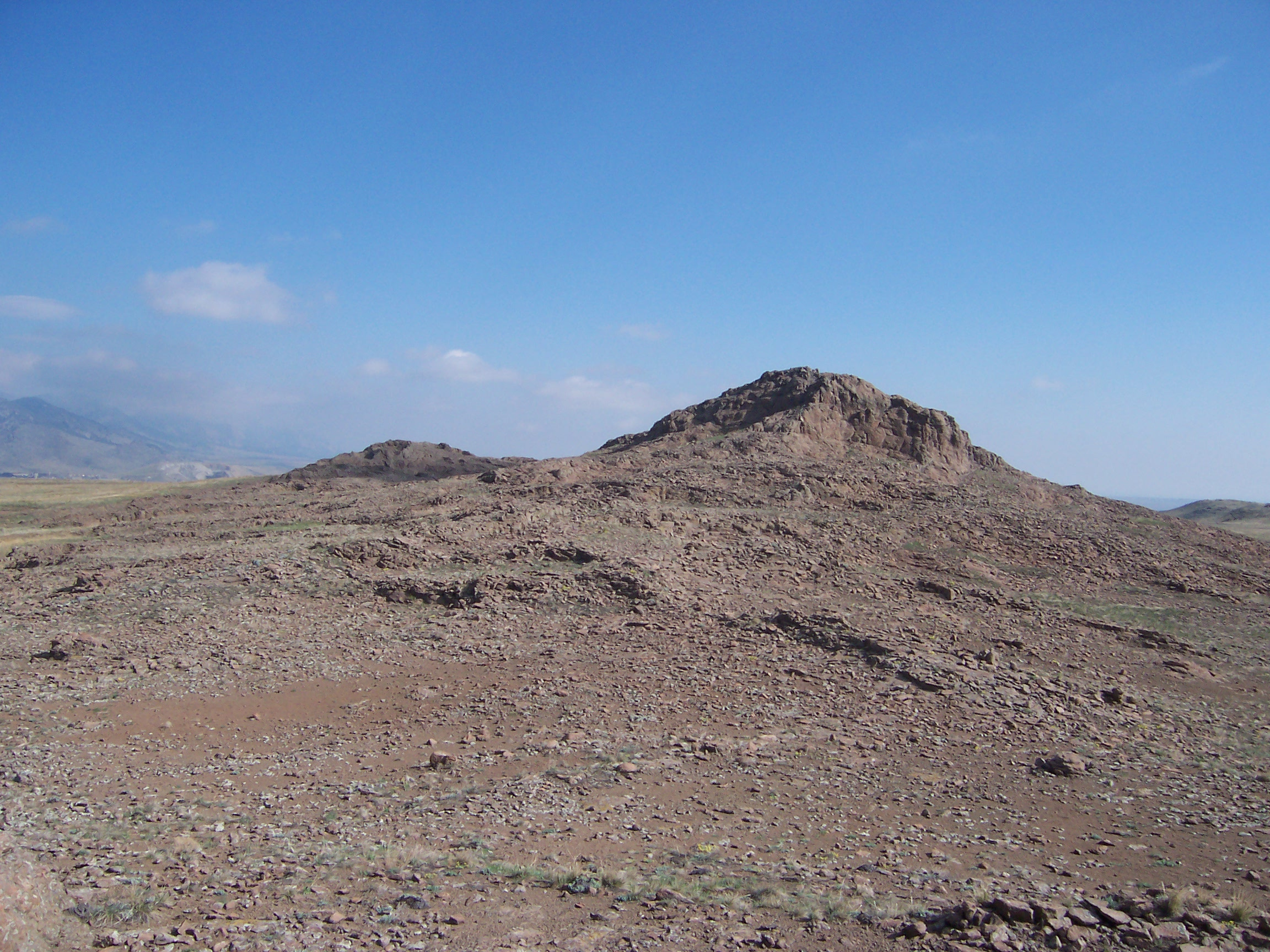
Located on the west side of the mesa is the high point, Lichen Peak (6555 ft).

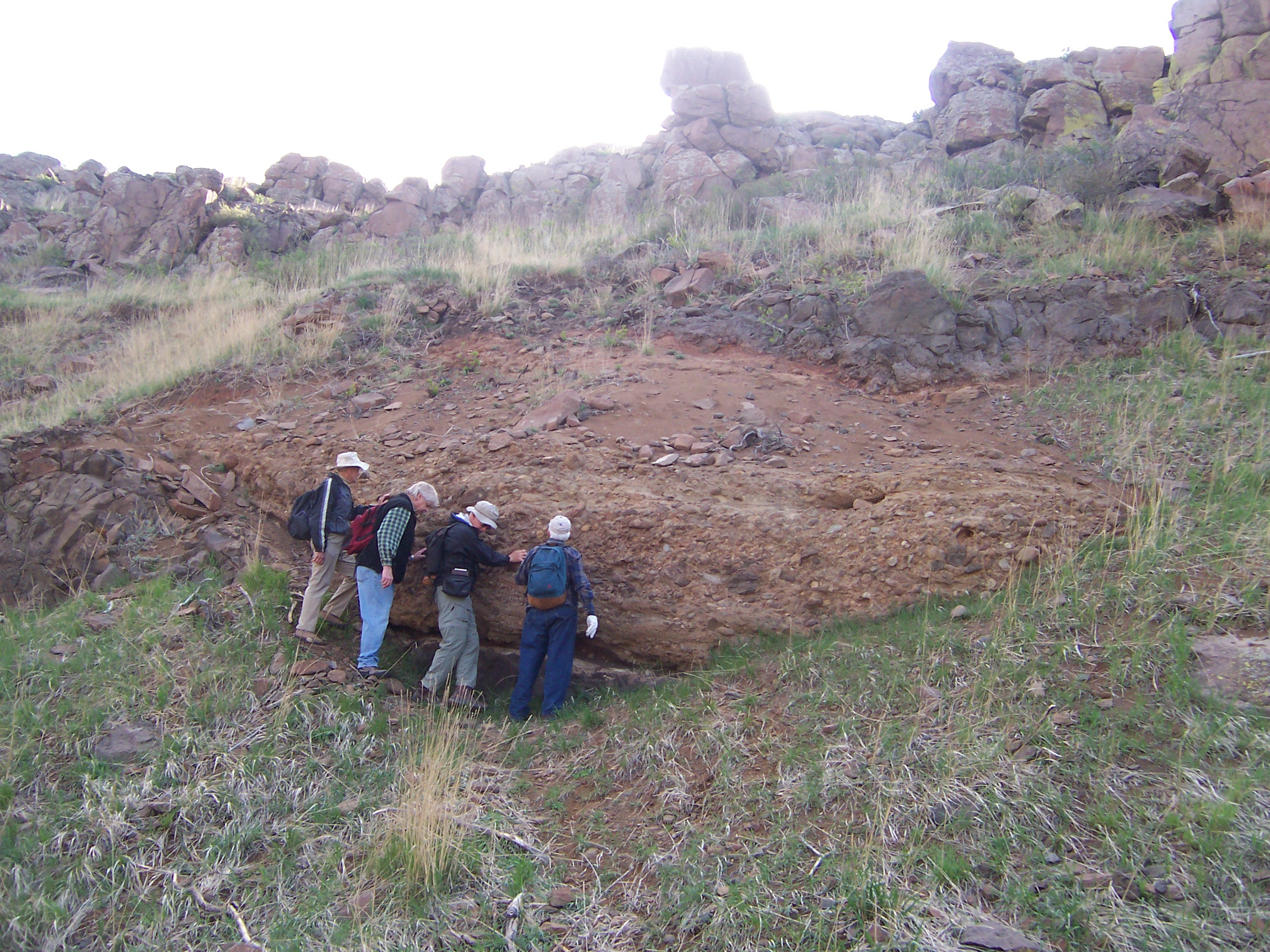
Geologists examining an ancient stream bed deposit exposed below the lava flows on the western slopes of North Table Mountain.

== See also ==
- List of Colorado mountain ranges
- List of Colorado mountain summits
  - List of Colorado fourteeners
  - List of Colorado 4000 meter prominent summits
  - List of the most prominent summits of Colorado
- List of Colorado county high points
