= Mandrasuchus =

Mandrasuchus Temporal range: Early Paleocene (Danian), 65.4 Ma
- Two skulls of M. milleri

Scientific classification
- Kingdom: Animalia
- Phylum: Chordata
- Class: Reptilia
- Order: Crocodylia
- Family: Alligatoridae
- Subfamily: Alligatorinae
- Genus: †Mandrasuchus; Lessner et al, 2026
- Species: †M. milleri

Binomial name
- †Mandrasuchus milleri Lessner et al., 2026

Extinct crocodilian genus

Mandrasuchus is an extinct genus of alligatorine from the earliest Paleocene Corral Bluffs (Denver Formation) fossil site Colorado, USA. It represents the oldest confirmed alligatorine, appearing in the fossil record within the first million years following the K-Pg event. Mandrasuchus was recovered as a member of the subfamily Alligatorinae, possibly a close relative of Allognathosuchus mooki and Wannaganosuchus. It seems to have reached a length of up to 2 m (6 ft 7 in) and may have been a macro-generalist predator, capable of both feeding on relatively large prey while also using its more globular posterior teeth to crush the shells of molluscs, crustaceans and perhaps turtles. Some evidence suggests that it might have been capable of burrowing, possibly creating the horizontal chambered burrows found in the mudstone of Corral Bluffs.

== History and naming ==
All fossil material of Mandrasuchus comes from the Corral Bluffs study area of the Denver Basin, Colorado, which represents a Danian exposure of the Denver Formation, having been preserved within the first million years after the K–Pg event that whiped out the dinosaurs. A large number of specimens have been attributed to Mandrasuchus, with specimen DMNH EPV.48541, consisting of a skull, tail, osteoderms, and a number of limb fossils, serving as the holotype in the 2026 description by Lessner and colleagues. The referred material puts the number of specimens into the double digits and includes a number of additional skulls and postcranial fossils, as well as some more isolated finds like teeth and osteoderms.

The name Mandrasuchus derives from the Greek word "mandra" (μᾰ́νδρᾱ), referring to a pen or an enclosed space, and "suchus" (Σοῦχος), a suffix frequently used in the scientific names of crocodylomorphs derived from the Egyptian deity Sobek. The first part of the generic name has been explained as a reference to the location of its discovery. The species name "milleri" comes from Ian Miller, who was responsible for the discovery of many specimens while working at the Denver Museum of Nature & Science.

== Phylogeny ==
Lessner and colleagues ran multiple phylogenetic analyses to determine the position of Mandrasuchus among alligatoroids, with the matrix based on the prior work of Rio and Mannion and differing between analyses in that one used their combined scoring of the taxon Navajosuchus mooki while another divided said taxon into Allognathosuchus mooki, Navajosuchus novomexicanus and specimen MCZ 8381. Analysis without constraints suggested that Mandrasuchus was the sister taxon to MCZ 8381 and Allognathosuchus mooki, with Wannaganosuchus as this group's next closest relative. More broadly speaking, these forms claded with a number of other early alligatoroids, including Ceratosuchus, Hassiacosuchus, Brachychampsa and others, which was recovered as the sister clade to a grouping formed by Allognathosuchus polyodon and Alligator. Constrained analyis placed the clade including Mandrasuchus as much more basally, clading with Eocaiman, Procaimanoidea and Arambourgia but with poorer support. When the three specimens attributed to Navajosuchus are coded as a single unit, two different results were found. In one, Mandrasuchus clades with Brachychampsa, while Stangerochampsa and Wannaganosuchus are recovered as successively more basal taxa to this grouping. In this analysis, the recovered clade is further closely allied with a group formed by Hassiacosuchus and Ceratosuchus, together forming the sister-group to alligatorines. In the other analysis treating Navajosuchus as a single form, the results mirror those of the previously mentioned unconstrained analysis, recovering Mandrasuchus as close to Eocaiman and related forms.

Ultimately, Lessner and colleagues favor the topology recovered by treating the three specimens that traditionally make up Navajosuchus as separate and without constraints. They reason that this result, in addition to being monophyletic, is the most congruent from a stratigraphic standpoint and would involve the least amount of homoplasies, i.e., features that would have been lost or evolved independently. The results of this analysis are shown below.

- Alligatorinae
  - Eocaiman cavernensis
  - - Eocaiman palaeocenicus
    - - - Procaimanoidea
        - Arambourgia
      - - - Allognathosuchus polyodon
          - Alligator spp.
        - - Allognathosuchus wartheni
          - - Navajosuchus novomexicanus
            - - Stangerochampsa
              - - - Brachychampsa
                  - - Ceratosuchus
                    - Hassiacosuchus
                - - Wannaganosuchus
                  - - Mandrasuchus
                    - - Allognathosuchus mooki
                      - MCZ 8381

== Temporal range ==
As of its description in 2026, Mandrasuchus is the oldest confirmed alligatorine, having lived during a period of roughly 500.000 years within the first million years of the K-Pg event that killed the non-avian dinosaurs. This places it within the Puercan 1, 2, and 3 intervals of the NALMA (North American Land Mammal Ages), whereas the next oldest alligatorine is only known from the Puercan 3 of the Nacimiento Formation, therefore making said animal slightly younger than Mandrasuchus. The closely related MCZ 8381 and Navajosuchus novomexicanus are both from the Torrejonian Nacimiento Formation, and Wannaganosuchus lived as recently as the late Paleocene around 58 Mya.

Lessner and colleagues also mention the possibility of Mandrasuchus extending beyond the K-Pg boundary. In addition to the Corral Bluffs material, they report teeth and osteoderms from the Paleocene West Bijou Creek Research Area within 10 meters of the boundary and from sediments in Weld County that represent Late Cretaceous strata. However, a number of other crocodilians with similar dentition are known from the Late Cretaceous northern hemisphere, making the assignment of the aforementioned teeth to Mandrasuchus less than certain.

== Paleobiology ==
Mandrasuchus is one of three semi-aquatic predators known from the Corral Bluffs site of the Denver Formation immediately following the K-PG impact alongside the eusuchian Borealosuchus sternbergii and the entirely unrelated Champsosaurus. Among these, Mandrasuchus is slightly smaller than Borealosuchus, reaching only 2 m (6 ft 7 in) compared to the 2.3 m (7 ft 7 in) achieved by Corral Bluffs Borealosuchus specimens (although members of the species are known to reach 3 m (9.8 ft) in other parts of North America). All three animals likely inhabit the same kind of environments and are accordingly found alongside each other frequently. To allow for niche partitioning and avoid competition for each other, each of them evolved different hunting styles with matching morphology.

Champsosaurus with its gracile and elongated snout filled with conical teeth is generally thought to be a piscivore, while Borealosuchus has been variously interpreted as a piscivore or a generalist predator. Historically, globidontan alligatoroids have been interpreted as specialized durophages owing to their blunt posterior teeth and rounded snouts, though some recent works reject such a narrow ecology. The teeth of animals like Madrasuchus could also indicate a macro-generalist diet similar to that seen in modern alligators, with the heterodont dentition both allowing the animal to go after the same prey as other generalists while also giving it the ability to crunch through the shells of molluscs, crustaceans and turtles. Smaller hard-shelled organisms may have been swallowed whole, while the crushing teeth could have been employed when processing larger rigid prey. At the same time, the animal could have retained the ability to scavenge from larger-bodied carcasses or even capture prey larger than itself, as has been hypothesized for Wannaganosuchus. Abundance of species within Corral Bluffs may have also been a factor in how these animals coexisted. As of 2024, only three specimens of Borealosuchus sternbergii are known from Corral Bluffs, and Lessner and colleagues state that Champsosaurus was similarly rare, contrasting with the much greater record of Mandrasuchus from the same strata.

In at least one case, there seems to be some evidence for burrowing behavior in Mandrasuchus. Fossils from Corral Bluffs are at times found encased in phosphatic concretions, possibly caused by decaying soft tissue and bacterial activity. In the case of one Mandrasuchus specimen preserving both the skull and some postcranial material, Lessner and colleagues speculate that the concretions may have been originally part of the animal's burrow. This may explain the presence of a number of horizontal chambered burrows found at Corral Bluffs and is not out of character for a crocodilian, as over half of extant crocodilian species exhibit some sort of burrowing behavior.
