= Thomas L. Golden =

American miner

Thomas L. "Tom" Golden was a miner from Georgia, United States, who was one of the earliest prospectors in present-day Jefferson County, Colorado. Golden arrived in the then-Kansas Territory in 1858 around the beginning of the Pike's Peak Gold Rush. He later partnered with George A. Jackson, a native of Glasgow, Missouri who discovered gold at the confluence of Chicago Creek and Clear Creek on January 7, 1859.

The city of Golden, Colorado is named after him.

== History ==
Golden arrived at today's Jefferson County late in 1858, joining prospectors mining placer gold at a sandbar on Clear Creek just east of North Table Mountain. There on November 29, 1858, Golden became the founding Treasurer of Arapahoe City, the first town in what would become Jefferson County. He met Jackson when the latter arrived at Arapahoe City in late December 1858, and they became prospecting partners seeking the mother lode from which the placer gold deposits washed down. The two made their base camp in the valley west of the Table Mountains from which to prospect in the mountains.

On January 7, 1859, Jackson made a major strike on Chicago Creek, near today's Idaho Springs. He told no one but Golden about the location, writing in his diary, "Tom Golden is the only man who knows I found gold up the creek, and as his mouth is as tight as a No. 4 Beaver trap, I am not uneasy." After Jackson and others followed up on his discovery later that year, it helped set the gold rush into full boom.

In mid-June, 1859, while returning from the mountains, the partners stopped on Clear Creek and Jackson fished for their lunch. He was caught in a flash flood, and Golden stayed with him, though he was certain for three to four minutes that Jackson would perish. They returned to their camp in the valley to discover a new town was being laid out there. At Jackson's suggestion it was named for Tom Golden.

Golden helped lay out the townsite, but did not remain there. He teamed with others in July to establish Golden Gate City nearby at the mouth of Golden Gate Canyon. Golden opened a storage and commission business and is said to be the first in the area to advertise his prices. Around 1860, Golden was elected to the legislature of the provisional government of Jefferson Territory, organized by area citizens in hopes of federal recognition. Golden's correspondence may be read in the Missouri Republican and Western Mountaineer, two newspapers from this time.

On September 24, 1860, Golden was married to Miss Fletcher at Nevada City. He was referred to by the title of Captain, though the presumable military origin of this rank remains unknown. Golden left the area around 1861, shortly after the American Civil War began. Many Colorado Southerners were harassed by their Northern neighbors, and Golden was rumored to have returned home. George A. Jackson, also from the south, joined the Confederate Army, but returned after the war and spent the rest of his life around Colorado.

Finding that Golden was not a landholder in the town, some historians later speculated it might not have been named for Golden, but instead after gold. However, a 1904 account written by George West, who helped lead the town's organization, proves the town was indeed named for the Colorado pioneer.

Ultimately Golden descendants returned to Colorado and the Denver area. Golden's great-grandson, Lt. Richard H. Golden, was a Denver native who served in World War II as a Navy pilot flying with Composite Squadron 13 (VC-13). He perished on May 10, 1943 when his airplane crashed in an accident near Fentress landing field near Princess Anne, Virginia. Lt. Golden was buried with full military honors at Mt. Olivet Cemetery, within view of the locations of both Arapahoe City and Golden that his ancestor knew.
