= Dawson Arkose =

Geologic formation in the Denver Basin, Colorado, U.S.

- Stratigraphic range: Early Paleocene
- Type: Formation
- Unit of: D1 Sequence

Lithology
- Primary: Arkosic sandstone
- Other: Mudstone

Location
- Region: Colorado
- Country: United States

Type section
- Named for: Dawson Butte
- Named by: Richardson (1915)

The Dawson Arkose is a geologic formation in the Denver Basin that underlies the Denver area in Colorado. It is characterized by alternating beds of arkosic sandstone and mudstone. The Dawson Arkose contains plant remains and other nonmarine fossils, and hosts aquifers that are important sources of water for the area.

== Stratigraphy ==
The Dawson Arkose consists of alluvial fan and fluvial deposits that accumulated at the foot of the growing Rocky Mountain Front ranges. It overlies and interfingers with the Denver Formation which spans the Cretaceous-Paleogene boundary, and is of early Paleocene (Puercan) age. In 2002 the Dawson Arkose was included as part of a larger unconformity-bounded unit named the D1 Sequence, in order to facilitate basin-wide studies and avoid confusion arising from the lateral and vertical facies changes that occur within the Denver Basin. The base of the D1 is marked by the abrupt facies change at the top of the Laramie Formation, and its top is placed at the base of a regional paleosol series. The Arapahoe Formation and the Denver Formation are also included in the D1 Sequence.

== See also ==
- List of fossiliferous stratigraphic units in Colorado
- Paleontology in Colorado
