= Arapahoe Formation =

- Stratigraphic range: Late Cretaceous
- Type: Geological formation
- Unit of: D1 Sequence
- Underlies: Denver Formation
- Overlies: Laramie Formation
- Thickness: Up to about 300 ft (91 m)

Location
- Region: Colorado
- Country: United States

Type section
- Named by: Emmons, Cross and Eldridge (1896)

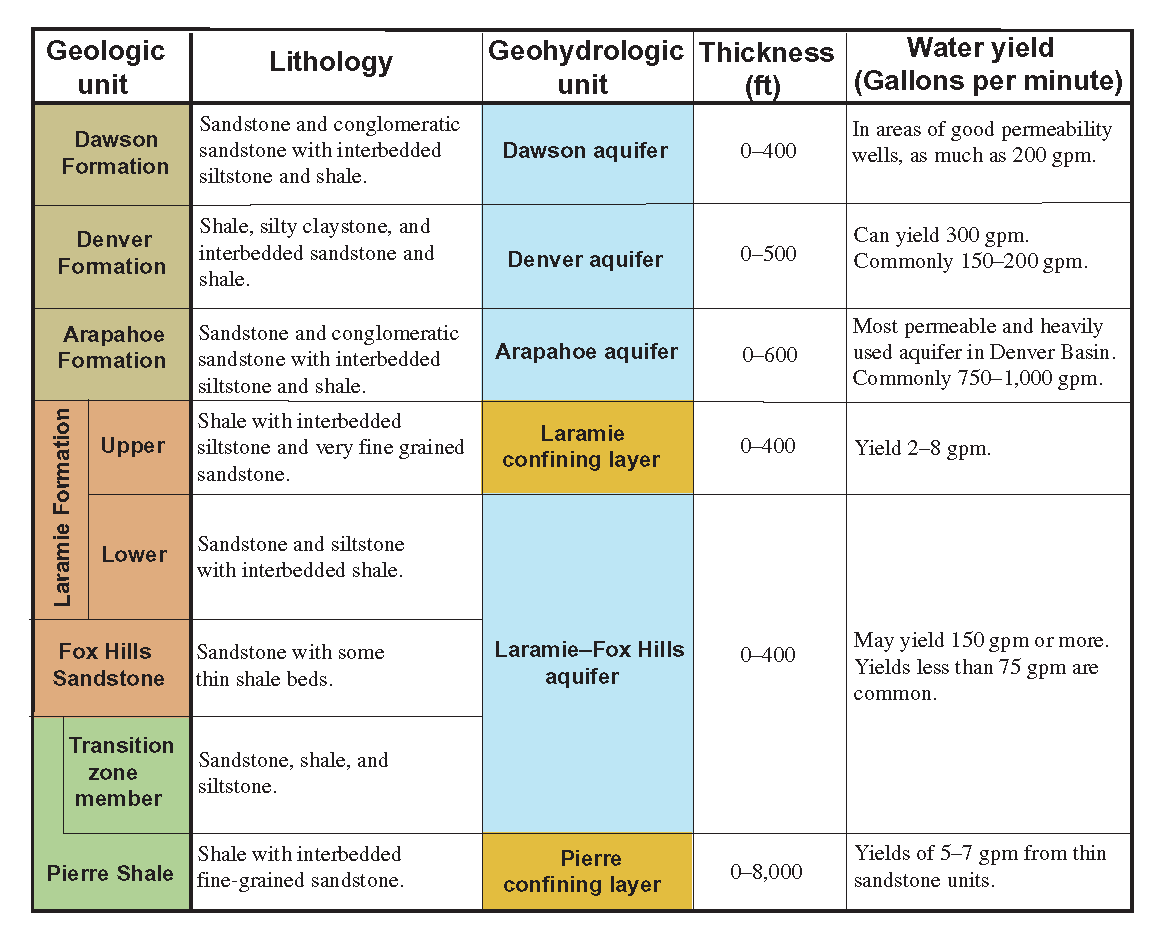
Arapahoe Formation - stratigraphy

The Arapahoe Formation is a geological formation of latest Cretaceous (Maastrichtian) age that is present within the Denver Basin that underlies the Denver, Colorado, area. The formation includes fossil leaves and dinosaur remains, although none of the latter have yet been referred to a specific genus. It also includes aquifers that are important sources of water for the area.

The Arapahoe Formation consists of alluvial fan and fluvial deposits that prograded eastward from the growing Rocky Mountain Front Ranges. It rests unconformably on the Laramie Formation, and is conformably overlain by the Denver Formation. It reaches a maximum thickness of about 300 ft (91 m).

The base of the Arapahoe Formation is marked by a discontinuous conglomerate, or where the conglomerate is absent, by sandstone beds that commonly contain large ironstone concretions. The conglomerate is composed principally of chert pebbles, but pebbles of granite, gneiss and schist are also present. Medium grey to brown claystone makes up the majority of the formation, with lesser amounts of light grey to light brown quartzose sandstone. The formation top is marked by a change from sandstone and claystone to the tuffaceous sediments of the overlying Denver Formation.

In 2002 the Arapahoe Formation was included as part of a larger unconformity-bounded unit named the D1 Sequence, in order to facilitate basin-wide studies and avoid confusion arising from the lateral and vertical facies changes that occur within the Denver Basin. The base of the D1 coincides with the base of the Arapahoe Formation and is marked by the abrupt change to conglomerate at the top of the Laramie Formation. The top D1 is placed at the base of a regional paleosol series. The Denver Formation and the Dawson Arkose are also included in the D1 Sequence.

== See also ==
- List of dinosaur-bearing rock formations
  - List of stratigraphic units with indeterminate dinosaur fossils
