= Dawson Butte =

Mountain in Colorado, USA

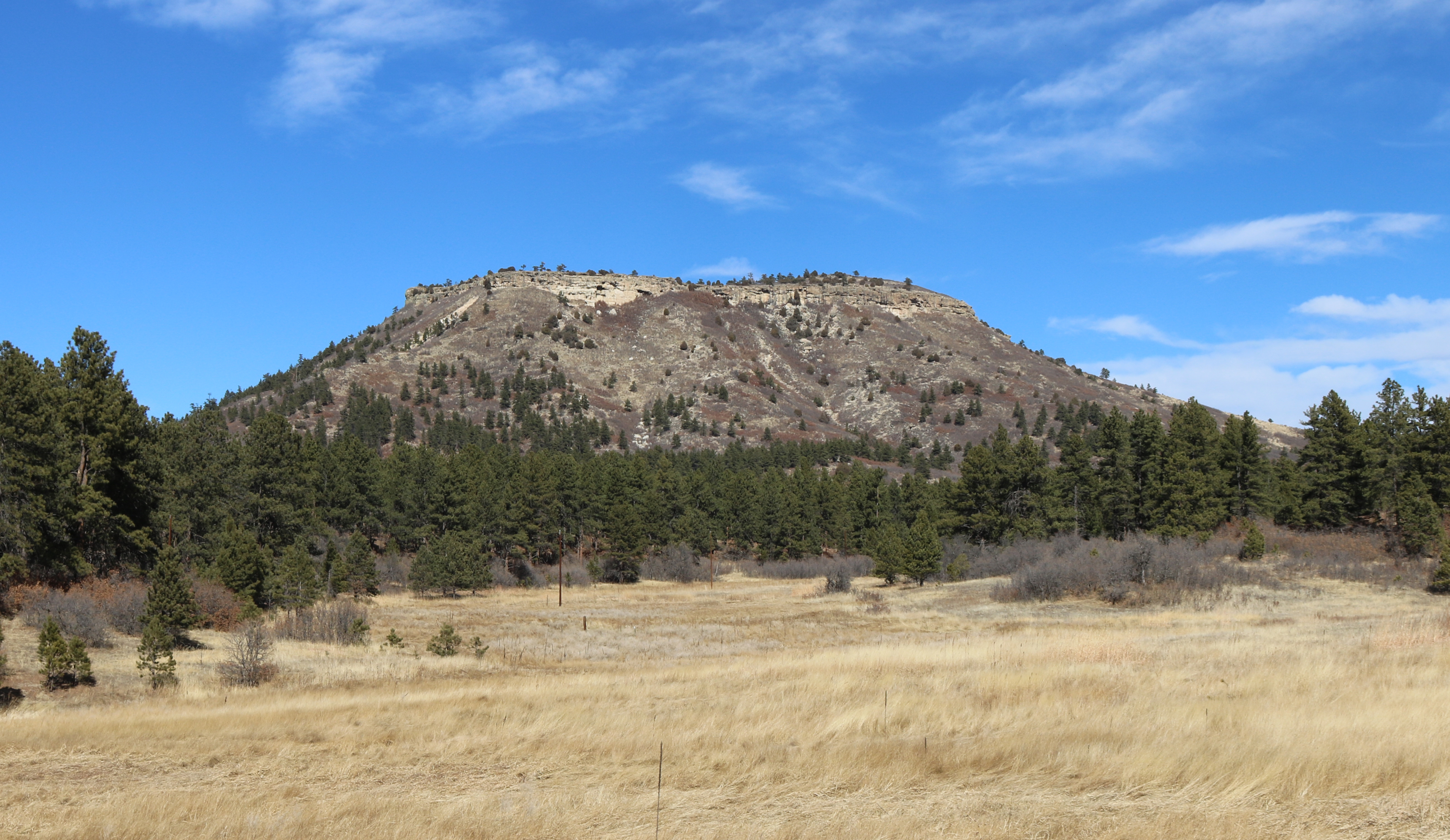
- Dawson Butte in winter

Highest point
- Elevation: 7,474 ft (2,278 m)
- Prominence: 711 ft (217 m)
- Isolation: 5.77 mi (9.29 km)
- Coordinates: 39°18′01″N 104°56′15″W

Geography
- Location within Colorado
- Location: Douglas County, Colorado
- Topo map(s): USGS; Dawson Butte

Dawson Butte, elevation 7,474 ft (2,278 m), is a flat-topped mountain in Douglas County, Colorado. Adjacent to the mountain is the Dawson Butte Open Space, owned by Douglas County and managed by the County's Division of Open Space and Natural Resources.

The mountain and open space are located about five miles south of Castle Rock.

The publicly accessible portion of the open space covers 828 acres. A five-mile-long trail loops around the open space property. The trail is open to hikers, horseback riders, snowshoers, and mountain bikers. Dogs are allowed provided they are leashed. An old bridle path remains on the property, and some of the jumps are still set up.

There is no public access to the top of the butte.

== Name ==
Dawson Arkose, a geological formation, takes its name from the Butte, which itself was named after an early Plum Creek area settler, Thomas Dawson.

== See also ==
- List of Colorado mountain summits
