= Golden, Colorado =

City in Colorado, United States

- Home rule city
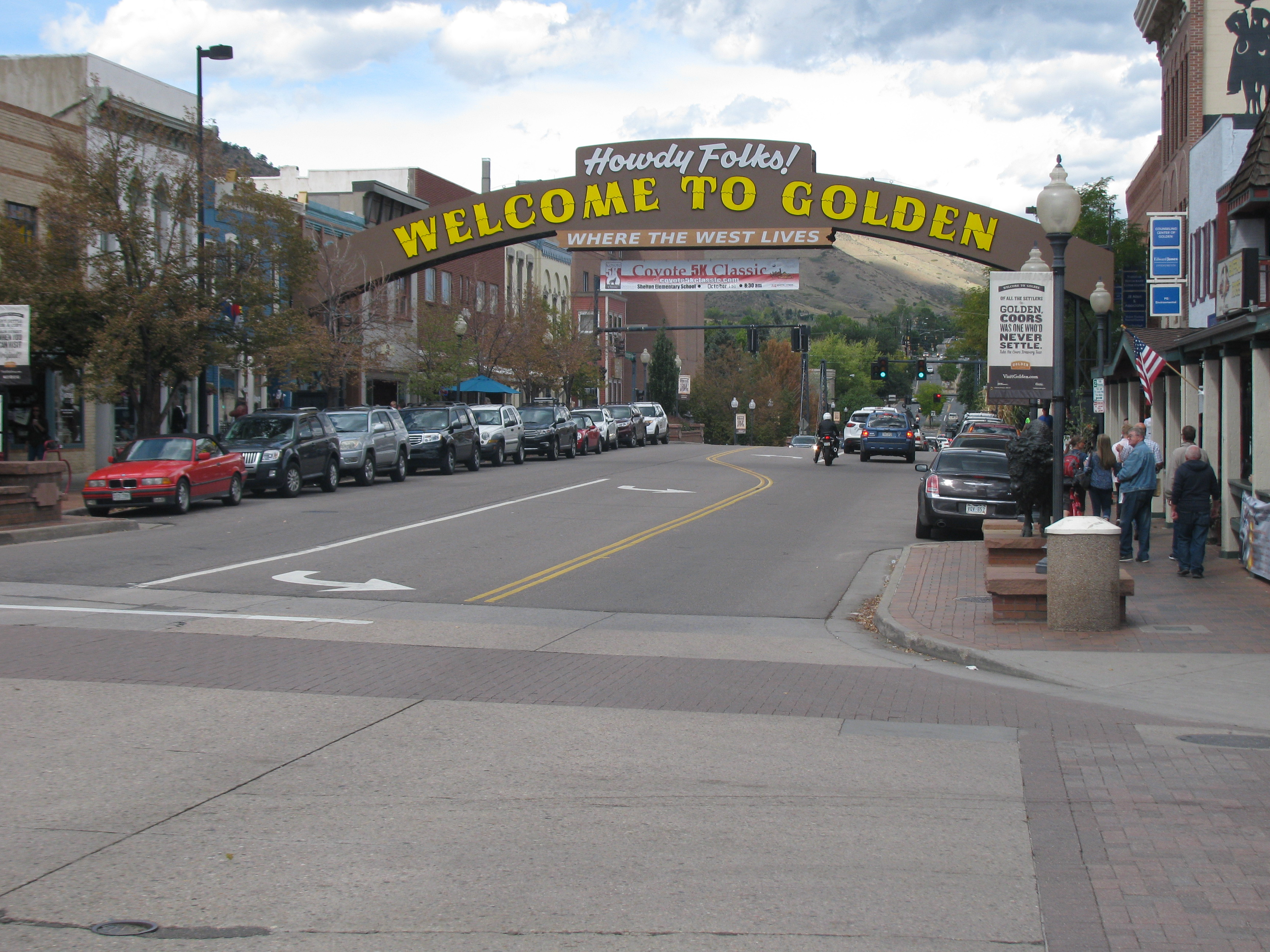
- Downtown Golden, Colorado

- Flag
- Motto: "Where the West Lives"
- Location of the City of Golden in Jefferson County, Colorado
- Coordinates: 39°45′12″N 105°12′55″W
- Country: United States
- State: Colorado
- County: Jefferson County seat
- Founded: June 16, 1859, as Golden City, Kansas Territory
- Incorporated: January 3, 1871, as Golden City, Colorado Territory
- Named for: Thomas L. Golden

Government
  - Type: Home Rule Municipality
  - Mayor: Laura Weinberg

Area
  - Total: 9.727 sq mi (25.193 km^{2})
  - Land: 9.634 sq mi (24.953 km^{2})
  - Water: 0.093 sq mi (0.240 km^{2})
- Elevation: 5,784 ft (1,763 m)

Population (2020)
  - Total: 20,399
  - Density: 2,117/sq mi (817/km^{2})
- Time zone: UTC−07:00 (MST)
  - Summer (DST): UTC−06:00 (MDT)
- ZIP code: 80401-80403, 80419, 80439
- Area codes: 303/720/983
- GNIS city ID: 2410611
- FIPS code: 08-30835
- Website: cityofgolden.gov
- Colorado Territorial Capital from 1862 to 1867

Golden is a home rule city that is the county seat of Jefferson County, Colorado, United States. The city population was 20,399 at the 2020 United States census. Golden lies along Clear Creek at the base of the Front Range of the Rocky Mountains. Founded during the Pike's Peak gold rush on June 16, 1859, the mining camp was originally named Golden City in honor of Thomas L. Golden. Golden City served as the capital of the provisional Territory of Jefferson from 1860 to 1861, and capital of the official Territory of Colorado from 1862 to 1867. In 1867, the territorial capital was moved about 12 miles (19 km) east to Denver City. Golden is now a part of the Denver-Aurora-Centennial, CO Metropolitan Statistical Area and the Front Range Urban Corridor.

The Colorado School of Mines, offering programs in engineering and science, is located in Golden. It is also home to the National Earthquake Information Center, on the campus of Mines; and the National Laboratory of the Rockies, a federally-funded science institution. Additionally, Coors Brewing Company, CoorsTek, Spyderco, Software Bisque, American Mountaineering Center, and Colorado Railroad Museum are located in the city. It is the birthplace of the Jolly Rancher, a candy bought out by the Hershey Foods Corporation, and home to Yeti Cycles. Western showman William F. "Buffalo Bill" Cody is buried nearby on Lookout Mountain.

== History ==
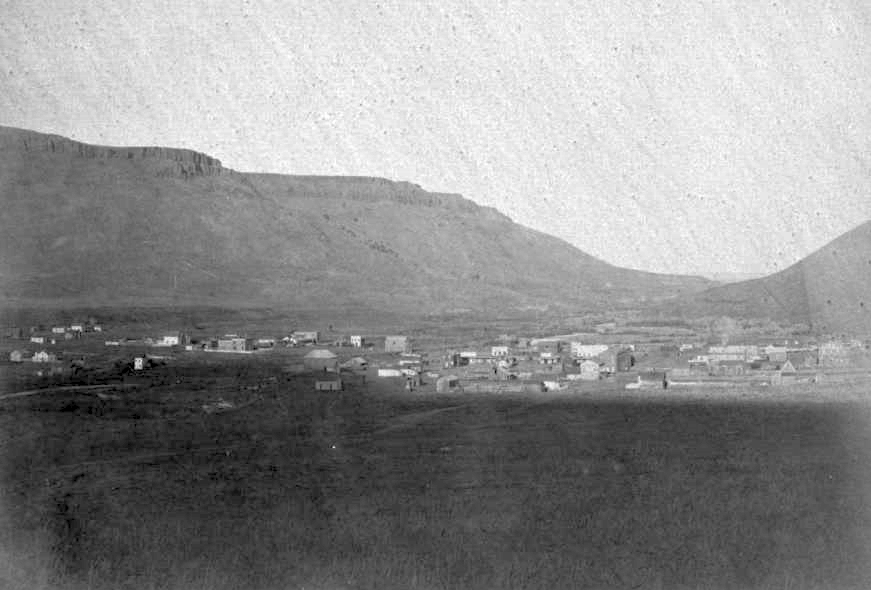
Golden in 1868

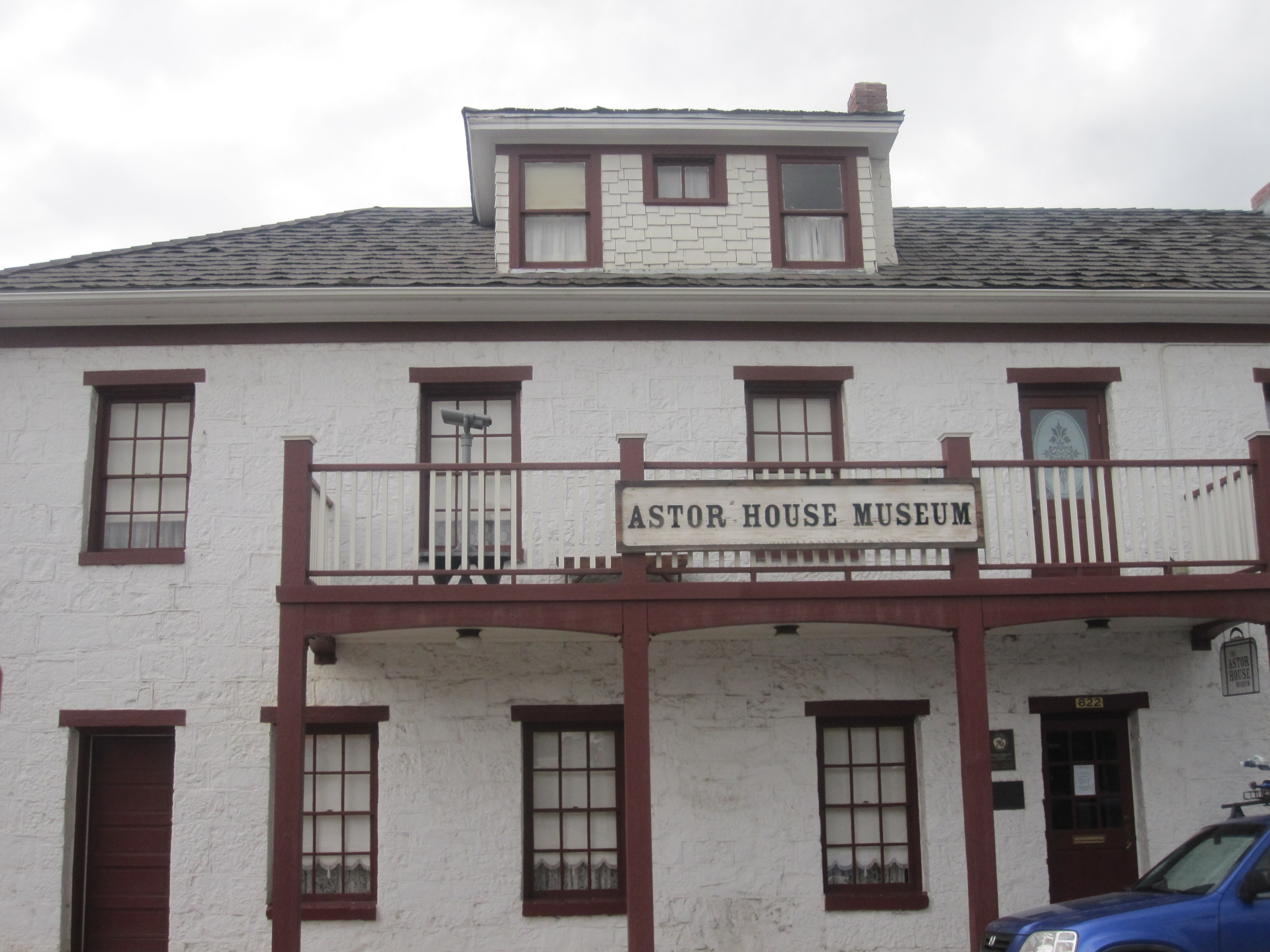
The Astor House Museum, the first stone building in Golden, was a boarding and rooming house from 1867 to 1971.

Established during the Pike's Peak Gold Rush, Golden City quickly became a leading economic and political center of the region. Its geographic location made it a center of trade between the gold fields to the west and settlements to the east. Golden City was established on June 16, 1859, along Clear Creek west of Denver. The city is named after Thomas L. Golden. Other important businessmen and prospectors like William A.H. Loveland and George West were among the first people to settle in Golden.

By the end of 1860, Golden City had been popularly elected the seat of Jefferson County and was capital of the provisional Jefferson Territory. As drafted in the territorial constitution, the capital of the Jefferson Territory was initially proposed to be Golden, then with a population of 700, as a result of its proximity to mountain mining towns, and greater ability to hold a congressional quorum than had Denver. Golden City was temporarily removed from the status of territory capital as a result of an act passed on November 5, 1861, by the territorial government.

Colorado City, a small town to the south of Denver, became the new temporary territorial capital, but saw only one short event at this location. This status was quickly revoked, however, as on August 4, 1862, the territorial government voted formally to move back to Golden.

While the town lost much of its populace and leading citizenry during the Civil War for several reasons (ranging from military to economic), Golden City became capital of the federally recognized Colorado Territory on August 2, 1862, continuing as such until 1867.

Between 1862 and the early 1870s a fierce railroad competition developed between Denver, ten miles (16 km) to the east, and Golden. By the mid-1860s, Golden held a functionally honorific status as the territorial capital, rather than serving as the primary source of territorial power. Denver, the increasingly larger and more-developed city, was the focused core of important territorial occasions, with the Governor residing in Denver, and territorial legislative meetings occurring there as well. The Territorial Supreme Court, however, met in Golden throughout its tenure as the capital due to the Justices' decision in Bruce v. House whereby the court struck down a special law passed by the legislature directing the court to meet at Denver on the basis that the superseding Organic Act creating Colorado Territory directed the court to meet at the legal capital. From late 1866 through 1867 the legislative and executive branches did return to Golden in part due to the falling out of newcomer Alexander Cummings with Denver, and the Territorial Library resided in Golden from 1867-1868. However, the citizens and supporters of Golden realized that a spur from Golden to the new transcontinental railroad, running through Cheyenne, Wyoming, 100 miles (160 km) to the north, was ultimately the only possibility for Golden to reemerge as the dominant heart of commerce in the territory. W.A.H. Loveland founded the Colorado Central Railroad on February 9, 1865, to do just this.

With Golden beginning talk of creating a railroad, prominent Denver residents raced to do the same. In an appeal to the residents of Denver, The Rocky Mountain News, which was based in Denver itself, wrote an article imploring the citizens of Denver to vote to fund a railroad; "If we vote $500,000 in bonds to the Denver Pacific railway all is well. If we defeat those bonds, all hope of a railroad for the next two years is gone... Gentlemen of Denver, what will you do? The fate of your city is in your own hands." The residents of Denver voted for the bonds, spurring construction of the Denver Pacific Railway. By 1869, the railroad race to Cheyenne was becoming less and less of a race, as the Denver Pacific Railway pulled ahead of the struggling Colorado Central Railroad. Realizing they were going to lose the race to Cheyenne, the Colorado Central began expanding west into mountain communities such as Georgetown, Black Hawk, and Central City, all areas founded on and focused in silver mining.

Golden, having then sidetracked into servicing various close by mountain communities, continued to fall behind the pace set by the Denver railroad, and by 1870, officially lost the race to Cheyenne. However, The Colorado Central Railroad connected directly with Cheyenne seven years later, in 1877, but by that point, the race with Denver had been lost. Although Golden's Colorado Central Railroad offered a challenge to Denver's railroad, the better funded Denver Pacific Railway was able to connect to Cheyenne far more quickly than Golden, securing for Denver its long-term status as both capital and prominent city.

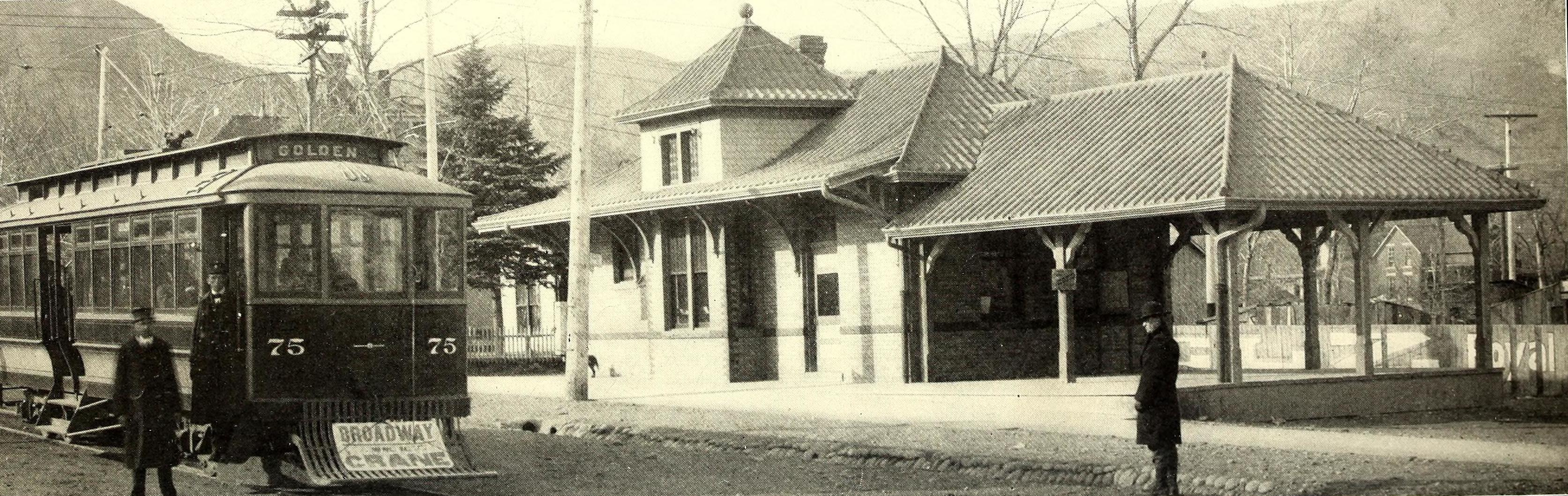
The Denver Tramway at Golden depot, 1909

Golden City became the "Lowell of the West", a regional center of trade and industry that boasted at various times three flour mills, five smelters, the first railroad into the Colorado mountains, the Coors Brewery, brick works, the only paper mill west of Missouri, clay and coal mines, and more. During the 1870s, it became home to three institutions of higher education, the Colorado University Schools, of which the Colorado School of Mines remains today. Golden was also home to an opera house and seven churches, including Colorado's third (Methodist) church, oldest Baptist church, likely oldest Christian (Disciples of Christ) church, and first Swedish immigrant (Lutheran) church. The town was home to sizable populations of German, Swiss, Swedish, Italian and Chinese immigrants; five immigrants became mayors of Golden.

Until the early 20th century, Golden maintained a small-town population of around 2,500 people. Several industries faded or were destroyed by tragic events, but others flourished to continue Golden's industrial legacy, including its brewing, brick making, clay mining and porcelain industries.

Golden became even more connected through mass transit, with two trolley lines extending to Denver, while the movie theater gradually took the place of the opera house for downtown entertainment. Downtown revitalization efforts began in the 1920s with its first streetscape and ornamental lighting project and urban renewal on its north and east, anchored by new senior high and grade schools. The historic cultural tension between the city's north and south sides gradually eased, and the town successfully endured additional major economic depressions, including the Silver Crash of 1893 and the Great Depression. The School of Mines gained a worldwide academic reputation, Coors rapidly came to the forefront of the national and international brewing and ceramics industries, and the city modernized with a recreation center, paved streets and more.

After World War II, Golden boomed, rapidly gaining population, size and economy. In 1959, the town nearly tripled in geographic size overnight when it annexed large properties to the south, including the new Magic Mountain theme park, one of the earliest entertainment attractions of its kind. A number of new subdivisions were built and public infrastructure was modernized, including new buildings for the senior high school, city hall, recreation center, library, museum and central fire and police stations. Also built were new downtown anchors, including department stores and grocery stores, and several new church buildings. The School of Mines also expanded its facilities and academic offerings under the Horizon Plan, a strategy for growth funded partly by private donations.

Golden became home to the Solar Energy Research Institute (now National Laboratory of the Rockies) in 1977. The city's central business sector weathered a recession in the 1980s, after the decline in the price of petroleum and near-simultaneous failure of several downtown anchors. The 1990s saw the revitalization of the downtown through various initiatives, including its second streetscaping project in 1992. In 1993, the old Golden High School building was converted into the American Mountaineering Center, making Golden a research and education hub for mountaineering. The Coors Brewery had become the largest single-site brewery in the world, with its porcelain subsidiary noted for its innovation in patented technology.

== Geography ==
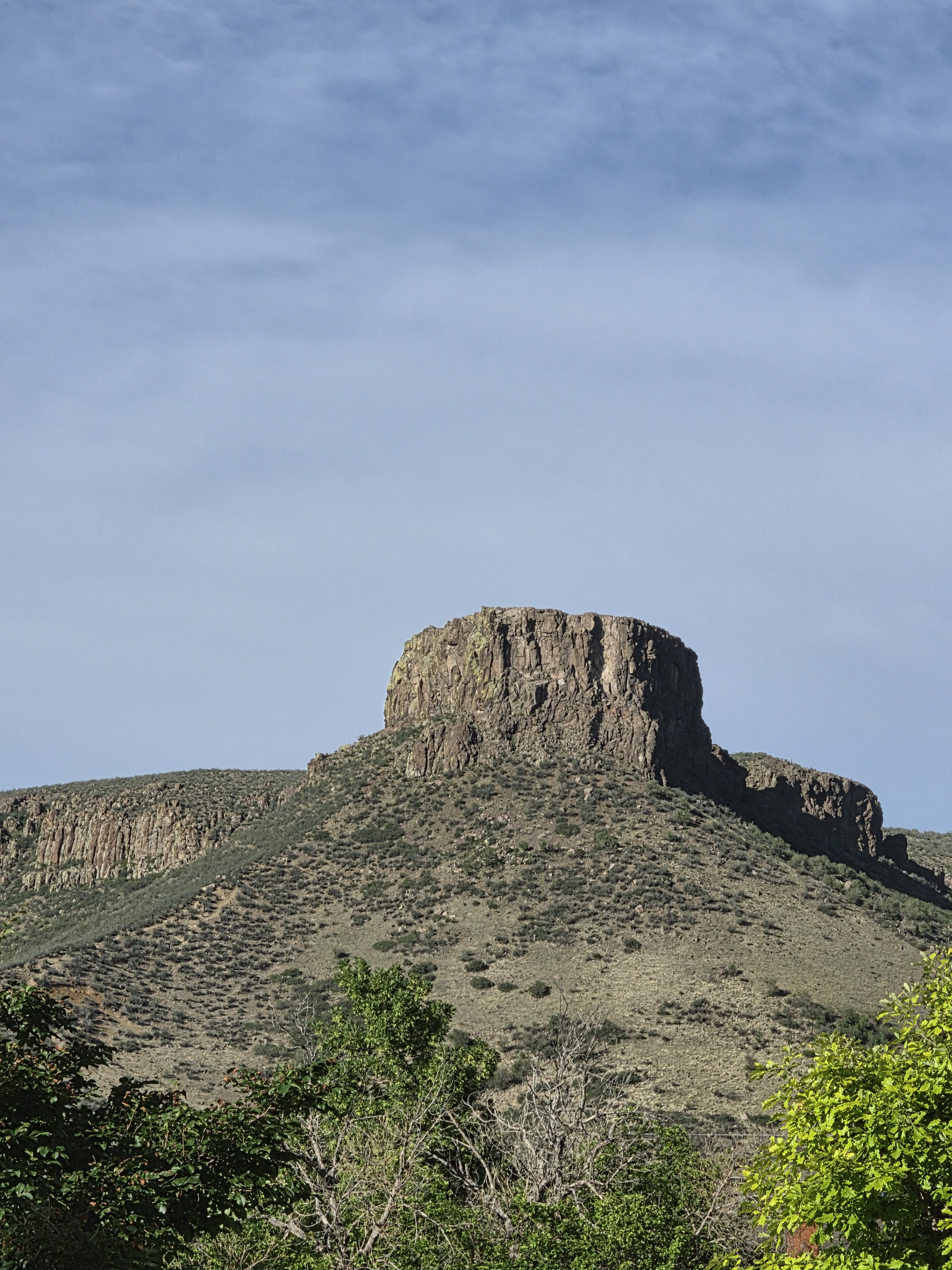
South Table Mountain in Golden, Colorado.

Golden lies just north of I-70 and west of Denver at the foot of the Rocky Mountains. It is situated between Lookout Mountain and the two Table Mountains, within a sheltered valley fed by Clear Creek. Clear Creek flows through town from the west, out of its canyon shared by US 6, and exits the valley it carved between North Table Mountain and South Table Mountain and in which is located the Coors Brewery.

At the 2020 United States census, the city had a total area of 6,225 acres (25.193 km^{2}) including 59 acres (0.240 km^{2}) of water.

== Demographics ==
Historical population
Census	Pop.	Note	%±
1860	1,014		—
1870	587		−42.1%
1880	2,730		365.1%
1890	2,383		−12.7%
1900	2,152		−9.7%
1910	2,477		15.1%
1920	2,135		−13.8%
1930	2,426		13.6%
1940	3,175		30.9%
1950	5,238		65.0%
1960	7,118		35.9%
1970	9,817		37.9%
1980	12,237		24.7%
1990	13,116		7.2%
2000	17,159		30.8%
2010	18,867		10.0%
2020	20,399		8.1%
2023 (est.)	20,242	▼	−0.8%
U.S. Decennial Census

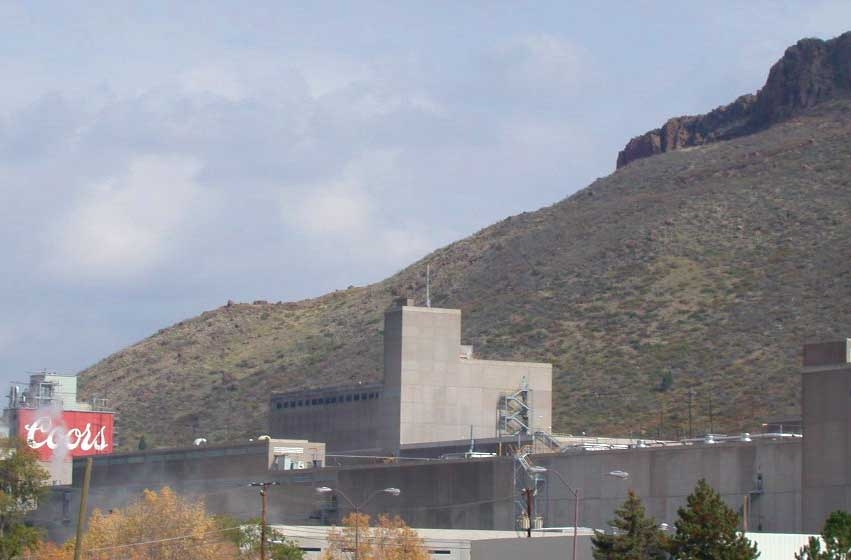
Coors Brewery in Golden

=== 2020 census ===
As of the 2020 census, Golden had a population of 20,399. The median age was 34.1 years. 15.0% of residents were under the age of 18 and 13.8% of residents were 65 years of age or older. For every 100 females there were 117.1 males, and for every 100 females age 18 and over there were 119.5 males age 18 and over.

100.0% of residents lived in urban areas, while 0.0% lived in rural areas.

There were 7,892 households in Golden, of which 23.0% had children under the age of 18 living in them. Of all households, 40.6% were married-couple households, 26.8% were households with a male householder and no spouse or partner present, and 24.7% were households with a female householder and no spouse or partner present. About 31.7% of all households were made up of individuals and 10.7% had someone living alone who was 65 years of age or older.

There were 8,522 housing units, of which 7.4% were vacant. The homeowner vacancy rate was 0.4% and the rental vacancy rate was 9.4%.

Racial composition as of the 2020 census
Race	Number	Percent
White	17,190	84.3%
Black or African American	278	1.4%
American Indian and Alaska Native	124	0.6%
Asian	771	3.8%
Native Hawaiian and Other Pacific Islander	9	0.0%
Some other race	518	2.5%
Two or more races	1,509	7.4%
Hispanic or Latino (of any race)	1,970	9.7%

=== 2010 census ===
As of the census of 2010, there were 18,867 people, 7,394 households, and 3,985 families residing in the city. The population density was 2,096.3 inhabitants per square mile (809.4 inhabitants/km^{2}). There were 7,748 housing units at an average density of 860.9 per square mile (332.4/km^{2}). The racial makeup of the city was 90.6% White, 1.2% Black or African American, 0.6% Native American, 3.8% Asian, 0.1% Pacific Islander, 1.4% from other races, and 2.3% from two or more races. 8.2% of the population were Hispanic or Latino of any race.

There were 7,394 households, out of which 23.7% had children under the age of 18 living with them, 43.4% were married couples living together, 7.2% had a female householder with no husband present, 3.3% had a male householder with no wife present, and 46.1% were non-families. 31.6% of all households were made up of individuals, and 3.2% had someone living alone who was 65 years of age or older. The average household size was 2.24 and the average family size was 2.8.

In the city, the population was spread out, with 24.7% under the age of 20, 13% from 20 to 24, 27.5% from 25 to 44, 25% from 45 to 64, and 10% who were 65 years of age or older. The median age was 33.9 years. The population was 56.6% male and 43.4% female.

=== 2000 census ===
As of the census of 2000, the median income for a household in the city was $49,115, and the median income for a family was $67,414. Males had a median income of $41,822 versus $32,413 for females. The per capita income for the city was $25,257. About 3.5% of families and 11.3% of the population were below the poverty line, including 6.4% of those under age 18 and 7.6% of those age 65 or over.

== Arts and culture ==
Golden is home to numerous museums, including the Golden History Museum & Park, Rocky Mountain Quilt Museum, Colorado Railroad Museum, Mines Museum of Earth Science, and the Bradford Washburn American Mountaineering Museum. There is also the Mother Cabrini Shrine.

Golden is home to the Jefferson Symphony Orchestra, which performs seasonally at Bunker Auditorium in the Green Center at the Colorado School of Mines, and has performed continuously since 1953. The city is also home to the Foothills Art Center, an art exhibition venue originally housed in a historic church, now calls the historic Astor House home. Miners Alley Playhouse in downtown Golden, is a live theater which has performed there since 2001. Established in 1859, Buffalo Rose Bar and Grill is the longest-surviving Colorado gold rush-era business and remains a popular music venue for touring rock and blues bands.

Golden has several annual events, including E-Days of the Colorado School of Mines in April (since 1927), the Golden Music Festival at Clear Creek History Park, Independence Day celebration sponsored by the Golden Lions Club (since 1972), the largest event of the year is Buffalo Bill Days in late July (since 1946); the Golden Fine Arts Festival in August (since 1990), and Olde Golden Christmas in November to December (since 1972).

The American Mountaineering Center is home to the American Alpine Club, The Colorado Mountain Club, and Outward Bound. The Henry S. Hall, Jr. American Alpine Club Library and Colorado Mountain Club Collection is the world's largest repository of mountaineering literature and is internationally known. The American Mountaineering Center is also home to the Bradford Washburn American Mountaineering Museum and hosts many programs and events each year. The facility and the town's location being near plenty of rock climbing, skiing and mountaineering make Golden a center for mountaineering culture.

The city's thriving beer culture supports several microbreweries, including Golden City Brewery, Mountain Toad Brewing, Cannonball Creek Brewing Company, Barrels & Bottles Brewery, Holidaily Brewing Company, Over Yonder Brewing and Ohm Brewing. Beer festivals in Golden include the UllrGrass beer festival every January, Goldenfest every September, and the Knock Your Boots Off Beer Tasting and Chili Cook-off every October.

Golden is home to the headquarters and brewery of Coors Beer. Golden was where the beer company had its start, and it has kept its headquarters in the city ever since its founding in 1873. The brewery offers tours to the public. It is one of the leading employers in the Golden area, with 900 employees working full-time in the brewery.

Panorama of Golden

== Sports ==
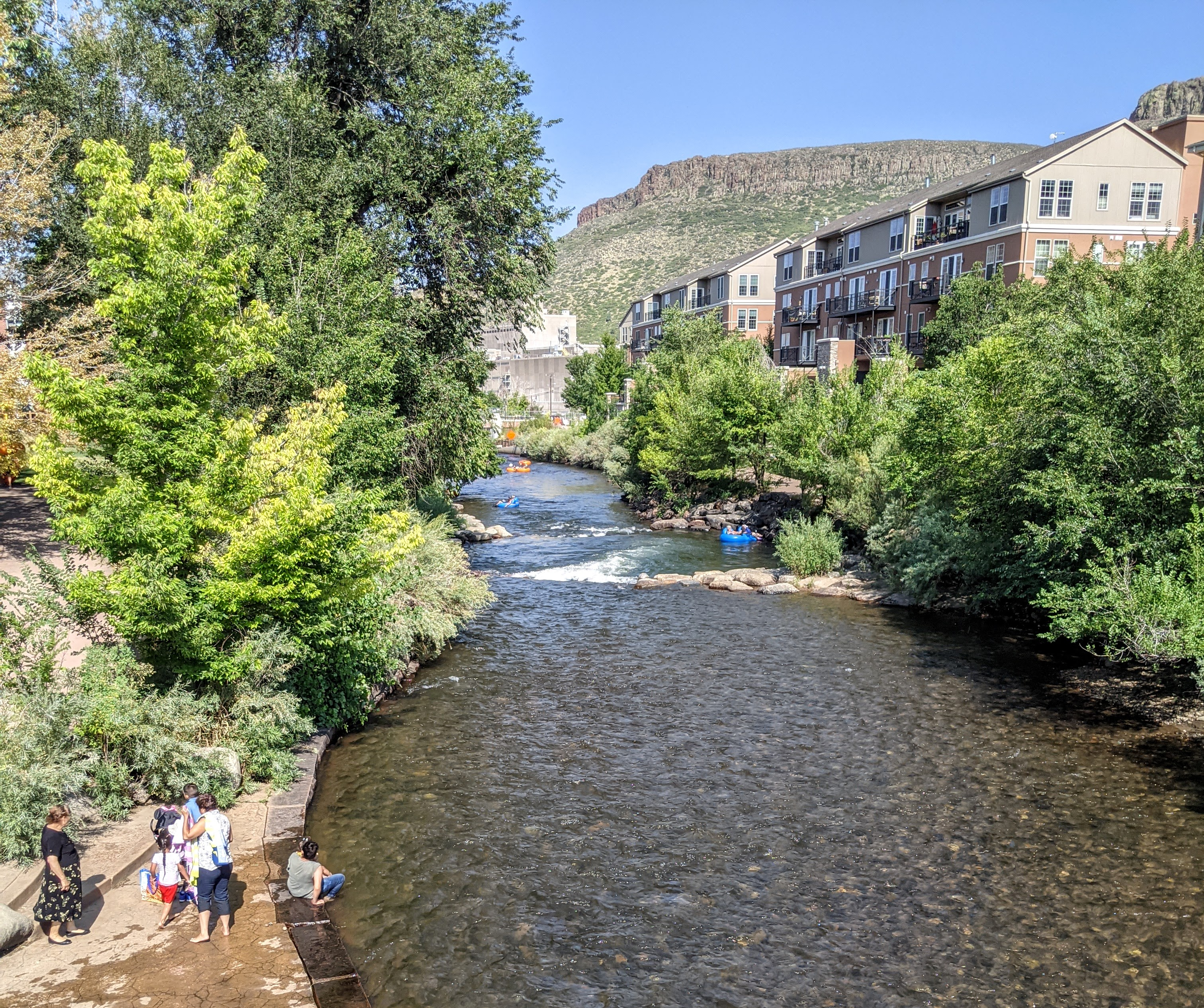
Clear Creek, looking east from the Washington Avenue bridge in Golden, with South Table Mountain and tubers

Golden's competitive athletics go back for over 150 years and feature public school and collegiate teams and athletes. Golden High School competes in various sports in 5A competition in Colorado, and its football program dates as far back as the 1890s. The Colorado School of Mines competes primarily in NCAA Division II athletics in a variety of sports including football (dating to 1888), baseball and basketball.

Clear Creek is also home to a nationally renowned kayak course, and the city is home to the American Mountaineering Center and features noteworthy rock climbing, mountain biking, hiking, and hang gliding opportunities in close proximity. Golden has to date generated three Major League Baseball players, six Olympic competitors and three Olympic medalists.

== Government ==
Golden is a home rule municipality of the city form of statutory government in Colorado. Its government is a city council/city manager form of leadership which consists of a popularly elected mayor elected by the entire citizenry, two councilors each representing a district comprising one half of the city, and four councilors each representing a ward of which each district is divided into two. These seven members of the city council are each popularly elected from their ward/district/at large and they serve as the governing body of the city. The council hires and supervises the city manager, who hires and supervises the city staff, which handles the daily operations of the city.

Golden was among the first municipally governed cities in Colorado and has one of the oldest continuously functioning governments in the state. To date Golden has held 99 popular elections for municipal officials since its first such election in 1860, including 92 regular elections and 7 special elections in 1860, 1879, 1882, 2005, 2006, 2008, and 2020.

== Education ==
Golden, originally home to the second school in Colorado, is today part of the Jefferson County R-1 School District, which provides public education throughout Jefferson County, Colorado. The city has four elementary schools (Mitchell, Kyffin, Shelton, and Ralston Elementary) in the foothills to the west, one middle school (Bell Middle School), and Colorado's oldest senior high school (Golden High School.)

In higher education, Golden features the oldest public university in the state, the Colorado School of Mines, which can be found a few blocks south of downtown Golden, situated on a hill overlooking the city. Nearby is the Mountain Language Institute, an English language school providing classes both in Golden and online.

== Media ==
=== Newspapers ===
- Golden Transcript – founded in 1866
- The Oredigger – Colorado School of Mines student paper, founded in 1920
- The Coffee News – founded in 2009

== Infrastructure ==
=== Transportation ===
==== City streets ====
The main part of Golden is laid out upon a historic street grid system running on an approximately northwest–southeast axis, aligned with Clear Creek upon which the heart of the city was established. Most of these are paved streets with a total 66-foot (20 m) right of way, including area for sidewalks which in older areas are often separated by a landscaped strip from the street featuring beautiful and historic trees. The only historic street in the grid not named as a "street" is the main thoroughfare, Washington Avenue, an 80-foot (24 m) right of way featuring a downtown care streetscape with trees, planters, brick, flagstone and ornamental street lights. Golden's streets are generally numbered on the east–west streets, and named on the north–south streets, and are named after pioneers, American Indian tribes and trees. The streets of the southeasterly part of town are aligned with the Denver metropolitan street grid, which are aligned directly with the true directions of the compass, and they share the names of the Denver grid. Outlying subdivisions of Golden consist of their own, often curvilinear street systems, with varying degrees of connection to the rest of the city. Golden has several main thoroughfare street connections to the east which date to the Gold Rush times, including West 44th Avenue, West 32nd Avenue and South Golden Road.

==== Highways ====
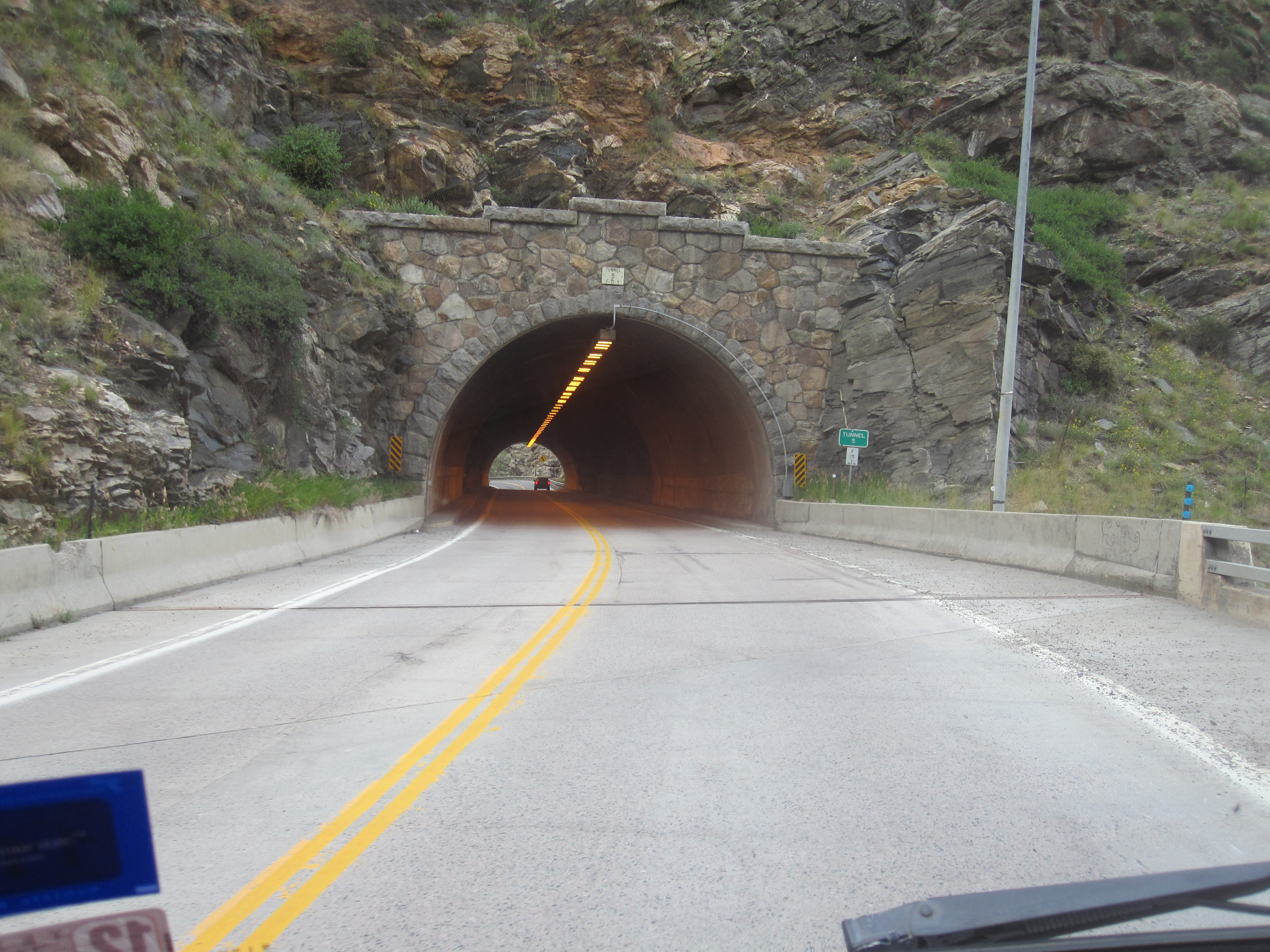
One of the numerous highway tunnels through the rugged terrain between Idaho Springs and Golden

Since its beginning, Golden has been at a crossroads of major Colorado thoroughfares. Today Interstate 70 (I-70) runs through the southern part of the city, which connects to the northern terminus of SH 470 which runs to the south. U.S. Highway 6 (US 6), which turns into 6th Avenue, is a historic thoroughfare (built in 1950) which runs east–west through the southern part of the city then curves northward through the western part of Golden, ultimately arriving at the mouth of Clear Creek Canyon. State Highway 93 (SH 93), which traces its roots to the 1860s, continues north through the western part of the city from the canyon and northward towards Boulder. SH 58, which turns into Golden Freeway, bisects Golden on an east–west route between 6th and 7th Streets, and ultimately joins to go up Clear Creek Canyon. West Colfax Avenue, the historic US 40, runs on an approximately northeast–southwest route through the southern end of the city and turns westward up Mt. Vernon Canyon and parallels I-70.

==== Mass transportation ====
Golden is part of the network of the Regional Transportation District which provides bus and light rail service throughout the Denver metropolitan area. Its bus routes 16, 16L, and GS connect Golden with other points of the Denver metropolitan area and Boulder. The West Corridor (W line) of the FasTracks light rail line, which parallels 6th Avenue into Golden to its terminal at the Jefferson County Government Center–Golden Station, opened to the public on April 26, 2013. This is a modern version of the historic trolley line that Golden interests spearheaded in the 1890s. At the same time the W Line opened, a Community Call-n-Ride bus launched in Golden, offering flexible service along with regular stops within the city itself. The new bus system was designed to complement the light rail, extending the transit service into the whole community, including the downtown corridor. Although passengers are no longer served by heavy rail, Golden continues to be served by railroad transportation for cargo, as it has been continuously since 1870. These lines are owned by the BNSF railroad and serve business interests in the northeastern end of the city. Within the Coors Brewery grounds it becomes the brewery's own in-house railroad.

==== Airports ====
The closest airport to Golden is nearby Rocky Mountain Metropolitan Airport, a general aviation air transport facility located in northeastern Jefferson County. Passenger traffic generally uses Denver International Airport in northeastern Denver.

== Notable people ==
Lindsey Horan, captain of the United States women's national soccer team and professional footballer, is from Golden, Colorado and attended Golden High School.

Notable individuals who were born in or have lived in Golden include engineer and historian Edward L. Berthoud, brewer Adolph Coors, photographer Gertrude Käsebier, and Gudy Gaskill, the driving force behind the creation of the Colorado Trail.

== See also ==
- Front Range Urban Corridor
- Golden Gate Canyon State Park
