= Corral Bluffs =

Fossil site in Colorado, US

Corral Bluffs Open Space
- Corral Bluffs Natural Area
- Location within Colorado
- Location: El Paso County, Colorado, USA
- Nearest city: Colorado Springs, CO
- Coordinates: 38°51′47.938″N 104°35′19.794″W

Corral Bluffs is a fossil site outside of Colorado Springs, Colorado. It has been designated a Colorado Natural Area by the state of Colorado. Scientists from the Denver Museum of Nature and Science have found thousands of exceptionally preserved plant and animal fossils dating back to the first million years following the Cretaceous–Paleogene extinction event.

== Fossils ==
Several mammalian skulls were found in a type of rock called concretion. Among these was a skull belonging to a newly discovered species of small omnivore, Militocodon lydae.

Dinosaur fossils have been found at the base of the bluffs.
