= Mines Museum of Earth Science =

University geology museum

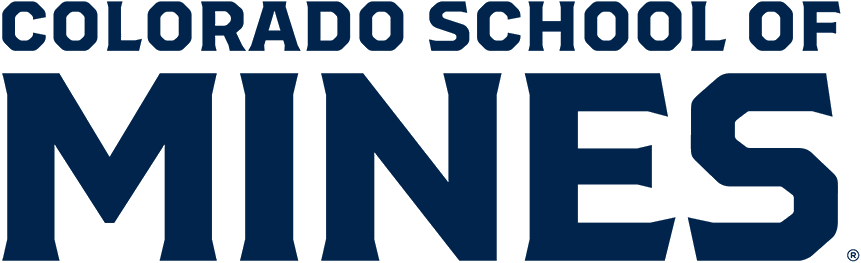

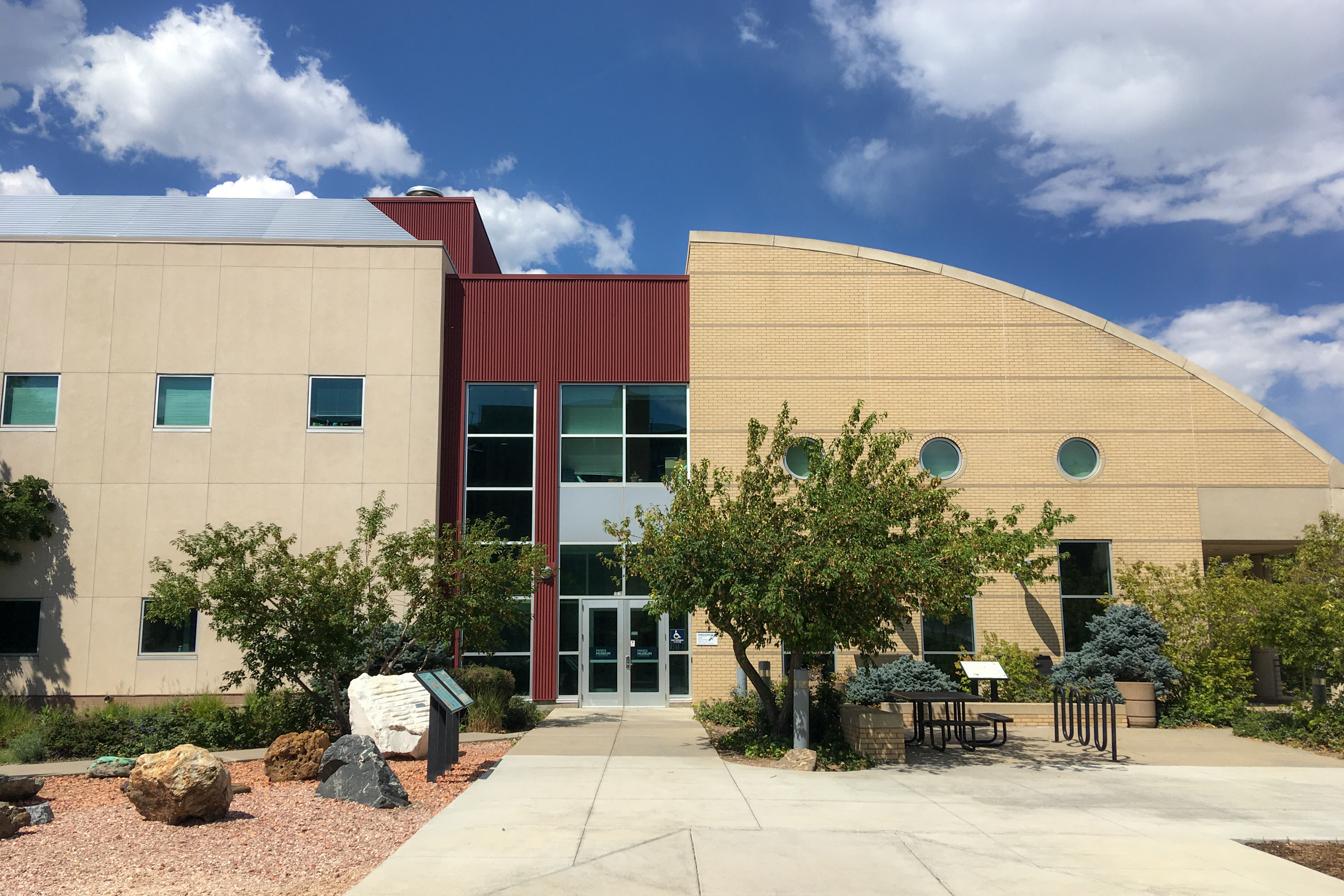
- Established: 1873–74
- Location: General Research Laboratory (GRL) building, 1310 Maple St., Golden, CO 80401, United States
- Coordinates: 39°45′07″N 105°13′29″W
- Type: University museum, geology
- Executive director: Renata Lafler
- Website: mines.edu/museumofearthscience

The Mines Museum of Earth Science, formerly the Colorado School of Mines Geology Museum, is a geology museum located on the campus of the Colorado School of Mines, in Golden, Colorado, United States. It was established in 1874 by paleontologist and Mines' professor, Arthur Lakes. The first place to house the museum's collection was Jarvis Hall, which burnt down in 1878. While the museum awaited a new home, the collection continued to grow. Horace Patton was named Curator of the collection, still used primarily for teaching, in 1893. The collection was relocated to Guggenheim Hall in 1906, but upon Patton's retirement, the collection was relegated to storage. In 1940, upon completion of Berthoud Hall, home to Mines' geology department, the collection was unpacked by its newest Curator, J. Harlan Johnson and informally exhibited there until 2002.

In 2003, a space designed specifically for the museum was built as part of the GRL (General Research) building on campus. This 15,000 square foot space is the current home of the museum with over than 3,000 items on display, and about 40,000 total items in the collection.The name of the museum was changed from, the Colorado School of Mines Geology Museum, to Mines Museum of Earth Science, in 2019 during rebranding initiated by Executive Director, Renata Lafler.

Notable objects in the Museum's collection include: the Miss Colorado Crown, two lunar samples from the Apollo 15 and 17 missions, the Allison-Boettcher gold collection, the Wolcott silver pitcher and tray, an apatosaurus femur, and "the most comprehensive public collection of Colorado minerals in the world", according to their website.

Mines Museum is open seven days a week and admission is free.

== Gallery ==
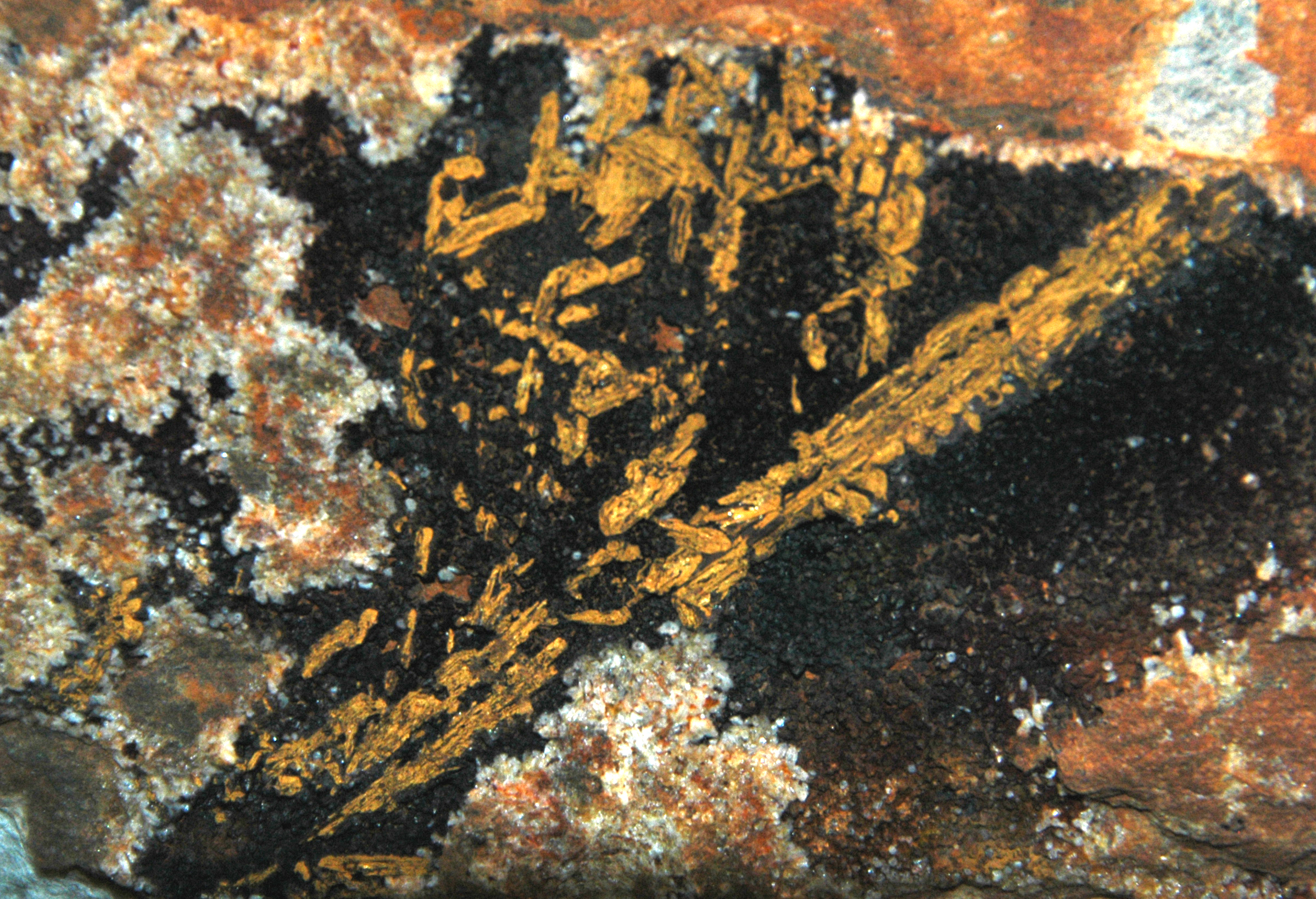
Native gold after sylvanite lining fracture in phonolite, Cripple Creek mining district. Specimen at the museum.

== See also ==
- Lariat Loop Scenic & Historic Byway
- Colorado lunar sample displays
- List of museums in Colorado
