= Lookout Mountain (Colorado) =

Mountain in Colorado, United States

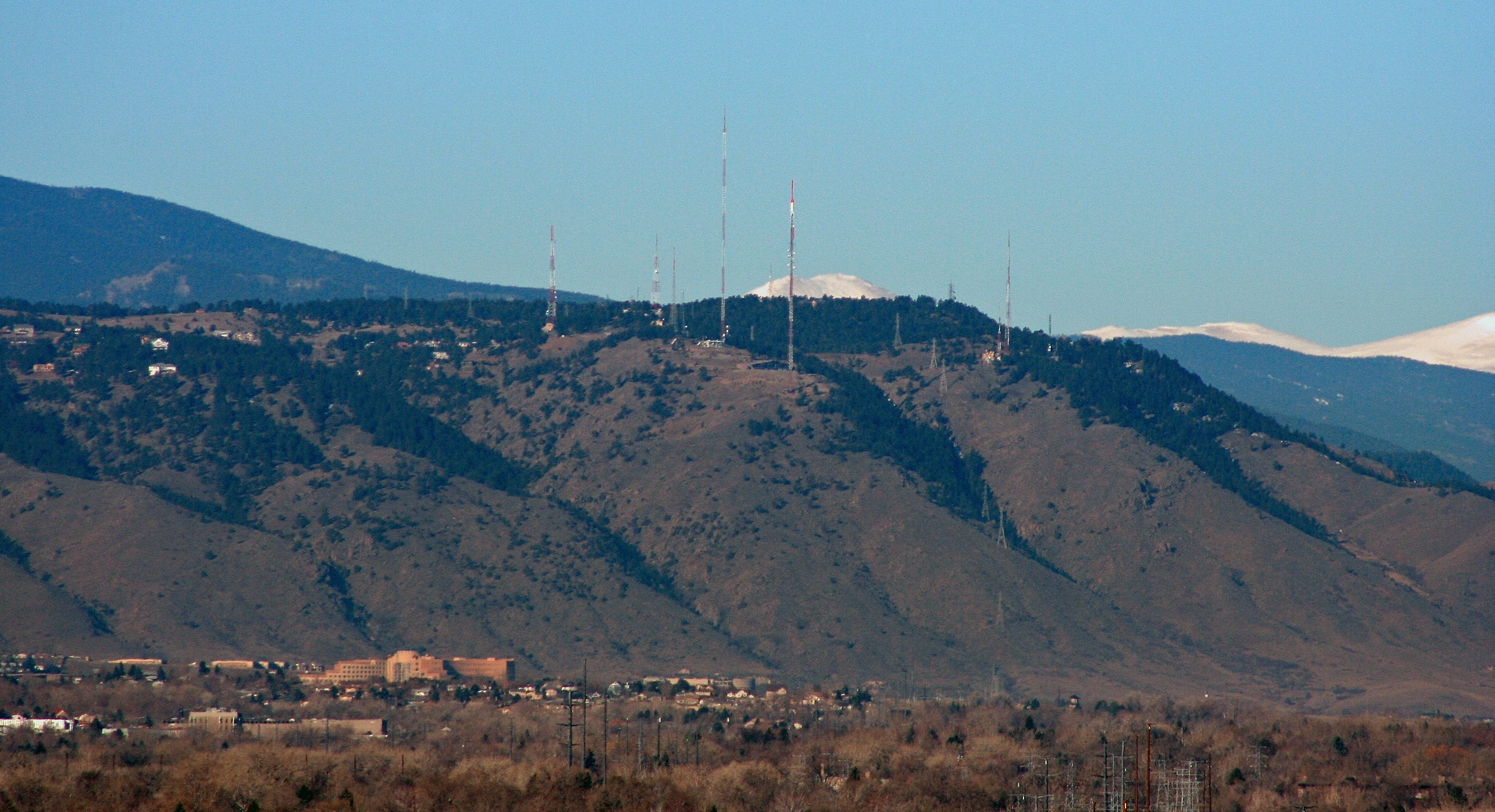
- Lookout Mountain, as seen through a telephoto lens from downtown Denver.

Highest point
- Elevation: 7,377 ft (2,249 m)
- Isolation: 0.60 mi (0.97 km)
- Coordinates: 39°43′57″N 105°14′19″W

Geography
- Location within Colorado
- Location: Jefferson County, Colorado, U.S.
- Parent range: Front Range
- Topo map(s): USGS 7.5' topographic map Morrison, Colorado

Climbing
- Easiest route: Drive

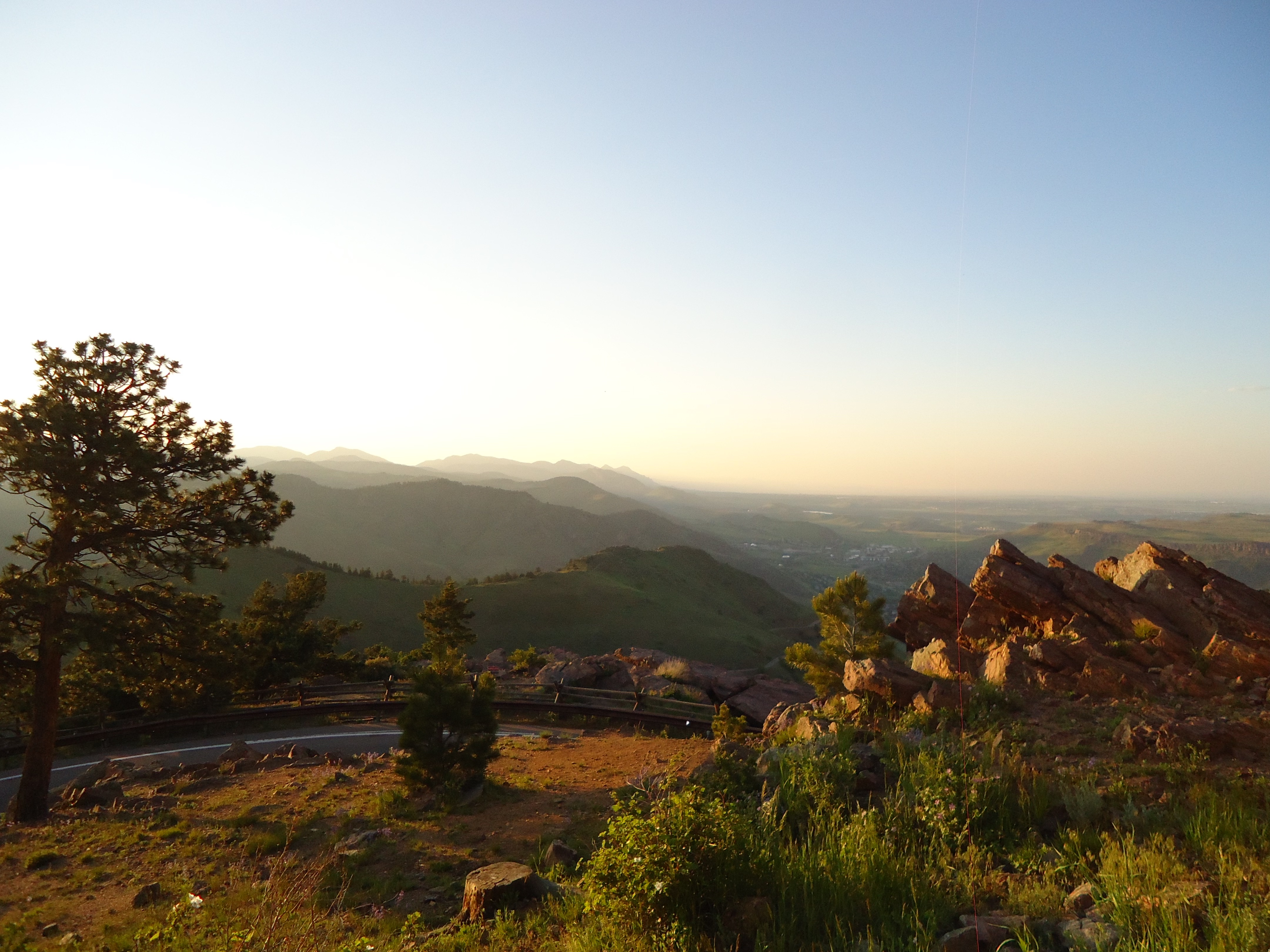
View from Lookout Mountain during sunset

Lookout Mountain is a foothill on the eastern flank of the Front Range of the Rocky Mountains of North America. The 7,377-foot (2,249 m) peak is located in Lookout Mountain Park, 1.7 miles (2.7 km) west-southwest (bearing 245°) of downtown Golden in Jefferson County, Colorado, United States.

== Mountain ==
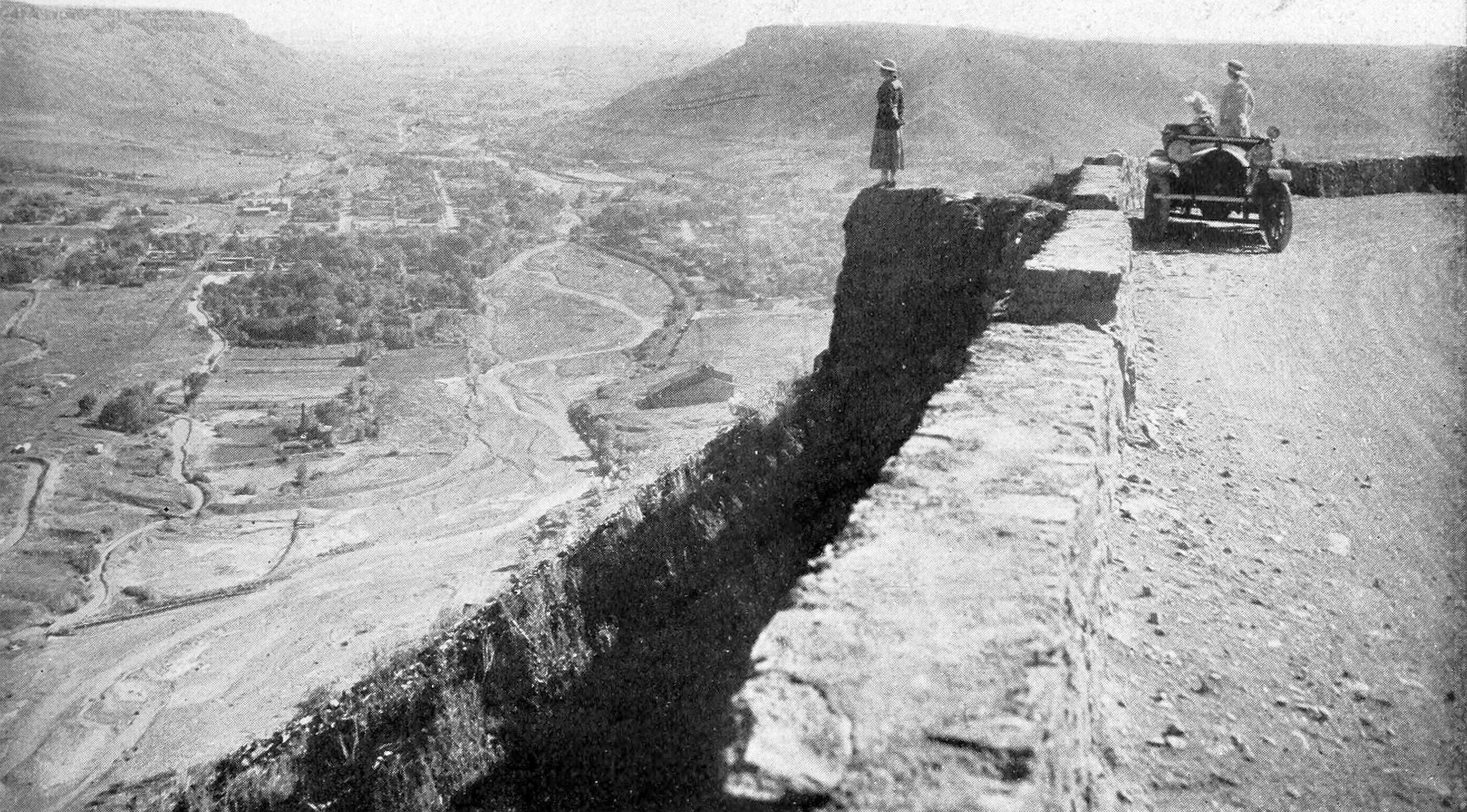
Lookout Mountain, 1917

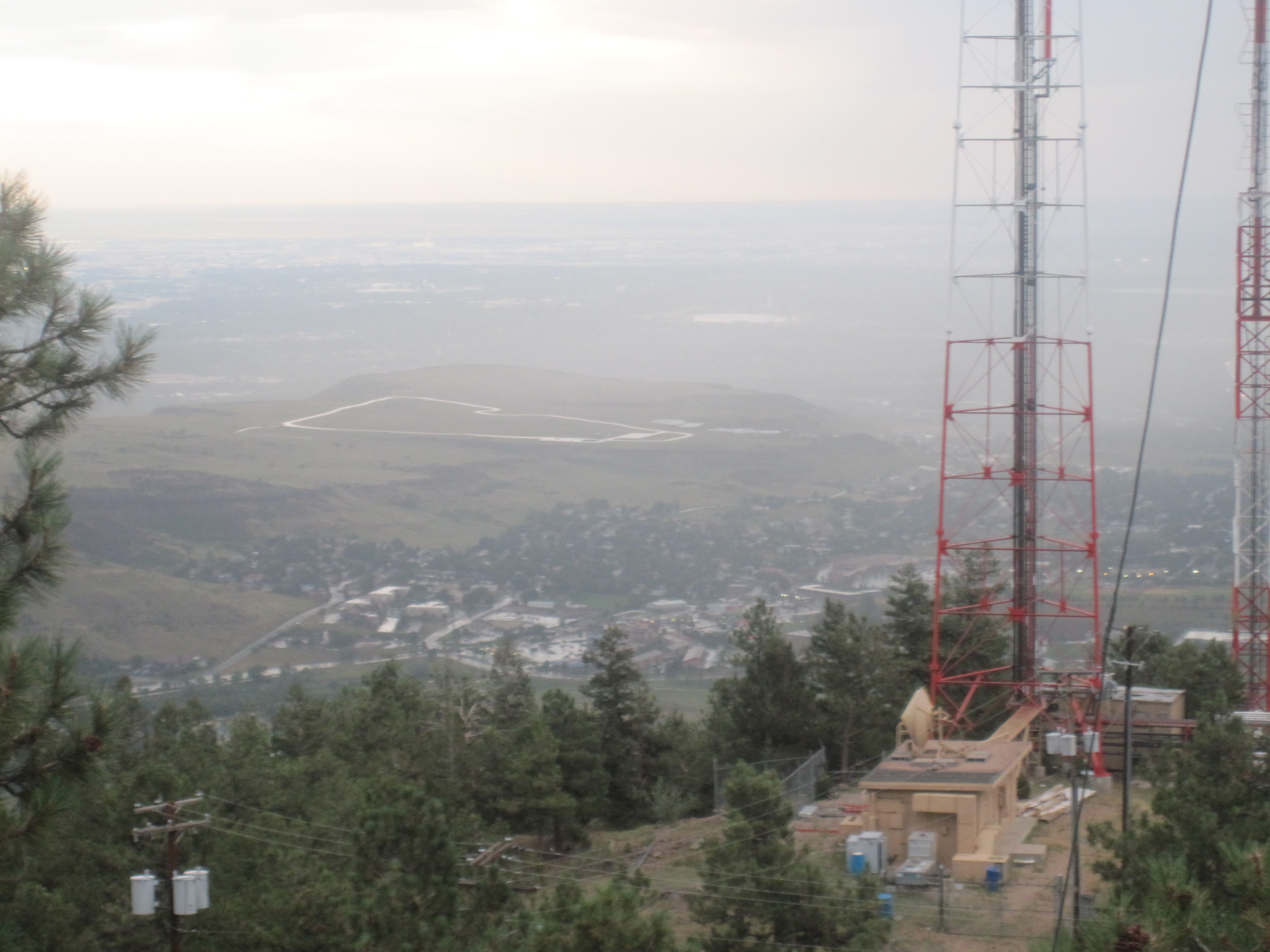
Eastern view from radio towers at Lookout Mountain

Downtown Denver, 12 miles to the east, can be seen clearly from the mountain. It is known for its natural scenery and has played a major role in area recreation, transportation, water supply and telecommunications. The summit is famous as the gravesite of William Frederick "Buffalo Bill" Cody and has several sites listed on the National Register of Historic Places. Its earliest known inhabitants were the Ute tribe of American Indians, who used the mountain as a lookout point upon the surrounding region.

In 1890, the Denver Resort Railway and Telegraph Company built a narrow-gauge railroad to the mountain from Denver, but failed to complete or open it despite being listed as an operating railroad by the Interstate Commerce Commission until 1898.

Built in 1913, the Lariat Loop road ascends from Golden up the steep east side of Lookout Mountain. Mountain bikers and hikers can also follow the Chimney Gulch trail, a difficult, narrow "single track" hiking trail that crisscrosses the Lariat Loop road twice on its way to the summit. Lookout Mountain is also popular with paragliders.

In 1917, Charles Boettcher, a Denver entrepreneur, built a summer home formerly called Lorraine Lodge on Lookout Mountain for his family that was used for hunting retreats. In 1968, Boettcher's granddaughter, Charline Breeden, donated the lodge that is now known as Boettcher Mansion and 110 acres to Jefferson County. The mansion has been restored and is now a site for special events.

The Lookout Mountain Nature Center & Preserve has interactive exhibits that take visitors on a tour of the foothills for adults and children.

== See also ==
- List of Colorado mountain ranges
- List of Colorado mountain summits
  - List of Colorado fourteeners
  - List of Colorado 4000 meter prominent summits
  - List of the most prominent summits of Colorado
- List of Colorado county high points
