= Shoshonite =

Potassium-rich variety of basaltic trachyandesite

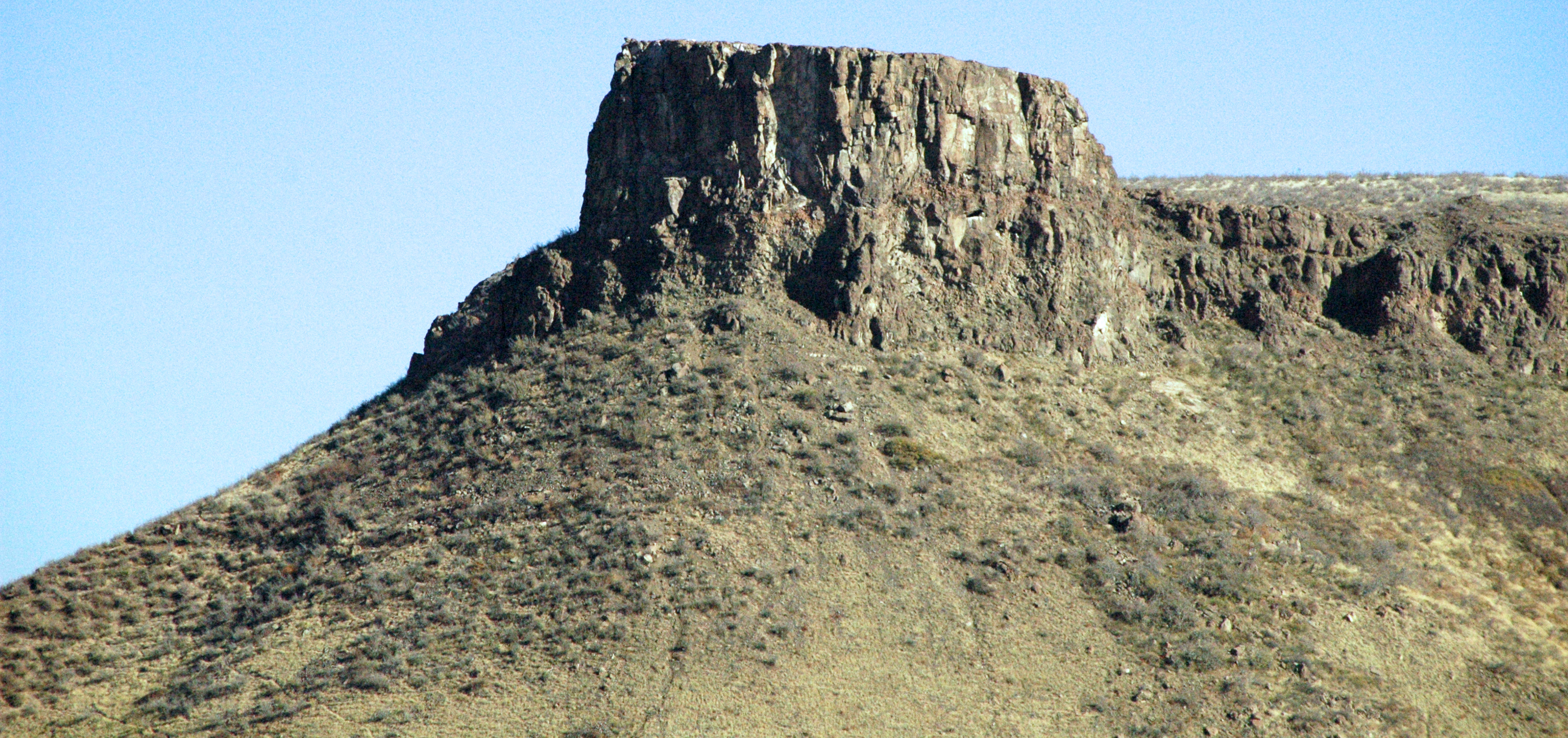
Shoshonite lava flows on South Table Mountain, Colorado

Shoshonite is a type of igneous rock. More specifically, it is a potassium-rich variety of basaltic trachyandesite, composed of olivine, augite and plagioclase phenocrysts in a groundmass with calcic plagioclase and sanidine and some dark-colored volcanic glass. Shoshonite gives its name to the shoshonite series and grades into absarokite with the loss of plagioclase phenocrysts and into banakite with an increase in sanidine. Shoshonite was named by Iddings in 1895 for the Shoshone River in Wyoming. Textural and mineralogical features of potash-rich rocks of the absarokite-shoshonite-banakite series strongly suggest that most of the large crystals and aggregates are not true phenocrysts as previously thought but are xenocrysts and microxenoliths, suggesting a hybrid origin involving assimilation of gabbro by high-temperature syenitic magma.

== Chemical characteristics ==
Igneous rocks with shoshonitic chemical characteristics must be:

1. Near-saturated in silica;
2. Low iron enrichment;
3. High total alkalies (Na_{2}O + K_{2}O > 5%);
4. High K_{2}O/Na_{2}O;
5. Steep positive slope for K_{2}O versus SiO_{2} at low SiO_{2};
6. Enrichment in P, Rb, Sr, Ba, Pb, light rare earth elements;
7. Low TiO_{2};
8. High but variable Al_{2}O_{3};
9. High Fe_{2}O_{3}/FeO.

== Tectonic settings and examples ==
Shoshonitic rocks tend to be associated with calc-alkaline island-arc subduction volcanism, but the K-rich shoshonites are generally younger and above deeper, steeper parts or the Benioff zone.

Volcanic rocks of the absarokite-shoshonite-banakite series described from Yellowstone Park by Iddings and the similar ciminite-toscanite series described from western Italy by Washington are associated with leucite-bearing rocks, potassium-rich trachytes and andesitic rocks. Similar associations are described from several other regions including Indonesia and the East African Rift.

In the Aeolian Arc in the southern Tyrrhenian Sea (between the Eurasian and African tectonic plates), volcanism has changed between calc-alkaline to high-K calc-alkaline to shoshonitic with the last one million years, possibly due to the progressive steepening of the Benioff zone, which is inclined at 50-60°. An example of shoshonite lava in this region is the Capo Secco lava shield near Vulcano. Late Cretaceous Puerto Rican volcanism is interpreted to have occurred in a similar tectonic setting.

In places, shoshonitic and high-potassium calc-alkaline magmatism is associated with world-class hydrothermal gold and copper-gold mineralization. Examples include:

Ladolam gold mine, Lihir Island, Papua New Guinea;
Bingham copper-gold mine, Utah;
Grasberg copper-gold mine, Indonesia;
Oyu Tolgoi copper-gold mine, Mongolia.
