= 2021 in paleomammalogy =

This paleomammology list records new fossil mammal taxa that were described during the year 2021, as well as notes other significant paleomammology discoveries and events which occurred during 2021.

== Afrotherians ==
=== Macroscelidea ===
Name	Novelty	Status	Authors	Age	Type locality	Country	Notes	Images
Afrohypselodontus	Gen. et 2 sp. nov	Valid	Senut & Pickford	Eocene (Bartonian-Priabonian)		Namibia	A Afrohypselodontidae Macroscelidea. The type species is A. minus; genus also includes A. grandis.	
Eorhynchocyon	Gen. et sp. nov	Valid	Senut & Pickford	Eocene (Bartonian-Priabonian)		Namibia	A Rhynchocyonidae Macroscelidea; Type species is E. rupestris.	
Namasengi	Gen. et sp. nov	Valid	Senut & Pickford	Eocene (Bartonian-Priabonian)		Namibia	An elephant shrew. Type species is N. mockeae.	
Oligorhynchocyon	Gen. et sp. nov	Valid	Stevens et al.	Late Oligocene	Nsungwe Formation	Tanzania	A Rhynchocyoninae elephant shrew. Type species is O. songwensis.	
Promyohyrax	Gen. et sp. nov	Valid	Senut & Pickford	Eocene (Bartonian-Priabonian)		Namibia	A myohyracine elephant shrew. Type species is P. namibiensis.	
Rukwasengi	Gen. et sp. nov	Valid	Stevens et al.	Late Oligocene	Nsungwe Formation	Tanzania	A myohyracine elephant shrew. Type species is R. butleri.	

=== Proboscidea ===
Name	Novelty	Status	Authors	Age	Type locality	Country	Notes	Images
Dagbatitherium	Gen. et sp. nov	Valid	Hautier et al.	Eocene (Lutetian)		Togo	A stem group Elephantiformes. Type species D. tassyi.	

==== Proboscidean research ====
- A study on changes of ecomorphological diversity of proboscideans throughout their evolutionary history is published by Cantalapiedra et al. (2021).
- Revision of the fossil material of deinotheres belonging to the genus Prodeinotherium from the Miocene Vallès-Penedès Basin (Spain) is published by Gasamans et al. (2021).
- A study on faunal and floral components of dung associated with juvenile mastodon remains from East Milford (Nova Scotia, Canada) dated to ~75,000 years BP, and on its implications of the knowledge of mastodon diet and environmental conditions in eastern Canada prior to the onset of the Wisconsin glaciation, is published by Cocker et al. (2021).
- A study on the growth patterns of limbs of the mastodons is published by Htun et al. (2021).
- Review of the state of knowledge regarding migratory behaviour of mastodons and mammoths is published by Bonhof & Pryor (2021).
- A study on the chemical composition of fossilized dental calculus from specimens of Notiomastodon platensis from Brazil, Argentina and Ecuador is published by Mothé et al. (2021), who report the discovery of the first fossilized oral bacterial communities associated with extinct proboscideans, confirming the parasitism between oral bacteria and N. platensis.
- A study on the phylogenetic affinities of Notiomastodon platensis and evolutionary history of proboscideans, based on data from ancient DNA from a specimen of N. platensis from the Arroyo del Vizcaíno site (Uruguay), is published by Baleka et al. (2021).
- Osteopontin, osteonectin and BMP-2 are identified for the first time in a bone of a specimen of Anancus arvernensis from the Pliocene Lagerstätte of Willershausen (Germany) by Schmidt-Schultz, Reich & Schultz (2021).
- A study on the age distribution and population structure of Palaeoloxodon huaihoensis from Penghu Channel (Taiwan), based on data from fossil teeth, is published by Kang, Lin & Chang (2021).
- A study on the morphology of the petrosal bone of Palaeoloxodon tiliensis is published by Liakopoulou, Theodorou & van Heteren (2021).
- A study on the dwarfing process in the evolutionary history of the Sicilian dwarf elephant, based on mitochondrial genome data, is published by Baleka et al. (2021).
- A study on bone histology and likely life history of the Sicilian dwarf elephant is published by Köhler et al. (2021).
- Tracks of straight-tusked elephants, including calves and juveniles, are described from the Upper Pleistocene site known as "Matalascañas Trampled Surface" (Spain) by Neto de Carvalho et al. (2021), providing information on the locomotion, social group structure and reproductive ecology of these proboscideans.
- Description of a nearly complete skeleton of a straight-tusked elephant calf from the Pleistocene of the Cova del Rinoceront, and a study on the implications of this specimen for the knowledge of the ontogeny of this elephant, is published by Palombo, Sanz & Daura (2021).
- A large elephant cranium similar to partial crania of early Pliocene Loxodonta adaurora is described from the Lonyumun Member of the Koobi Fora Formation near Ileret (Kenya) by Sanders et al. (2021), who interpret the anatomy of this skull as unexpectedly advanced for an elephant of its antiquity, and indicating that by the early Pliocene L. adaurora evolved adaptations in phase with feeding preference for C_{4} grasses.
- Van der Valk et al. (2021) report the recovery of genome-wide data from three mammoth specimens dating to the Early and Middle Pleistocene, and evaluate the implications of their finding for the knowledge of the evolutionary history of mammoths.
- A study on the morphology, antiquity, individual age and affinities of Yuka is published by Maschenko et al. (2021).
- New method allowing the characterization of the genetic sex for highly degraded samples of elephant DNA is presented by Aznar-Cormano et al. (2021), who also apply their method to woolly mammoth ancient DNA from the Late Pleistocene of Siberia.
- A study on the population history and extinction dynamics of the woolly mammoth in northern Siberia, based on radiocarbon and genetic data, is published by Dehasque et al. (2021).
- A study aiming to determine the mobility and range of an Arctic woolly mammoth living 17,100 years ago, as indicated by data from its tusk, is published by Wooller et al. (2021).

=== Sirenia ===
==== Sirenian research ====
- New sirenian specimen belonging to the genus Potamosiren is described from the Miocene Barzalosa Formation (Colombia) by Suarez et al. (2021), representing the earliest record of this genus reported to date, and providing new information on the evolutionary history of South American sirenians.
- A study on the morphology of the brain of a specimen of Dioplotherium from the middle Miocene Pirabas Formation (Brazil), and on the implications of this specimen for the knowledge of the evolution of the brain in sirenians, is published by Kerber & Moraes–Santos (2021).
- A study on the population history of the Steller's sea cow during the last several millions of years in the Bering Sea region, based on data from a genome of a historical specimen of this species, is published by Sharko et al. (2021), who interpret their findings as indicating that this species began to go extinct along the North Pacific coastline before the arrival of the first Paleolithic hunter-gatherers in the Beringia; however, Campos et al. (2022) subsequently argued that the population of the Steller's sea cow including the specimen studied by Sharko et al. might not accurately represent the demographic history of the entire species across its former geographic distribution.

=== Other afrotherians ===
==== Miscellaneous afrotherian research ====
- Revision of the fossil material of hyracoids from the Oligocene Malembo locality (Angola) is published by Tabuce et al. (2021).

== Euarchontoglires ==
=== Lagomorpha ===
Name	Novelty	Status	Authors	Age	Type locality	Country	Notes	Images
Alloptox gudrunae	Sp. nov	Valid	Erbajeva & Bayarmaa	Early Miocene		Mongolia	A pika.	

=== Primates ===
Name	Novelty	Status	Authors	Age	Type locality	Country	Notes	Images
Homo bodoensis	Nom. nov	Uncertain	Roksandic et al.	Middle Pleistocene	Bodo D'ar in Afar	Ethiopia	A species of Homo closely related to Homo sapiens. The validity of the new species name has been questioned.	Homo bodoensis
Homo longi	Sp. nov	Valid	Ji & Ni in Ji et al.	Middle Pleistocene	Upper Huangshan Formation	China	A species of Homo closely related to Homo sapiens.	Homo longi
Micropithecus chamtwaraensis	Sp. nov	Valid	Pickford et al.	Miocene	Chamtwara Formation	Kenya	A member of the family Dendropithecidae.	
Pronycticebus cosensis	Sp. nov	In press	Godinot & Vidalenc in Godinot et al.	Eocene	Cos, near Caylus (Quercy)	France	A cercamoniine adapiform.	
Protoadapis andrei	Sp. nov	In press	Godinot & Vidalenc in Godinot et al.	Eocene	Cos, near Caylus (Quercy)	France	A cercamoniine adapiform.	
Quercyloris	Gen. et sp. nov	In press	Godinot & Vidalenc in Godinot et al.	Eocene		France	A member of the family Microchoeridae. Genus includes new species Q. eloisae.	
Simonsius harujensis	Sp. nov	Valid	Mattingly et al.	Early Oligocene		Libya	A parapithecine.	

==== General primate research ====
- A study on tooth morphology and probable diet of extinct strepsirrhines is published by Fulwood et al. (2021).
- A study on the changes in teeth and dentary shape through time in notharctines from the Eocene Willwood Formation (Wyoming, United States) is published by O'Leary (2021).
- A study on the evolution of dietary adaptations in the teeth of lemuriforms, based on data from fossil primates, extant strepsirrhines and recently extinct lemurs, is published by Fulwood et al. (2021).
- Marciniak et al. (2021) present a nuclear genome sequence of Megaladapis edwardsi, and evaluate the implications of their findings for the knowledge of the phylogenetic relationships of this species and its possible diet-related adaptations.
- A study on dietary niches of Miocene colobines Mesopithecus delsoni and M. pentelicus in southeastern Europe is published by Thiery et al. (2021).
- A study on the variations of the graminivorous behavior in fossil members of the genus Theropithecus, and on its probable impact on the evolution and extinction of these monkeys, is published by Fannin et al. (2021).
- DeMiguel et al. (2021) present a reconstruction of the local climate and environments through the densely sampled primate-bearing sequence of Abocador de Can Mata (Spain), and attempt to determine whether turnovers in Miocene primate assemblages from this sequence were correlated with environmental changes.
- Arias-Martorell et al. (2021) describe the first known postcranial specimen of Barberapithecus huerzeleri (a proximal radius) from the late Miocene of Castell de Barberà (Spain), and evaluate the implications of its anatomy for the knowledge of the locomotion of B. huerzeleri.
- A study on the morphology of the semicircular canals of the bony labyrinth of Epipliopithecus vindobonensis, and on its implications for the knowledge of the phylogenetic relationships of this species, is published by Urciuoli et al. (2021).
- A study on the orientation, proportions, and course of the carotid canal in Pliobates cataloniae, and on its implications for the knowledge of the ancestral carotid canal course in main anthropoid clades, is published by Bouchet et al. (2021).
- A study on the inner ear morphology and phylogenetic relationships of Hispanopithecus and Rudapithecus is published by Urciuoli et al. (2021).
- A study on the diversity of the Miocene dryopithecines from the Iberian Peninsula, as indicated by morphology of their molars, is published by Fortuny et al. (2021).
- A study on the mandibular shape variation and the degree of mandibular sexual size dimorphism in Ouranopithecus macedoniensis is published by Ioannidou et al. (2021).
- New femoral remains of Nacholapithecus kerioi are described by Pina et al. (2021), who evaluate the implications of these fossils for the knowledge of the distinctiveness of the femur of Nacholapithecus when compared with other Miocene and extant apes, and for the knowledge of the within-species anatomical variation and locomotion of this ape.
- A study on the age of putative hominin Trachilos footprints from Crete (Greece) is published by Kirscher et al. (2021).
- A study on the feeding ecology of Gigantopithecus blacki in Guangxi (China) during the earliest Pleistocene is published by Jiang et al. (2021).
- A study on the evolutionary history of the African hominid oral microbiome, based on data from dental biofilms of Late Pleistocene to present-day modern humans, Neanderthals and nonhuman primates, is published by Fellows Yates et al. (2021).

==== General paleoanthropology ====
- A study on the evolution of the efficiency of thumb opposition in fossil hominins is published by Karakostis et al. (2021).
- A study on the evolutionary history of hominins and the evolution of body mass and encephalization in hominins is published by Püschel et al. (2021), who estimate that the origin of the genus Homo probably occurred between 4.30 and 2.56 million years ago.
- A study on footprints of bipedal mammals from Laetoli site A (Tanzania) is published by McNutt et al. (2021), who interpret these footprints as most likely produced by bipedal hominins, but also find them distinct from hominin footprints from Laetoli site G, and interpret them as evidence of presence of at least two hominin taxa at Laetoli, including a hominin with a distinct and presumably more primitive foot than Australopithecus afarensis.
- A study on the evolution of the hominin hand, with a focus on the hand of Ardipithecus ramidus, is published by Prang et al. (2021), who report that the hand morphology of A. ramidus was more closely aligned with chimpanzees and bonobos than generalized quadrupeds, and interpret their findings as indicating that hominins evolved from an ancestor with a positional repertoire including suspension, vertical climbing, and possibly knuckle walking.
- A study on the canine size dimorphism in Ardipithecus ramidus, interpreted as weak, comparable to that of modern humans, and significantly weaker than in the bonobo (the least dimorphic among extant great apes), is published by Suwa et al. (2021), who interpret this finding as evidence of abehavioral shift associated with comparatively weak levels of male aggression early in human evolution.
- A study on the age of the earliest deposits from the Swartkrans Cave (South Africa) is published by Kuman et al. (2021), who identify these deposits as containing the earliest known Oldowan stone tools and fossils of Paranthropus robustus in South Africa.
- A study comparing prevalence and patterns of tooth chipping in Paranthropus robustus and other extinct and extant primates is published by Towle, Irish & Loch (2021), who report that P. robustus experienced fewer tooth enamel chips than other hominin species and extant primates consuming hard objects, and interpret their findings as not corroborating that P. robustus regularly masticated hard foods.
- A bone tool is described from the Pleistocene site of Cooper's D (South Africa) by Hanon et al. (2021), who argue that this finding supports the interpretation of Paranthropus robustus as having the cognitive and manipulative abilities to develop and implement bone tools.
- Evidence of meat consumption by Early Pleistocene hominins is reported from the Cooper's D site by Hanon et al. (2021).
- A study on the skull of the Australopithecus specimen StW 573 ("Little Foot"), aiming to identify and assess the degree of preservation of craniodental microstructures that could contribute to the reconstruction of Australopithecus' biology, is published by Beaudet et al. (2021).
- A study on the anatomy of the shoulder girdle of the specimen StW 573, and on its implications for the knowledge of the evolution of the shoulder in hominins, is published by Carlson et al. (2021).
- Reconstruction of the environment at Allia Bay locality (Kenya) ca. 3.97 Ma, based on data from bovid fossils, is published by Dumouchel et al. (2021), who evaluate the implications of their findings for the knowledge of the range of environments occupied by Australopithecus anamensis.
- A study comparing upper and lower limb joint proportions of multiple species of Australopithecus, Paranthropus and Homo is published by Prabhat et al. (2021), who interpret their findings as indicating that, unlike other species of Australopithecus, A. afarensis was a committed terrestrial biped, and that this species evolved adaptations in limb joint proportions characteristic of bipedal locomotion independently of later Pleistocene hominins.
- A study on the biomechanical performance of the molars of Paranthropus robustus and Australopithecus africanus, and on likely dietary ecologies of these hominins, is published by Berthaume & Kupczik (2021).
- A study comparing the sacrum of the small-bodied, presumed female subadult Australopithecus africanus skeleton STS 14 to the large, alleged male adult StW 431 and a geographically diverse sample of modern humans and apes is published by Fornai et al. (2021), who interpret the morphological differences between the studied fossils as most likely to be the result of the presence of more than one species of Australopithecus at Sterkfontein Member 4.
- Vertebrae constituting near-complete lower back of Australopithecus sediba are described from Malapa (South Africa) by Williams et al. (2021), who interpret this finding as indicating that this hominin possessed a lower back consistent with lumbar lordosis and other adaptations to bipedalism, and that A. sediba used its lower back in both bipedal and arboreal positional behaviors.
- A study aiming to determine potential differences in cochlear morphology among fossil hominin taxa from southern Africa is published by Braga et al. (2021).
- A study on the speciation patterns in Pleistocene hominins, aiming to determine the phylogeographic patterns underlying the spread and morphological divergence of Pleistocene Homo populations, is published by Parins-Fukuchi (2021).
- A study on the adaptability of hominins living two million years ago to unstable environments, based on data from the Ewass Oldupa site (Olduvai Gorge, Tanzania), is published by Mercader et al. (2021).
- A study on the patterning and intensity of cut marks on animal bones from anthropogenic sites from Olduvai Gorge, and on their implications for the knowledge of carcass acquisition strategies of early Pleistocene hominins, is published by Domínguez-Rodrigo et al. (2021), who interpret their findings as invalidating hypotheses positing that carcasses of animals killed by other carnivores constituted a significant part of the diet of these hominins, and evaluate the impact of the adoption of carnivory by early members of the genus Homo on hominin evolution.
- A study on a partial mandible of an infant of an early member of the genus Homo from the Garba IV site of the Melka Kunture complex (Ethiopia) is published Le Cabec et al. (2021), who argue that their findings refute the interpretation of this individual as affected by amelogenesis imperfecta.
- The first dated Acheulean site from the Nefud Desert of northern Arabia is reported by Scerri et al. (2021).
- Groucutt et al. (2021) report multiple palaeolake sedimentary sequences with associated stone tool assemblages and fossil fauna from the Nefud Desert, and interpret their findings as evidence of at least five dispersals of hominins into the Arabian interior between 400 and 55 thousand years ago.
- A study aiming to reconstruct the trophic level of the Homo lineage that likely led to modern humans during the Pleistocene is published by Ben-Dor, Sirtoli & Barkai (2021).
- A study on the origins of the structurally modern human brain, based on data from endocasts of early members of the genus Homo from Africa, Georgia and Southeast Asia, is published by Ponce de León et al. (2021).
- A study aiming to determine the influence of environmental factors on the evolution of body and brain size of members of the genus Homo over the past ~1 million years is published by Will et al. (2021).
- A study on the feeding biomechanics of the holotype skull of Homo floresiensis is published by Cook et al. (2021).
- A study on the variation of the shape of the occipital and frontal bones in Homo erectus and Homo sapiens, aiming to assesses the hypothesis that similar evolutionary factors related to shared evolutionary history shaped cranial morphology in these species, is published by Baab (2021).
- A study on the ontogenetic development of the cranial vault in Homo erectus, aiming to determine whether the 1.5-Myr-old hominin calvaria KNM-ER 42700 from Ileret (Kenya) might be a juvenile H. erectus, is published by Baab et al. (2021).
- Hammond et al. (2021) trace the original location of the skull fragment KNM-ER 2598 (one of the oldest fossils attributed to Homo erectus) from East Turkana (Kenya), and describe additional hominin fossils which may represent the earliest postcrania attributable to H. erectus.
- A study on the affinities of two Early Pleistocene hominin fossils from Gona, Ethiopia is published by Baab et al. (2021), who interpret the studied fossils as the smallest adult H. erectus known from their respective time periods in Africa, and attempt to determine the causes of the differences in size and robusticity of the studied specimens.
- Dusseldorp & Lombard (2021) develop a framework to differentiate the technological niches of co-existing hominin species, and apply this framework to the coexistence of Homo naledi and Homo sapiens during the late Middle Pleistocene in southern Africa.
- Irish & Grabowski (2021) compare relative tooth size in Homo naledi and other Plio-Pleistocene and extant hominids, and evaluate its implications for the knowledge of the phylogenetic placement of H. naledi and dental evolutionary trends in hominins.
- Brophy et al. (2021) describe six hominin teeth and 28 cranial fragments from a new locality in the Dinaledi Subsystem of the Rising Star Cave system (South Africa), interpreted as consistent with a single immature individual belonging to the species Homo naledi and the first immature individual of this species preserving morphological details of the calvaria in association with dental evidence, and evaluate the implications of this finding for the knowledge of the maturation of H. naledi.
- Hershkovitz et al. (2021) report the discovery of fossils of archaic members of the genus Homo from the site of Nesher Ramla (Israel), possessing a distinctive combination of Neanderthal and archaic features, and interpret these fossils as likely representing late-surviving populations of Middle Pleistocene members of the genus Homo; a study on the age of this site (dated to 140,000 to 120,000 years ago) and on stone tool assemblages associated with these fossils is published by Zaidner et al. (2021), who report that Middle Pleistocene members of the genus Homo mastered stone-tool production technologies previously known only among Homo sapiens and Neanderthals, and interpret this finding as indicative of cultural interactions between populations of Homo sapiens and Middle Pleistocene Homo. The study of Hershkovitz et al. (2021) is subsequently criticized by Marom & Rak (2021), who argue that the Nesher Ramla hominin is more likely to be a Neanderthal.
- A study on the morphology and development of the scapulae in Homo antecessor individuals from the Gran Dolina site (Spain) is published by García-Martínez, Green & Bermúdez de Castro (2021).
- A study on the anatomy of the nasal region of hominins from the Sima de los Huesos site (Spain), and on it implications for the knowledge of the evolution of the nasal region of humans, is published by Schwartz, Pantoja-Pérez & Arsuaga (2021).
- Studies on the anatomy of teeth of hominins from the Sima de los Huesos site, and on its implications for the knowledge of the affinities of these hominins and the settlement of Europe during the Middle Pleistocene, are published by Bermúdez de Castro et al. (2021).
- A study on the variation in the supraorbital and orbital region of the Middle Pleistocene hominins, aiming to determine whether it matched the expectations of intraspecific variation, is published by White et al. (2021).
- New fossil material of Denisovans, associated with a wealth of lithics and faunal remains and representing the oldest securely dated evidence of Denisovans, is reported from the Denisova Cave (Russia) by Brown et al. (2021), who evaluate the implications of this finding for the knowledge of the material culture associated with Denisovans and their behavioural and environmental adaptations.
- Evidence of widespread Denisovan ancestry in contemporary human populations from Island Southeast Asia is presented by Teixeira et al. (2021), who find no evidence of substantial archaic hominin admixture compatible with known endemic hominins from Island Southeast Asia (Homo floresiensis and Homo luzonensis).
- A study on the stratigraphic position and absolute age of the Steinheim skull is published by Bloos (2021).
- McGrath et al. (2021) describe a method to create high-resolution 3D models of the tooth enamel surface using confocal profilometry, apply it to a sample of 17 Neanderthal and 18 Homo sapiens anterior teeth, and report evidence indicative of faster growth rates of anterior teeth in Neanderthals than in H. sapiens, as well as evidence that ratios of severity of linear enamel hypoplasia are not significantly different in Neanderthal sample and in H. sapiens sample as a whole.
- A study on the mobility patterns of Neanderthals and modern humans in Europe during the Middle-to-Upper Palaeolithic transition period, based on data from teeth from the Fumane Cave (Italy), is published by Richards et al. (2021).
- A study on the sound power transmission through the outer and middle ear and on the occupied bandwidth in Neanderthals is published by Conde-Valverde et al. (2021), who interpret their findings as indicating that the auditory and speech capacities of Neanderthals were similar to those in Homo sapiens.
- A study aiming to determine the factor which influenced the distinctive anatomy of the Neanderthal talus is published by Sorrentino et al. (2021).
- A study on the population history of Neanderthals, based on data from nuclear DNA from cave deposits in western Europe and southern Siberia dated to between approximately 200,000 and 50,000 years ago, is published by Vernot et al. (2021), who report evidence of two radiation events in Neanderthal history during the early part of the Late Pleistocene, and evidence of a population replacement in northern Spain approximately 100,000 years ago.
- Evidence of a contraction and shift of the ecological niche of culturally cohesive Neanderthal populations in Western Europe approximately 70,000 years ago is presented by Banks et al. (2021).
- A study on the fossil and archaeological collections from the Shuqba Cave is published by Blinkhorn et al. (2021), who interpret the hominin tooth from this site as the southernmost known Neanderthal fossil known to date, and interpret the site as the first direct association between Neanderthals and Nubian Levallois technology, demonstrating that this technology is not an exclusive marker of Homo sapiens; their conclusions are subsequently contested by Hallinan et al. (2022).
- Roebroeks et al. (2021) present paleoenvironmental and archaeological data from the Eemian locality of Neumark-Nord (Germany), interpreted as indicative of environmental impact by Neanderthals.
- A study on the prenatal and early postnatal growth of deciduous teeth of Neanderthals from Krapina (Croatia) is published by Mahoney et al. (2021).
- Leder et al. (2021) report the discovery of an at least 51,000-year-old engraved giant deer phalanx from the Unicorn Cave (Germany), and interpret this finding as evidence of presence of conceptual imagination in Neanderthals.
- Rothschild & Haeusler (2021) diagnose the Neanderthal skeleton La Chapelle-aux-Saints 1 as likely affected by brucellosis, making it the oldest known record of this disease in hominin evolution.
- A study on putative paintings on a large speleothem from the Cueva de Ardales (Spain) is published by Pitarch Martí et al. (2021), who interpret their findings as supporting the interpretation of the putative paintings were not the result of natural processes but rather were produced by Neanderthals, indicating that the pigments used in the paintings do not come from the outcrops of colorant material known in the cave, and indicating that the artistic activity occurred over an extended time span.
- A study on the age of the Neanderthal material from Spy (Belgium), and on its implications for the knowledge of the timing of Neanderthal disappearance from Northwest Europe, is published by Devièse et al. (2021); the study is subsequently criticized by Van Peer (2021).
- A study on the diet of members of eastern Neanderthal populations from the Chagyrskaya Cave (Altai Mountains, Russia), based on data from carbon and nitrogen stable isotopes from bone collagen and microbotanical remains in dental calculus, is published by Salazar-García et al. (2021).
- A review of the knowledge of the origins of modern human ancestry is published by Bergström et al. (2021).
- A study on the age of the Middle and Later Stone Age artifacts and fossils from the Halibee member of the Upper Dawaitoli Formation (Middle Awash, Ethiopia) is published by Niespolo et al. (2021).
- Wilkins et al. (2021) present evidence from a rockshelter deposit in the southern Kalahari Basin indicative of intentional collection of non-utilitarian objects (calcite crystals) and ostrich eggshell by people living in the interior of southern Africa approximately 105,000 years ago.
- Bone tools dated to 120,000 to 90,000 years ago, including tools likely used for leather and fur working, and found in association with carnivore remains that were possibly skinned for fur, are described from the Contrebandiers Cave (Morocco) by Hallett et al. (2021).
- Partial skeleton of a roughly 2.5- to 3.0-year-old child dating to around 78,000 years ago is described from the Middle Stone Age deposits of the Panga ya Saidi cave site (Kenya) by Martinón-Torres et al. (2021), who interpret this finding as the oldest human burial in Africa reported to date.
- A study on ostrich eggshell bead variations in eastern and southern Africa over the past 50,000 years, and their relationships to population connections in Africa and their associations with climate changes, is published by Miller & Wang (2021).
- Genome-wide data from three individuals found in direct association with an Initial Upper Paleolithic assemblage of artefacts in Bacho Kiro cave (Bulgaria) is studied by Hajdinjak et al. (2021), who interpret their findings as indicating that the studied individuals belonged to a modern human migration into Europe that was not previously known from the genetic record, and that all three individuals had Neanderthal ancestors a few generations back in their family history.
- A study on local seasonal temperatures in the area of the Bacho Kiro cave in the Initial Upper Paleolithic, and on its implications for the knowledge whether early presence of Homo sapiens in Europe was contingent on warm climates, is published by Pederzani et al. (2021).
- A study on genome sequences generated from ~45,000 years old skull of a woman from Zlatý kůň (Czech Republic) is published by Prüfer et al. (2021), who interpret this individual as likely to be one of the earliest Eurasian inhabitants following the expansion out of modern humans of Africa, probably belonging to a population that formed before the populations that gave rise to present-day Europeans and Asians split from one another.
- Svensson et al. (2021) sequence the genome of a woman from Peștera Muierilor (Romania) who lived ~34,000 years ago, and interpret their findings as indicating that this woman belonged to a group that was a side branch to the ancestor of modern-day Europeans, as well as indicating that the genetic diversity in the populations of early anatomically modern humans in Europe was higher than previously assumed, and argue that the bottlenecks associated with loss of genetic diversity in non-Africans occurred during and after the Last Glacial Maximum rather than during the out-of-Africa migration.
- A study on human footprints from the Grotte de Cussac (France) is published by Ledoux et al. (2021), who interpret their findings as indicating that Gravettian people most likely wore footwear while moving through that cave.
- A study aiming to assess climate adaptations in face anatomy of Upper Paleolithic humans from Mladeč and Sungir is published by Stansfield et al. (2021).
- A study on the age of putative early remains of anatomically modern humans from caves in southern China is published by Sun et al. (2021), who interpret these fossils as much more recent than previously suggested, and argue that anatomically modern humans settled southern China no earlier than ca. 50 to 45 ka; the study is subsequently criticized by Martinón-Torres et al. (2021) and Higham & Douka (2021).
- A study on environmental changes in Southeast Asia at the time of the Pleistocene turnovers of hominin species culminating with the arrival of Homo sapiens in the area, based on data from mammal fossils from five faunas from Vietnam and Laos whose ages ranged from MIS 6–5 to MIS 3–2, and aiming to determine how the climate changes that occurred during the Late Pleistocene might have influenced the adaptation of the first H. sapiens in the area, is published by Bacon et al. (2021).
- Two Late Pleistocene figurative paintings of Celebes warty pigs are reported from Maros-Pangkep (South Sulawesi, Indonesia) by Brumm et al. (2021), who determine the minimum age of one these paintings as at least 45.5 ka, making it likely one of the oldest if not the oldest record of the presence of anatomically modern humans in Wallacea, as well as the earliest known figurative artwork.
- Brumm et al. (2021) describe the first Pleistocene human skeletal remains from Sulawesi, dated to between 25 and 16 ka.
- A study on the ages of 16 motifs from the earliest known phase of rock paintings in the Australian Kimberley region is published by Finch et al. (2021).
- Human footprints dated to about 23,000 to 21,000 years ago are described from the White Sands National Park (New Mexico, United States) by Bennett et al. (2021); their conclusions about the age of the studied footprints are subsequently contested by Madsen et al. (2022).
- A study aiming to evaluate whether Clovis fluted points were efficient weapon tips for hunting proboscideans is published by Eren et al. (2021).
- Evidence of human use of tobacco approximately 12,300 years ago is reported from the Wishbone site (Utah, United States) by Duke et al. (2021).
- Scerri et al. (2021) report two new sites in Senegal that date the end of the Middle Stone Age to around 11 ka, representing the youngest record of this cultural phase in Africa reported so far, and indicating that it persisted into the Holocene.
- Zhang et al. report what could be the discovery of the oldest rock art, likely dating back to ~169,000–226,000 years ago, much older than what was previously thought to be the earliest known drawing, made ~73,000 years ago. Children likely intentionally placed a series of hands and feet in mud. The findings could also be the earliest evidence of Hominins on the above 4000 meters a.s.l. high Tibetan Plateau.
- Uwe Kirscher et al. report an improved dating of the earliest hominin-like footprints which were found in Crete, Greece: they are ~6.05 million years old, which is around the time of Orrorin – the previously earliest theorized potential species of Homininae. The Trachilos footprints were first dated in 2017, were found outside of Africa and resulted from upright walking–but not necessarily of pre-human apes. However, already 11.6 million years ago Danuvius guggenmosi exhibited bipedalism in Germany.

=== Rodentia ===
Name	Novelty	Status	Authors	Age	Type locality	Country	Notes	Images
Aliveria mojmiri	Sp. nov	In press	Bonilla Salomón et al.	Early Miocene		Czech Republic	A flying squirrel.	
Asteromys puelche	Sp. nov	Valid	Candela et al.	Deseadan		Argentina	A member of Cavioidea.	
Auroremys	Gen. et comb. nov	In press	Vianey-Liaud & Marivaux	Eocene		France	A member of the family Pseudosciuridae. The type species is "Ailuravus" subita Comte et al. (2012).	
Balsayacuy	Gen. et sp. nov	In press	Boivin et al.	Eocene		Peru	A member of Caviomorpha. Genus includes new species B. huallagaensis.	
Batomys cagayanensis	Sp. nov	Valid	Ochoa et al.	Pleistocene		Philippines	A cloud rat, a species of Batomys.	
Caecocricetodon	Gen. et sp. nov	Valid	Lu, Ni & Maridet	Early Oligocene	Caijiachong Formation	China	A member of the family Cricetidae. The type species is C. yani.	
Caribeomys	Gen. et sp. nov	Valid	Marivaux et al.	Early Oligocene		United States (Puerto Rico)	A member of Geomorpha. Genus includes new species C. merzeraudi.	
Carpomys dakal	Sp. nov	Valid	Ochoa et al.	Pleistocene to late Holocene		Philippines	A cloud rat, a species of Carpomys.	
Chachapoyamys	Gen. et sp. nov	In press	Boivin et al.	Eocene		Peru	A member of Caviomorpha. Genus includes new species C. kathetos.	
Crateromys ballik	Sp. nov	Valid	Ochoa et al.	Pleistocene to late Holocene		Philippines	A cloud rat, a species of Crateromys.	
Ctenomys rusconii	Sp. nov	Valid	De Santi et al.	Early Pleistocene		Argentina	A tuco-tuco.	
Daxneria	Gen. et sp. nov	Valid	Van de Weerd, de Bruijn & Wessels	Late Oligocene	Kızılırmak, Güvendik	Turkey	A member of Hystricognathi belonging to the subfamily Baluchimyinae. The type species is D. fragilis.	
Eucricetodon oculatus	Sp. nov	Valid	Van de Weerd, de Bruijn & Wessels	Late Oligocene	Kızılırmak, Güvendik	Turkey	Originally described as a member of the family Muridae belonging to the subfamily Eucricetodontinae; subsequently transferred to the genus Dekamyarion within the family Spalacidae.	
Eucricetodon ruber	Sp. nov	Valid	Van de Weerd, de Bruijn & Wessels	Late Oligocene	Kızılırmak	Turkey	Originally described as a member of the family Muridae belonging to the subfamily Eucricetodontinae; subsequently transferred to the genus Dekamyarion within the family Spalacidae.	
Lophiomys imhausi maremortum	Subsp. nov	In press	Lazagabaster et al.	Late Pleistocene		Israel	A subspecies of the maned rat.	
Megalomys camerhogne	Sp. nov	Valid	Mistretta et al.	Holocene		Grenada	A species of Megalomys.	
Metacaremys	Gen. et comb. et 2 sp. nov	Valid	Piñero et al.	Late Miocene to Miocene-Pliocene boundary	Cerro Azul Formation	Argentina; Bolivia	A member of Octodontoidea related to the family Octodontidae. The type species is "Cercomys" primitiva; genus also includes new species M. calfucalel and M. dimi.	
Microscleromys	Gen. et 2 sp. nov	Valid	Boivin & Walton in Boivin et al.	Miocene (Laventan)	Villavieja Formation	Colombia; Peru	A member of Chinchilloidea. The type species is M. paradoxalis; genus also includes M. cribriphilus. Originally described in the framework of Anne H. Walton's Ph.D. thesis from 1990, but formally named in 2021.	
Microsteiromys	Gen. et sp. nov	Valid	Boivin & Walton in Boivin et al.	Miocene (Laventan)	Villavieja Formation	Colombia	A member of Erethizontoidea. The type species is M. jacobsi. Originally described in the framework of Anne H. Walton's Ph.D. thesis from 1990, but formally named in 2021.	
Miochinchilla	Gen. et 2 sp. nov	Valid	Croft et al.	Miocene		Bolivia; Chile	A member of the family Chinchillidae. Genus includes new species M. surirense and M. plurinacionalis.	
Myomimus tanjuae	Sp. nov	Valid	Bilgin et al.	Early Miocene		Turkey	A species of Myomimus.	
Noamys	Gen. et sp. nov	In press	Ercoli et al.	Late Miocene	Guanaco Formation	Argentina	A New World porcupine. Genus includes new species N. hypsodonta.	
Nuyuyomys	Gen. et sp. nov	Valid	Boivin & Walton in Boivin et al.	Miocene (Colloncuran-Laventan)		Peru	A member of Erethizontoidea. The type species is N. chinqaska.	
Pannoniamys	Gen. et sp. nov	Valid	Van de Weerd et al.	Late Oligocene		Serbia	A member of the family Spalacidae. The type species is P. paragovensis.	
Paralonchothrix	Gen. et comb. nov	Valid	Piñero et al.	Late Miocene	Loma de Las Tapias Formation	Argentina; Brazil	A member of the tribe Echimyini. Genus includes "Eumysops" ponderosus Rovereto (1914).	
Qatranimys	Gen. et sp. nov	Valid	Al-Ashqar et al.	Late Eocene	Jebel Qatrani Formation	Egypt	A member of Phiomorpha belonging to the subfamily Phiocricetomyinae. The type species is Q. safroutus.	
Reinomys	Gen. et sp. nov	In press	Vianey-Liaud & Marivaux	Eocene		France	A basal member of Theridomorpha. The type species is R. rhomboides.	
Ricardomys	Gen. et sp. nov	Valid	Boivin & Walton in Boivin et al.	Miocene (Laventan)	Villavieja Formation	Colombia; Peru	A member of Octodontoidea belonging to the family Adelphomyidae. The type species is R. longidens. Originally described in the framework of Anne H. Walton's Ph.D. thesis from 1990, but formally named in 2021.	
Typhlomys stegodontis	Sp. nov	Valid	Lopatin	Pleistocene		Vietnam	A member of the family Platacanthomyidae.	
Yuomys robustus	Sp. nov	Valid	Gong, Li & Ni	Late Eocene		China	A member of Ctenodactyloidea.	

==== Rodent research ====
- New postcranial material of ischyromyids is described from the Erlian Basin (Inner Mongolia, China) by Fostowicz-Frelik, López-Torres & Li (2021), who interpret these fossils as indicative of a greater species richness of this group in northern China during the middle Eocene than was previously suggested by fossil teeth, as well as indicative of different paleoecology of Asian and North American ischyromyids.
- Description of the fossil material of dormice from the Oligocene localities of St-Martin-de-Castillon C (France) and Montalbán 1D (Spain), and a study on the phylogenetic relationships of extant and fossil dormice, is published by Lu et al. (2021).
- A study on changes in the brain over time, across phylogeny, and associated with locomotor behaviour in extant and fossil squirrels, aplodontiids and their close relatives is published by Bertrand et al. (2021).
- A study on the anatomy of the skull of Csakvaromys bredai, and on its implications for the knowledge of the evolution of ground squirrels, is published by Sinitsa, Čermák & Kryuchkova (2021).
- Redescription of "Orthomyctera" chapalmalense is published by Madozzo-Jaén, Pérez & Deschamps (2021), who transfer this species to the genus Dolichotis.
- A study on the anatomy of the postcranial skeleton of Neoepiblema, and on its implications for the knowledge of the paleobiology of this rodent, is published by Kerber et al. (2021).
- A study aiming to determine the ecological adaptation that allowed Trogontherium cuvieri to persist in northeast China in the Pleistocene, based on data from Early to Middle Pleistocene specimens from the Jinyuan Cave, is published by Yang et al. (2021).
- New fossil material of cricetodontine cricetids, providing evidence of the synonymy of the genera Lartetomys and Mixocricetodon, is described from the middle Miocene locality Höll (German part of the northern Alpine basin) by Prieto et al. (2021), who also study the evolution of the genus Lartetomys.
- Description of new fossil material of Olympicomys vossi from the Vorohué Formation (Argentina), and a study on the phylogenetic placement of this rodent, is published by Barbière et al. (2021).
- A study on the fossil record of the Miocene murine rodents from the Siwalik Group of Pakistan, evaluating its implications for the knowledge of the origin of the tribes Arvicanthini and Murini, is published by Kimura, Flynn & Jacobs (2021).
- A study on the phylogenetic affinities and evolutionary history of the Tenerife giant rat, as indicated by nuclear and mitochondrial data, is published by Renom et al. (2021).

== Laurasiatheria ==
=== Artiodactyla ===
==== Cetaceans ====
Name	Novelty	Status	Authors	Age	Type locality	Country	Notes	Images
Berardius kobayashii	Sp. nov	Valid	Kawatani & Kohno	Miocene	Tsurushi Formation	Japan	A beaked whale, a species of Berardius.	
Isoninia	Gen. et sp. nov	Valid	Godfrey, Gutstein & Morgan	Probably Miocene (Messinian)	Probably Eastover Formation	United States (North Carolina)	Possibly a member of the family Iniidae. The type species is I. borealis.	
Kennedycetus	Gen. et sp. nov	In press	Solis-Añorve et al.	Late Miocene	Trinidad Formation	Mexico	A member of Balaenopteroidea. Genus includes new species K. pericorum.	
Kentriodon sugawarai	Sp. nov	Valid	Guo & Kohno	Miocene	Kadonosawa Formation	Japan		
Kogia danomurai	Sp. nov	Valid	Benites-Palomino et al.	Late Miocene	Pisco Formation	Peru	A species of Kogia.	
Phiomicetus	Gen. et sp. nov	Valid	Gohar et al.	Eocene (Lutetian)	Midawara Formation	Egypt	A protocetid. Genus includes new species P. anubis.	
Pliodelphis	Gen. et sp. nov	Valid	Belluzzo & Lambert	Pliocene (Zanclean)	Kattendijk Sands	Belgium	An oceanic dolphin. The type species is P. doelensis.	

===== Cetacean research =====
- A study on the effects of incorporation of fossil taxa for inferences about phylogenetic relationships and evolutionary history of cetaceans is published by Lloyd & Slater (2021).
- A study on the evolution of the cetacean brain size is published by Waugh & Thewissen (2021).
- Kassegne et al. (2021) report the first discovery of a partial cetacean skull from middle Eocene deposits of Togo, identified as belonging to a protocetid close to Togocetus, and evaluate the implications of this specimen for the knowledge of the protocetid diversity in the Togolese phosphate basin.
- A tooth a possible member of the family Remingtonocetidae, potentially extending the range of this family across the Atlantic to eastern North America, is described from the Eocene of North Carolina by Uhen & Peredo (2021).
- Redescription of the Eocene cetacean "Platyosphys einori" is published by Davydenko et al. (2021), who interpret this taxon as a basilosaurid of uncertain phylogenetic placement, and report that it shows adaptations to life in water typical for modern whales but unique for the Eocene cetaceans.
- Revision of the stratigraphic, biogeographic and environmental distribution of Basilosaurus in North America is published by Smith et al. (2021).
- A study on the internal neurovascular anatomy of the holotype skull of Aetiocetus weltoni, and on its implications for the knowledge of the teeth to baleen transition in cetaceans, is published by Ekdale & Deméré (2022).
- Two partial skulls of members of the family Eurhinodelphinidae are described from the Miocene (Burdigalian) Chilcatay Formation (Pisco Basin, Peru) by Lambert et al. (2021), representing the first diagnostic remains attributable to this family reported from the Southern Hemisphere and the Pacific Ocean.
- New fossil material of Xiphiacetus cristatus is described from the Tortonian Diest Formation (Belgium) by Lambert & Goolaerts (2021), providing evidence of the survival of hyper-longirostrine dolphins into the early late Miocene.
- Partial skull of a member of the stem group of Delphinida is described from the Caujarao Formation (Venezuela) by Benites-Palomino et al. (2021), providing evidence that stem delphinidans were present in the southern Caribbean region during the early late Miocene.
- A study on the anatomy and evolution of the inner ear of late Oligocene–early Miocene marine platanistoids is published by Viglino et al. (2021).
- Redescription and revision of the taxonomic status of Preaulophyseter gualichensis is published by Paolucci et al. (2021).
- A study on the bite force of Zygophyseter varolai is published by Peri et al. (2021).
- Description of a new diminutive partial skull of a member of the genus Thalassocetus from the Miocene (Tortonian) of Antwerp (Belgium), providing new information on the facial morphology of this cetacean, and a study on the phylogenetic relationships of Thalassocetus is published by Alfsen, Bosselaers & Lambert (2021).
- A study on the evolution of the brain in cetaceans, based on data from fossils of baleen whales, is published by Mccurry et al. (2021).
- A study on the evolution of the length and mass in balaenids, based on data from extant and fossil taxa, is published by Bisconti, Pellegrino & Carnevale (2021).
- Partial mandible of an unequivocal member of the family Cetotheriidae is described from the upper Miocene Arenaria di Ponsano Formation (Italy) by Collareta et al. (2021), who evaluate the implications of this finding for the knowledge of the presence of cetotheriids in the Mediterranean.
- Bisconti et al. (2021) reconstruct virtual endocast of Marzanoptera tersillae, and interpret their findings as indicative of exceptionally high encephalization in this baleen whale.
- Two partial specimens of Cryptolepas rhachianecti, a barnacle known only to inhabit the skin of gray whales, are described from the Pleistocene-aged sediments from the Canoa Basin (Ecuador) by Taylor, Abella & Morales-Saldaña (2021), who interpret this finding as the first known evidence of a gray whale population having resided within the South Pacific.
- Revision of the fossil material assigned to the genus Plesiocetus by Pierre-Joseph van Beneden in the 19th century is published by Bisconti & Bosselaers (201).

==== Other artiodactyls ====
Name	Novelty	Status	Authors	Age	Type locality	Country	Notes	Images
Amphimoschus xishuiensis	Sp. nov	Valid	Li et al.	Miocene	Tiejianggou Formation	China	A member of Bovoidea. Originally described as a species of Amphimoschus, but subsequently made the type species of the separate genus Dimidiomeryx by Sánchez et al. (2024).	
Chiyoumeryx	Gen. et comb. et sp. nov	Valid	Mennecart et al.	Late Eocene	Shinao Formation	China; Kazakhstan?	A ruminant belonging to the group Tragulina and the family Lophiomerycidae. The type species is "Lophiomeryx" shinaoensis Miao (1982); genus also includes new species C. flavimperatoris, and possibly also "Lophiomeryx" turgaicus Flerow (1938).	
Colbertchoerus	Gen. et comb. nov	Valid	Prothero	Late Barstovian-early Clarendonian	Calvert Formation; Choptank Formation; Valentine Formation	United States (Colorado; Maryland; Nebraska)	A peccary. The type species is "Prosthennops" niobrarense Colbert (1935).	
Erlianhyus	Gen. et sp. nov	In press	Li & Li	Eocene	Irdin Manha Formation	China	An even-toed ungulate positioned outside of the anthracotheriid-suoid-dichobunoid clade. Genus includes new species E. primitivus.	
Etruscotherium	Gen. et sp. nov	In press	Pickford	Miocene (Turolian)		Italy	An anthracothere. Genus includes new species E. ribollaense.	
Gangraia	Gen. et sp. nov	Valid	Kostopoulos et al.	Late Miocene	Tüglu Formation	Turkey	A member of the family Bovidae belonging to the subfamily Antilopinae. The type species is G. anatolica.	
Geniokeryx nanus	Sp. nov	In press	Ducrocq et al.	Late Eocene	Krabi Basin	Thailand	An anthracothere.	
Iberomeryx miaoi	Sp. nov	Valid	Mennecart et al.	Late Eocene	Shinao Formation	China	A chevrotain.	
Mckennahyus	Gen. et sp. nov	Valid	Prothero	Middle Clarendonian	Ash Hollow Formation	United States (Nebraska)	A peccary. The type species is M. parisidutrai.	
Praesinomegaceros bakri	Sp. nov	In press	Croitor et al.	Early Pleistocene		Pakistan	A deer.	
Rajouria	Gen. et sp. nov	In press	Rana et al.	Middle Eocene	Subathu Group	India	A member of the family Raoellidae. Genus includes new species R. gunnelli.	
Stirtonhyus	Gen. et comb. nov	Valid	Prothero	Early through early late Barstovian	Calvert Formation; Fleming Formation; Olcott Formation; Pawnee Creek Beds; Torreya Formation; Valentine Formation	United States (Colorado; Florida; Maryland; Nebraska; Texas)	A peccary. The type species is "Prosthennops" xiphidonticus Barbour (1925).	
Tedfordhyus	Gen. et comb. nov	Valid	Prothero	Early Hemingfordian to late Barstovian	Barstow Formation; Caliente Formation; Temblor Formation	Panama; United States (California)	A peccary. The type species is "Cynorca" occidentale Woodburne (1969).	
Webbochoerus	Gen. et sp. nov	Valid	Prothero	Late Clarendonian	Love Bone Bed	United States (Florida)	A peccary. The type species is W. macfaddeni.	

===== Other artiodactyl research =====
- A study on the diversity dynamics of cainotherioids through time is published by Weppe et al. (2021).
- A study on the basicranial morphology of Protoceras celer is published by Robson, Seale & Theodor (2021), who interpret their findings as indicating that protoceratid basicrania (unlike other regions of their skull) did not undergo drastic changes during their evolution.
- New fossil material of Paracamelus aguirrei is described from the Miocene locality Venta del Moro (Spain) by Caballero et al. (2021), who interpret P. aguirrei as a large camelid, comparable in size to Megacamelus merriami, Paracamelus gigas and Camelus knoblochi.
- A study on the taxonomic status of Selenogonus narinoensis is published by Gasparini, Moreno-Mancilla & Cómbita (2021), who interpret the holotype of this species as a specimen of Platygonus marplatensis or a related species, representing one of the northernmost South American records of the genus, and possibly one of the most ancient records of peccaries in South America.
- Cucchi et al. (2021) identify an insular lineage of wild boars from the Pre-Pottery Neolithic sites of Klimonas and Shillourokambos, originating from the Northern Levant and inhabiting Cyprus 11,000 to 9000 calibrated years BP, representing the oldest known population of insular ungulates introduced by humans in the Mediterranean Basin.
- A study aiming to determine whether the "law of constant extinction" proposed by Leigh Van Valen (stating that long and short-lived taxa have equal chances of going extinct) applies to the ruminants, taking the inherent biases of the fossil record into account, is published by Januario & Quental (2021).
- A study on the tooth wear and hypsodonty in ruminants from the early and middle Miocene of Kenya and Uganda, and on its implications for the knowledge of the ecological preferences of these ruminants, is published by Hall & Cote (2021).
- Description of new fossil material of Nalameryx savagei from the Oligocene Kargil Formation (India), and a study on the phylogenetic affinities of this ungulate, is published by Mennecart et al. (2021).
- Review of the fossil material attributed to Amphimoschus, and a reassessment of the validity of the species assigned to this genus, is published by Mennecart et al. (2021).
- A study comparing the ontogenetic trends in the limb bones of Pleistocene pronghorns Capromeryx minor and Capromeryx arizonensis, aiming to determine how ontogenetic slopes compare to the slope of dwarfing, is published by Prothero et al. (2021).
- Description of the anatomy of the postcranial skeleton of Capromeryx minor is published by Prothero, de Anda & Balassa (2021).
- Description of new fossil teeth of Bramatherium grande from the Late Miocene of Pakistan, providing new information on the variability of dental morphology in Late Miocene sivatherine giraffids, and a study on the phylogenetic relationships of this species is published by Khan, Babar & Ríos (2021).
- The first possible occurrence of Sivatherium from western Europe is reported from the lower Pliocene of Puerto de la Cadena (Spain) by Ríos et al. (2021).
- A study on the phylogenetic relationships of extant and fossil bovids is published by Calamari (2021), who attempts to identify novel hard-tissue synapomorphies for Bovidae and its tribes in order to determine the relationships of fossil members of this family.
- Redescription of the holotype skull of a putative boselaphine Proboselaphus watasei is published by Nishioka, Kohno & Kudo (2021), who reinterpret it as a skull of the sambar deer or a related species of deer, and evaluate the implications of this reinterpretation for the knowledge of the evolutionary history of boselaphines.
- Revision of cervids from the Late Miocene of Europe included in the subfamily Pliocervinae is published by Croitor (2021).
- Redescription and revision of the taxonomy of cervid fossils from the João Cativo and Lage Grande sites in the Brazilian Intertropical Region is published by Rotti et al. (2021), who identify fossils of members of the genus Morenelaphus from these sites, and evaluate the implications of the presence of giant deer for reconstructions of the climate and environment of the Brazilian Intertropical Region during the Pleistocene.
- New skull material of Pleistocene dwarf deer belonging to the genus Candiacervus, providing new information on the anatomy and island adaptations of these deer, is described from Crete (Greece) by Schilling & Rössner (2021).
- A study on the histology of the bone tissue in the holotype and paratype specimens of Candiacervus major is published by Palombo & Zedda (2021), who interpret the studied bones as belonging to an individual affected by pituitary gigantism (representing the first case of pituitary gigantism in an extinct mammal reported to date), consider the species C. major to be possibly synonymous with C. dorothensis, and consider it unlikely to represent an endemic species of an extraordinary large-sized deer.
- A study on the population dynamics and demise of the Irish elk, based on data Late Pleistocene and Holocene mitogenomes, is published by Rey-Iglesia et al. (2021)
- Description of the anatomy of the holotype of the Irish elk, revision of its subspecies, and a study on its evolutionary history, biogeography and functional morphology of its antlers, is published by Croitor (2021).
- Revision of the Messinian fossil record of bovids from Italy, with a focus on fossils from the Monticino Quarry (Brisighella, central Italy), is published by Pandolfi, Masini & Kostopoulos (2021), who transfer the species "Samotragus" occidentalis to the genus Oioceros.
- Redescription of the anatomy of the skull of Hezhengia bohlini, and a revision of the phylogenetic relationships of the Chinese late Miocene "ovibovines", is published by Shi & Deng (2021).
- A study comparing intraspecific variation and changes in the anatomy of the horn core, dentition and skull of Hezhengia bohlini during ontogeny is published by Shi et al. (2021).
- A study on the ecomorphology of Rusingoryx atopocranion, and on its implications for reconstructions of the environment of the Lake Victoria Basin during the late Pleistocene, is published by Kovarovic et al. (2021).
- A study on the diet of members of the tribe Reduncini from the Shungura Formation (Ethiopia) is published by Blondel et al. (2021).
- An overview of the phylogeny and evolution of the Late Pleistocene and Holocene species of Bison, focusing on data from ancient DNA studies, is published by Zver, Toškan & Bužan (2021).
- Revision of the European fossil record of bisons, with a focus on the Early-Middle Pleistocene transition in general and on fossil sites from the Vallparadís Composite Section (Terrassa, NE Iberian Peninsula) in particular, is published by Sorbelli et al. (2021).
- A study on the bone microanatomy of extant and fossil members of Hippopotamoidea, and on its implications for the knowledge of the ecology of extinct hippopotamoids, is published by Houssaye et al. (2021).
- Ducrocq et al. (2021) report the first discovery of the lower teeth of Siamotherium pondaungensis from the Eocene Pondaung Formation (Myanmar).
- Revision of the fossil material of hippopotamids from the uppermost Miocene deposits of Gravitelli (Sicily, Italy), and a study on the implications of these fossils for the knowledge of the dispersal of hippopotamids into the Mediterranean area around the Mio-Pliocene transition, is published by Martino et al. (2021).
- The earliest record of Hippopotamus from the United Kingdom known to date (a tooth of a member or a relative of the species Hippopotamus antiquus) is reported from the Early Pleistocene mammal assemblage from Westbury Cave (Somerset) by Adams, Candy & Schreve (2021), who interpret this finding as likely evidence of a warm period that has not been recognized previously in the British Quaternary record.
- A study on the morphology of the carpal bones of the Cyprus dwarf hippopotamus, and on its implications for the knowledge of the locomotion of this hippopotamus, is published by Georgitsis, Liakopoulou & Theodorou (2021).
- A study on the phylogenetic affinities of the Cyprus dwarf hippopotamus, based on data from ancient DNA, is published by Psonis et al. (2021).
- Orliac & Thewissen (2021) describe the endocranial cast of Indohyus indirae, and evaluate its implications for the knowledge of the evolution of the anatomy of the cetacean brain.
- Revision of the fossil material of Sylvochoerus woodburnei, Waldochoerus bassleri and Surameryx acrensis is published by Gasparini et al. (2021), who consider the fossils of these ungulates to be more likely of Quaternary rather than Miocene age, reinterpret S. woodburnei and W. bassleri as junior synonyms of extant peccary species, and reinterpret S. acrensis as described on the basis of fossil material of a deer rather than a palaeomerycid.
- A study on the morphology of the basicranium and bony labyrinth of Leptoreodon major is published by Robson, Ludtke & Theodor (2021).

=== Carnivorans ===
Name	Novelty	Status	Authors	Age	Type locality	Country	Notes	Images
Ammitocyon	Gen. et sp. nov	Valid	Morales et al.	Late Miocene	Cerro de los Batallones	Spain	A bear dog. Genus includes new species A. kainos.	
Canis orcensis	Sp. nov	Valid	Martinez-Navarro et al.	Early Pleistocene		Spain	A species of Canis.	
Cynelos jitu	Sp. nov	Valid	Morlo et al.	Early Miocene	Bakate Formation	Kenya	A bear dog.	
Dehmicyon	Gen. et comb. nov	Valid	Morales et al.	Early Miocene		Czech Republic; Germany	A bear dog. The type species is "Amphicyon" schlosseri Dehm (1950).	
Dunictis	Gen. et comb. nov	Valid	Morales & Pickford	Early Miocene		Kenya; Namibia	A member of the family Viverridae. The type species is "Leptoplesictis" senutae Morales, Pickford & Salesa (2008); genus also includes "Leptoplesictis" rangwai Schmidt-Kittler (1987) and possibly also "Leptoplesictis" mbitensis Schmidt-Kittler (1987) and "Leptoplesictis" namibiensis Morales, Pickford & Salesa (2008).	
Eomellivora moralesi	Sp. nov	In press	Alba et al.	Miocene		Spain	A mellivorine mustelid.	
Eucyon khoikhoi	Sp. nov	Valid	Valenciano, Morales & Govender	Early Pliocene		South Africa		
Eusmilus adelos	Sp. nov	Valid	Paul Zachary Barrett	Early Oligocene	White River Formation	United States(Wyoming)	A nimravid.	
Forsythictis	Gen. et sp. et comb. nov	Valid	Morales & Pickford	Middle Miocene		France; Germany; Spain	A member of the family Viverridae. The type species is F. ibericus; genus also includes "Stenogale" aurelianensis Schlosser (1889) and "Herpestes (Leptoplesictis) aurelianensis" atavus Beaumont (1973; raised to the rank of a separate species F. atavus).	
Gansuyaena	Gen. et sp. nov	Valid	Galiano et al.	Miocene	Linxia Basin	China	A hyena belonging to the subfamily Protelinae. The type species is G. megalotis.	
Machairodus lahayishupup	Sp. nov	Valid	Orcutt & Calede	Miocene (Hemphillian)		United States (Idaho; Oregon)		
Magnotherium	Gen. et sp. nov	In press	Rahmat et al.	Late Miocene	St. Marys Formation	United States (Maryland)	A monachine earless seal. Genus includes new species M. johnsii.	
Oaxacagale	Gen. et sp. nov	In press	Ferrusquía-Villafranca & Wang	Paleogene	Yolomécatl Formation	Mexico	A member of the family Mustelidae. Genus includes new species O. ruizi.	
Palaeogale evanoffi	Sp. nov	Valid	Welsh	Orellan	Brule Formation	United States (South Dakota)		
Paludocyon	Gen. et comb. nov	Valid	Morales et al.	Early Miocene		Czech Republic	A bear dog. The type species is "Pseudocyon" bohemicus Schlosser (1899).	
Parailurus tedfordi	Sp. nov	Valid	Wallace & Lyon	Pliocene (Blancan)		United States (Washington)	A member of the family Ailuridae. Published online in 2021, but the copyright is listed as © 2022.	
Planopusa	Gen. et sp. nov	Valid	Koretsky & Rahmat	Middle-late Miocene		Ukraine	An earless seal belonging to the subfamily Phocinae. The type species is P. semenovi.	
Protocyon orocualensis	Sp. nov	Valid	Ruiz-Ramoni, Wang & Rincón	Late Pliocene/Early Pleistocene		Venezuela	A canid belonging to the subtribe Cerdocyonina. Announced in 2021; the final version of the article naming it was published in 2022.	
Sonitictis	Gen. et sp. nov	In press	Wang et al.	Miocene	Tunggur Formation	China	A member of the family Mustelidae, possibly belonging to the subfamily Mellivorinae. Genus includes new species S. moralesi.	
Vishnuonyx neptuni	Sp. nov	Valid	Kargopoulos et al.	Miocene		Germany	An otter.	
Vulpes rooki	Sp. nov	Valid	Bartolini Lucenti	Pliocene	Yushe Basin	China	A fox, a species of Vulpes	

==== Carnivoran research ====
- A study on late Oligocene and middle Miocene carnivoran teeth from Thailand is published by de Bonis et al. (2021), who report the oldest occurrence of the family Ursidae in southern Asia (a specimen of Cephalogale from the late Oligocene) and a new viverrid (a specimen of Semigenetta from the middle Miocene), and interpret these fossils as evidence of stratigraphic correlations of the MP29 and MN7–8 fossil sites in Europe with Southeast Asian localities.
- Revision of the fossil material from the Pliocene locality Çalta-1 (Turkey) attributed to Vulpes galatica is published by Bartolini-Lucenti & Madurell-Malapeira (2021), who evaluate the implications of these fossils for the knowledge of the evolution of members of the genus Vulpes in the Pliocene and Early Pleistocene, and interpret V. galatica as a junior synonym of Vulpes beihaiensis.
- A study on the evolutionary history of dire wolves, based on data from five genomes sequenced from sub-fossil remains, is published by Perri et al. (2021), who interpret their findings as indicating that dire wolves were members of a highly divergent lineage that split from living canids around 5.7 million years ago, and recommend transferring them to the separate genus Aenocyon.
- Bartolini-Lucenti et al. (2021) describe fossil material of Canis (Xenocyon) lycaonoides from the Dmanisi site (Georgia), representing the first record of a large-sized canid from this site reported to date, and attempt to determine the role played by social behaviour in the geographic expansion of canids and hominins.
- The earliest record of a wild dog belonging to the subgenus Xenocyon in Western Europe known to date, similar to Canis (Xenocyon) falconeri, is reported from the Roca-Neya site (France) by Bartolini-Lucenti & Spassov (2021), who also attempt to determine the dietary preferences of members of this subgenus.
- A study on the phylogenetic placement and evolutionary history of the Sardinian dhole, based on data from the genome of a ca-21,100-year-old specimen, is published by Ciucani et al. (2021).
- A study on changes of diets of gray wolves from the Yukon Territory (Canada) from the Pleistocene to the Holocene is published by Landry et al. (2021).
- A study on changes of diets of British wolves over the course of the Pleistocene is published by Flower, Schreve & Lamb (2021).
- Lahtinen et al. (2021) argue that the differences between dietary constraints of wolves and humans enabled dog domestication in harsh environments across northern Eurasia in the Late Pleistocene, as the prey species of wolves have protein ratios over the limit that humans can consume, which resulted in Upper Paleolithic hunter-gatherers having excess protein from their prey available to feed to captured/pet wolves.
- A study on the processes driving the early phases of dog domestication, based on data from canid remains from the Magdalenian cave site of Gnirshöhle (Hegau Jura, Germany), is published by Baumann et al. (2021).
- Perri et al. (2021) compare population genetic results of humans and dogs from Siberia, Beringia and North America, and interpret their findings as indicating that dogs were domesticated in Siberia by ~23,000 years ago, and subsequently accompanied the first people into the Americas.
- Da Silva Coelho et al. (2021) report a complete mitochondrial genome of an early dog from southeast Alaska, dated to approximately 10 150 calibrated years BP, and interpret this specimen as an early-branching precontact dog and evidence that initial human and dog migration into the Americas occurred together along the North Pacific coastal route.
- Description and a study on the functional anatomy of the forelimb of Amphicynodon leptorhynchus, aiming to infer probable lifestyle of this carnivoran, is published by Gardin et al. (2021).
- A study on the evolutionary history and past distributional patterns of the giant panda, based on data from ecological niche modelling, phylogeography and fossil record, is published by Luna-Aranguré & Vázquez-Domínguez (2021).
- Fossil evidence from the Shuanghe Cave (China) indicating that giant pandas had evolved a pseudo-thumb comparable to that of the modern pandas as early as 100,000 years ago is presented by Wang et al. (2021).
- Pedersen et al. (2021) report the retrieval of low-coverage environmental genomes from American black bear and giant short-faced bear from Late Pleistocene cave sediments from northern Mexico, as well as lower-coverage giant short-faced bear genomes obtained from fossils from Yukon (Canada), and evaluate the utility of these genomes for population genomic and phylogenetic studies of Late Pleistocene bears.
- Barlow et al. (2021) report the recovery of the genome of a 360,000-year-old cave bear from Kudaro 1 cave (South Ossetia), representing the oldest genome from a non-permafrost environment reported to date, and evaluate the implications of this finding for the knowledge of the evolution of cave bears.
- A study on the morphological variability and evolution of lower incisors of cave bears from the Middle and Late Pleistocene of Caucasus and Urals is published by Gimranov, Kosintsev & Baryshnikov (2021).
- A study on ancient DNA obtained from a Pleistocene brown bear remains from Honshu Island, evaluating its implications for the knowledge of the evolutionary history of extinct brown bears from the Japanese Archipelago, is published by Segawa et al. (2021).
- A study on the phylogenetic placement of barbourofelines within Carnivora, and on the evolution of sabertooth adaptations amongst carnivorans, is published by Barrett, Hopkins & Price (2021).
- Revision of the fossil record of African barbourofelines belonging to the tribe Afrosmilini is published by Werdelin (2021).
- Description of new fossil material of hyenas from the Miocene Hammerschmiede locality (Germany), and a study on the implications of these fossils for the knowledge of the evolutionary history of hyenas in Europe, is published by Kargopoulos et al. (2021).
- Three fragments of a skull of Pachycrocuta brevirostris are described from the Jinyuan Cave (Dalian, China) by Liu et al. (2021), who interpret this specimen as the largest skull of a member of this species reported so far, and evaluate its implications for the knowledge of the evolutionary history of this species.
- Description of fossil material of Pachycrocuta brevirostris from the late Early Pleistocene site of Nogaisk, representing the first record of this species from Ukraine, and a study on the evolution of this species in Eurasia is published by Marciszak et al. (2021).
- Revision of the European fossil record of Pachycrocuta brevirostris, and of the whole Epivillafranchian and Galerian record of hyenas from Europe, is published by Iannucci et al. (2021).
- A study on the diversity on North American hyenas belonging to the genus Chasmaporthetes is published by Pérez-Claros, Coca-Ortega & Werdelin (2021).
- A study on the evolutionary history of the genus Crocuta, based on data from near-complete mitochondrial genomes sequenced from two Late Pleistocene cave hyena skulls from northeastern China, is published by Hu et al. (2021).
- A study on the evolution of the mandible shape in early machairodontines, based on data from fossils of Promegantereon ogygia and Machairodus aphanistus from the Batallones localities in Spain, is published by Chatar et al. (2021).
- Fossil material of Dinofelis, representing the smallest specimens belonging to this genus reported to date (with the size of a large Eurasian lynx or small puma), is described from the latest Pliocene-earliest Early Pleistocene (ca. 2.5 million years old) Guefaït-4 site (Morocco) by Madurell-Malapeira et al. (2021), who argue that the overall small dimensions of the studied specimens not ascribable to sexual dimorphism or interspecific variability, and interpret these specimens as representing a previously unknown lineage or species of Dinofelis.
- A study on the dietary ecology of Homotherium serum, based on data from fossil specimens from the Friesenhahn Cave (Texas, United States), is published by DeSantis et al. (2021).
- Revision of the fossil material of Megantereon from the late Early Pleistocene to Middle Pleistocene strata in China is published by Li & Sun (2021).
- An association of two subadult and one adult specimen of Smilodon fatalis is reported from the Pleistocene Tablazo Formation (Ecuador) by Reynolds, Seymour & Evans (2021), who interpret the subadult specimens as likely to be siblings, and evaluate the implications of this finding for the knowledge of the life history of S. fatalis.
- A study on a pathological pelvis and associated right femur of a specimen of Smilodon fatalis from the La Brea Tar Pits (California, United States) is published by Balisi et al. (2021), who diagnose this specimen as affected by hip dysplasia, and evaluate the implications of this specimen for the knowledge of social strategies of S. fatalis.
- Fossil material of the Iberian lynx, extending known paleobiogeographical distribution of this species and representing the largest sample of lynx fossils reported from Europe to date, is described from the Late Pleistocene Ingarano site (southern Italy) by Mecozzi et al. (2021).
- A study on the impact of the climatic transition from the Pleistocene to the Holocene on cougars and bobcats, based on data from fossil from the La Brea Tar Pits, is published by Balassa, Prothero & Syverson (2021).
- Chi et al. (2021) report the discovery of fossil teeth from the Longshia-dong Cave, interpreted as the first known record of leopards from the Late Pleistocene of Taiwan.
- Preliminary description of two mummified cave lion cubs from Sakha (Russia) is published by Boeskorov et al. (2021).
- A study on changes of the range of the lion during the late Pleistocene and Holocene is published by Cooper et al. (2021).
- A study comparing the carnivore guild from the Dmanisi site with contemporary assemblages from European, Asian, and African sites is published by Bartolini-Lucenti et al. (2021).
- A study on the habitat and potential prey preferences of Smilodon populator, Protocyon troglodytes and Arctotherium wingei from the Brazilian Intertropical Region, based on data from isotopic studies, is published by Dantas et al. (2021).
- Evidence from mitochondrial genome data indicative of multiple waves of dispersal of lions and brown bears into North America across the Bering Land Bridge, coinciding with glacial periods of low sea levels, is presented by Salis et al. (2021).

=== Chiroptera ===
Name	Novelty	Status	Authors	Age	Type locality	Country	Notes	Images
Afrillonura	Gen. et sp. nov	In press	Rosina & Pickford	Miocene		Namibia	A member of the family Emballonuridae. Genus includes new species A. namibensis.	
Altaynycteris	Gen. et sp. nov	Unavailable	Jones et al.	Early Eocene. The name is not available under the ICZN Art. 8.5.3. as the electronic publication lacks evidence of registration in ZooBank.	Junggar Basin	China	Genus includes new species A. aurora.	

==== Chiropteran research ====
- Endocranial casts of four fossil species of Old World leaf-nosed bats belonging to the genera Palaeophyllophora and Hipposideros are described by Maugoust & Orliac (2021).
- A study aiming to determine probable diet and body mass of Notonycteris magdalenensis is published by López-Aguirre et al. (2021).
- A study on changes in body size and mandible shape through time and across climate regimes in the cave myotis and the big brown bat, based on data from the late Quaternary fossil record from caves in the Edwards Plateau of central Texas, is published by Moroz et al. (2021).
- A study on the fossil material of bats from the El Hierro and Lanzarote islands (the Canary Islands), including the fossil material of the Canary long-eared bat, the Madeira pipistrelle and Kuhl's pipistrelle, is described by González-Dionis et al. (2021).

=== Eulipotyphla ===
Name	Novelty	Status	Authors	Age	Type locality	Country	Notes	Images
Actinyctia	Gen. et sp. nov	Valid	Hooker	Late Eocene–Early Oligocene	Solent Group	United Kingdom	A nyctitheriid. Type species A. bulbodens.	
Amphidozotherium gassoni	Sp. nov	Valid	Hooker	Late Eocene–Early Oligocene	Solent Group	United Kingdom	A Nyctitheriid.	
Cheilonyctia	Gen. et sp. nov	Valid	Hooker	Late Eocene–Early Oligocene	Solent Group	United Kingdom	A Nyctitheriid. Type species C. lawsoni.	
Euronyctia curranti	Sp. nov	Valid	Hooker	Late Eocene–Early Oligocene	Solent Group	United Kingdom	A Nyctitheriid.	
Euronyctia plesiolambda	Sp. nov	Valid	Hooker	Late Eocene–Early Oligocene	Solent Group	United Kingdom	A Nyctitheriid.	
Indonyctia	Gen. et sp. nov	In press	Das, Carolin & Bajpai	Early Eocene	Cambay Shale	India	A Nyctitheriid. Type species I. cambayensis.	
Scraeva yulei	Sp. nov	Valid	Hooker	Late Eocene–Early Oligocene	Solent Group	United Kingdom	A Nyctitheriid.	

==== Eulipotyphlan research ====
- A study on morphological changes in molar crown morphology of three lineages of stem erinaceid eulipotyphlans from the Bighorn Basin (Wyoming, United States), aiming to determine whether the evolution of these mammals was significantly affected by the Paleocene–Eocene Thermal Maximum, is published by Vitek et al. (2021).
- A study on the mandible shape diversity in Late Pleistocene to Holocene shrews from the El Harhoura 2 site (Morocco), evaluating the relationship between their morphology and environment, is published by Terray et al. (2021).

=== Notoungulata ===
Name	Novelty	Status	Authors	Age	Type locality	Country	Notes	Images
Boleatherium	Gen. et sp. nov	Valid	Vera, Scarano & Reguero	Miocene	Cerro Boleadoras Formation	Argentina	A member of Interatheriinae. Genus includes new species is B. praeludium.	
Colbertia falui	Sp. nov	Valid	Fernández et al.	Eocene (Casamayoran)	Quebrada de los Colorados Formation	Argentina	A member of Typotheria.	
Nanolophodon	Gen. et sp. nov	Valid	Castro et al.	Early Eocene	Itaboraí Basin	Brazil	A basal notoungulate. Genus includes new species N. tutuca.	
Neoicochilus	Gen. et comb. nov	Valid	Fernández, Fernicola & Cerdeño	Santacrucian	Santa Cruz Formation	Argentina	A member of the family Interatheriidae; a new genus for "Icochilus" undulatus.	
Teushentherium	Gen. et sp. nov	Valid	Martínez et al.	Deseadan	Sarmiento Formation	Argentina	A member of Toxodonta. The type species is T. camaronensis.	

==== Notoungulate research ====
- A study on the evolution of the body size and hypsodonty in notoungulates is published by Solórzano & Núñez-Flores (2021).
- A study on cranial endocasts of notoungulates, and on the implications of endocranial data for the knowledge of the phylogenetic relationships of notoungulates, is published by Perini et al. (2021).
- A study on the enamel microstructure in permanent and deciduous teeth of specimens of Toxodon, evaluating the evolutionary and functional implications of histological enamel features in the studied teeth, is published by Braunn, Ferigolo & Ribeiro (2021).
- A study on the shape and size of molars in nine species of Protypotherium, aiming to determine the impact of climate change in South America during Miocene on the evolution of this genus, is published by Scarano, Vera & Reguero (2021).
- A study on the morphology of deciduous and permanent teeth of Interatherium and Protypotherium, reevaluating the diagnostic dental characteristics used to describe interatheriine taxa, is published by Fernández, Fernicola & Cerdeño (2021), who transfer the species Eudiastatus lingulatus to the genus Protypotherium.
- A study on the shape and evolution of the snout in mesotheriid notoungulates, and on its implications for the knowledge of the dietary preferences in mesotheriids, is published by Ercoli & Armella (2021).
- A study on tooth size variations within assemblages of Tremacyllus is published by Armella (2021).

=== Perissodactyla ===
Name	Novelty	Status	Authors	Age	Type locality	Country	Notes	Images
Elasmotherium primigenium	Sp. nov	In press	Sun, Deng & Jiangzuo	Late Miocene		China		
Eoazara	Gen. et sp. nov	Valid	Geraads & Zouhri	Late Miocene	Ouarzazate Basin	Morocco	A rhinoceros in the subfamily Elasmotheriinae. The type species is E. xerrii.	
Eomoropus meridiorientalis	Sp. nov	In press	Ducrocq et al.	Late Eocene	Krabi Basin	Thailand	An eomoropid chalicotherioid.	
Gobicerops	Nom. nov		Bai et al.	Early Eocene	Arshanto	China	A rhinocerotoid belonging to the family Forstercooperiidae; a replacement name for Gobioceras Bai et al. (2019)	
Leptolophus cuestai	Sp. nov	Valid	Perales-Gogenola et al.	Late Eocene	Miranda-Treviño Basin	Spain	A member of the family Palaeotheriidae.	
Leptolophus franzeni	Sp. nov	Valid	Perales-Gogenola et al.	Late Eocene	Miranda-Treviño Basin	Spain	A member of the family Palaeotheriidae.	
Miodiceros	Gen. et comb. nov	Valid	Giaourtsakis	Miocene		Bulgaria; Greece; Iran; Turkey	A rhinoceros belonging to the tribe Rhinocerotini and the subtribe Dicerotina. The type species is "Atelodus" neumayri Osborn (1900).	
Nesorhinus	Gen. et comb. nov	Valid	Antoine et al.	Pleistocene		Philippines; Taiwan	A rhinoceros. Genus includes "Rhinoceros" philippinensis von Koenigswald (1956) and "Rhinoceros sinensis" hayasakai Otsuka & Lin (1984; raised to the rank of a separate species N. hayasakai).	
Paraceratherium linxiaense	Sp. nov	Valid	Deng et al.	Oligocene	Jiaozigou Formation	China	A paracerathere.	
Pliorhinus	Gen. et comb. nov	Valid	Pandolfi et al.	Early Pliocene			A rhinoceros. The type species is "Rhinoceros" megarhinus de Christol (1834); genus also includes "Dicerorhinus" miguelcrusafonti Guérin & Santafé-Llopis (1978).	
Ronzotherium heissigi	Sp. nov	Valid	Tissier, Antoine & Becker	Oligocene		France; Switzerland	A rhinoceros.	

==== Perissodactyl research ====
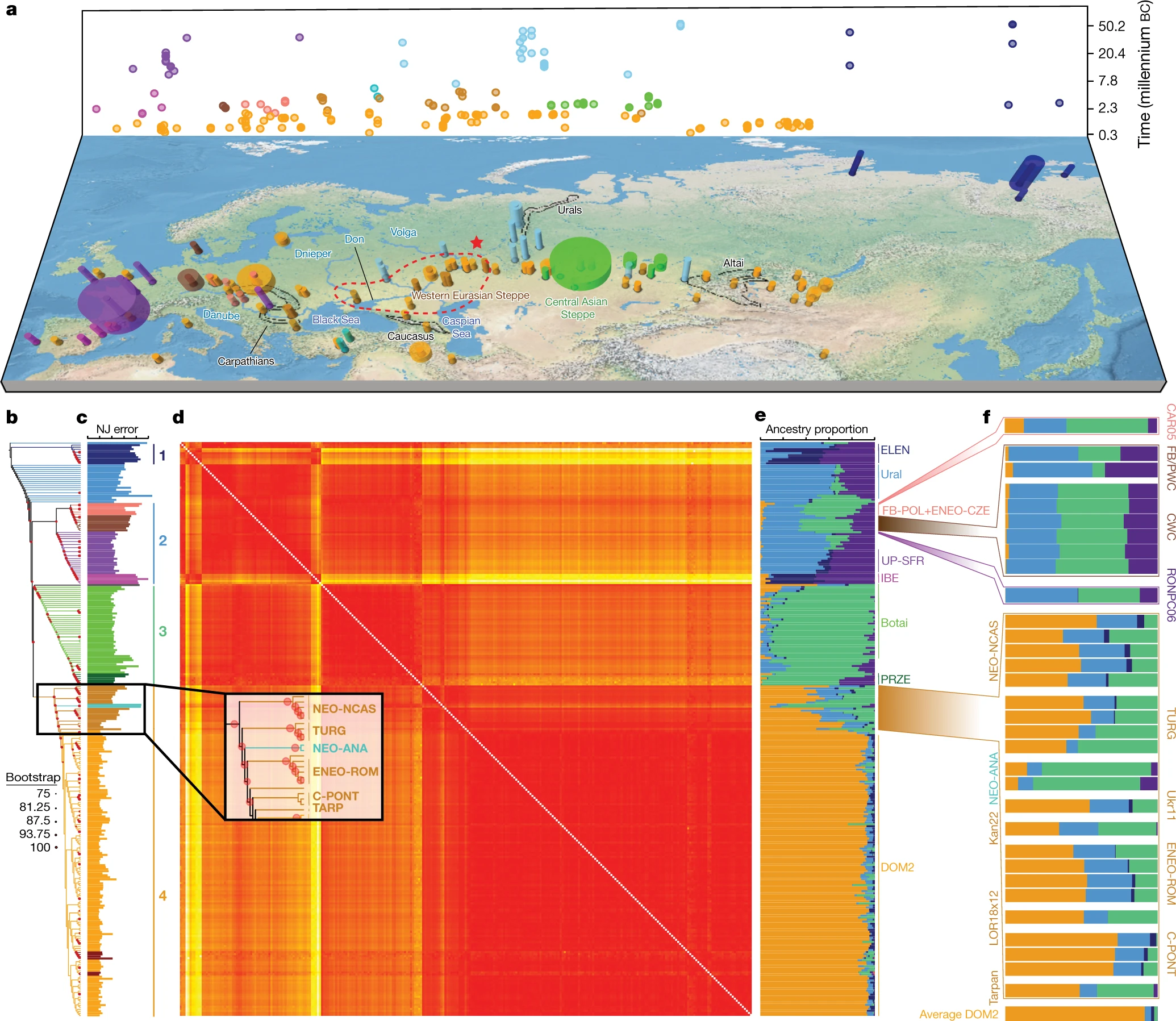
According to a genetic analysis of Pablo Librado et al., today's domestic horses descend from the lower Volga-Don region, Russia.

- Description of new fossil material of Lophiaspis maurettei from the early Eocene of France, and a study on the phylogenetic relationships of this species and lophiodontids in general, is published by Vautrin et al. (2021).
- New fossil material of chalicotheres, indicating that the fossil record of the genus Ancylotherium in Africa dates back to ca. 10 Ma, is described from the upper Miocene Nakali Formation (Kenya) by Handa et al. (2021).
- A study on the variation of shapes in forelimb bones and its relationship with body mass in members of Rhinocerotoidea throughout their evolutionary history is published by Mallet et al. (2021).
- Revision of the fossil material of rhinoceroses from the Rotem and Yeroham basins in the Negev (Israel), including fossils of a member of the genus Brachypotherium belonging or related to the species B. snowi, and the only record of Gaindatherium found outside the Sivalik Hills, is published by Pandolfi et al. (2021), who evaluate the implications of these fossils for the knowledge of the biogeography and dispersal of rhinoceroses during the early Neogene.
- New fossil material of Aprotodon lanzhouensis is described from the Miocene Xianshuihe Formation (China) by Li et al. (2021).
- A study on the ecology and the eventual niche partitioning of rhinocerotids from the Miocene locality of Béon 1 (France) is published by Hullot et al. (2021).
- The head of the genus Elasmotherium is reinterpreted by Titov et al. (2021), who cast doubt on the popular interpretation that it carried a massive horn, instead hypothesizing that it supported a resonating chamber.
- New fossil material of Stephanorhinus kirchbergensis is described from localities in West Siberia and East Siberia by Lobachev et al. (2021), expanding known geographic distribution of this species and providing new information on its ecology, variability, and evolution.
- A study on the ecology of the woolly rhinoceros, based on data from carbon and nitrogen stable isotopes from bone and tooth specimens and from mitochondrial DNA sequences, is published by Rey-Iglesia et al. (2021).
- A study on range changes and environment of the woolly rhinoceros in west Beringia (northeast Asia) during the Late Pleistocene is published by Puzachenko et al. (2021).
- A study on the evolutionary history of rhinocerotids, based on data from genomes of extant and extinct taxa, is published by Liu et al. (2021).
- Revision of the fossil material of brontotheres from Duchesnean and early Chadronian mammal faunas from the Big Bend Area in west Texas and Mexico is published by Mihlbachler & Prothero (2021).
- A study on the morphology of the central forelimb metapodial joint surface in extant and extinct members of Equoidea, aiming to determine potential drivers of modifications of the shape of metapodial–phalangeal joint in horse limbs throughout their evolutionary history, is published by MacLaren (2021).
- A study on the gait and speed of extinct horses, based on data from footprints likely produced by Scaphohippus intermontanus and Equus conversidens, is published by Vincelette (2021).
- A study on the evolution, biogeography and ecology of Eurasian and African hipparion horses living between 11.4 and 1 million years ago is published by Bernor et al. (2021).
- A study on the bone and dental histology of Eurygnathohippus hooijeri, and on its implications for the knowledge of the life history of this equid, is published by Nacarino-Meneses & Chinsamy (2021).
- Partially complete skeleton of a specimen of Hippidion saldiasi living near the end of the last glaciation, representing the southernmost high-elevation record for this species reported to date, is described from the Salar de Surire (northern Chile) by Labarca et al. (2021), who attempt to determine the body mass and diet of this specimen.
- A study testing existing body mass estimation equations of equids for their accuracy with modern zebras, and evaluating the implications of this test for the knowledge of the relationship between body size, diet and habitat in Pleistocene members of the genus Equus from Europe, is published by Saarinen et al. (2021).
- A study on the validity of the genera Plesippus and Allohippus, on the evolutionary relationships of Equus stenonis to other Old World Pleistocene and extant members of the genus Equus, and on the origin of zebras and asses is published by Cirilli et al. (2021).
- Revision of the European record of Equus stenonis and related forms is published by Cirilli et al. (2021).
- Revision of the fossil material of horses from the Dmanisi site (Georgia), including the oldest well-calibrated occurrence of Equus altidens in western Eurasia, is published by Bernor et al. (2021).
- A skull of the Grévy's zebra, representing the oldest definitive record of this species reported to date, is described from the Pleistocene Kapthurin Formation (Kenya) by O'Brien et al. (2021).
- Revision of the fossil material of Equus apolloniensis from the Pleistocene Apollonia 1 site (Mygdonia Basin, Greece), and a study on the phylogenetic relationships of this species, is published by Gkeme, Koufos & Kostopoulos (2021).
- A study aiming to determine possible impact of the Bering Land Bridge on genetic diversity and connectivity among North American and Eurasian populations of the caballine horses throughout their evolutionary history, based on data from mitochondrial and nuclear genomes from present-day and extinct horses sampled across the Holarctic is published by Vershinina et al. (2021).
- A study on the histology of limb bones of specimens of Equus occidentalis from La Brea Tar Pits (California, United States), and on its implications for the knowledge of life history of the studied specimens, is published by Tomassini et al. (2021).
- A genetic analysis by Pablo Librado et al. finds that today's domestic horses descend from the lower Volga-Don region, Russia. 273 ancient horse genomes further indicate that these populations replaced almost all local populations as they expanded rapidly throughout Eurasia from about 4200 years ago, that certain adaptations were strongly selected for by horse riding, and that equestrian material culture – including Sintashta spoke-wheeled chariots (but not Indo-European languages) and in the case of Asia Indo-Iranian languages – spread alongside.

=== Other laurasiatherians ===
Name	Novelty	Status	Authors	Age	Type locality	Country	Notes	Images
Cynohyaenodon smithae	Sp. nov	In press	Solé et al.	Eocene (Ypresian)		France	A Hyaenodont.	
Ekweeconfractus	Gen. et sp. nov	Valid	Flink et al.	Early Miocene	Lothidok Formation	Kenya	A Teratodontidae hyaenodont. The type species is E. amorui.	
Eurotherium mapplethorpei	Sp. nov	In press	Solé et al.	Eocene (Ypresian)		France	A Hyaenodont.	
Lesmesodon gunnelli	Sp. nov	In press	Solé et al.	Eocene (Ypresian)		France	A Hyaenodont.	
Neovulpavus mccarrolli	Sp. nov	Valid	Tomiya et al.	Uintan	Washakie Formation	United States (Wyoming)	A basal member of Carnivoraformes.	
Smutsia olteniensis	Sp. nov	In press	Terhune et al.	Early Pleistocene		Romania	A pangolin, a species of Smutsia.	

==== Miscellaneous laurasiatherian research ====
- A study on the diet of Macrauchenia patachonica, as indicated by data from dental calculus, is published by de Oliveira et al. (2021).
- A study on the impact of the Paleocene–Eocene Thermal Maximum on the body size in the lineage of the mesonychid Dissacus praenuntius is published by Solé et al. (2021).
- A study on the anatomy of the braincase of Eurotherium theriodis, and on its implications for the knowledge of the likely ecology of this mammal, is published by Dubied, Solé & Mennecart (2021).

== Xenarthrans ==
=== Cingulata ===
Name	Novelty	Status	Authors	Age	Type locality	Country	Notes	Images
Noatherium	Gen. et sp. nov	Valid	Fernicola et al.	Eocene (Ypresian)	Lumbrera Formation	Argentina	A Cingulatan. Type species N. emilioi.	
Plesiodasypus	Gen. et sp. nov	In press	Barasoain et al.	Middle Miocene	La Victoria Formation	Colombia	A Dasypodini dasypodid armadillo. Type species P. colombianus.	
Saltatherium	Gen. et sp. nov	In press	Fernicola et al.	Middle Eocene	Quebrada de Los Colorados Formation	Argentina	A Cingulatan. Type species S. rosaurae.	
?Utaetus magnum	Sp. nov	Valid	Herrera et al.	Eocene (Bartonian)	Lumbrera Formation	Argentina	A Euphractinae chlamyphorid hairy armadillo of uncertain generic affiliation.	

==== Cingulata research ====
- A study on the anatomy of the bony labyrinth of the glyptodonts Glyptodon, Doedicurus, Panochthus and Pseudoplohophorus, as well as the pampathere Holmesina, is published by Tambusso et al. (2021), who evaluate the implications of their findings for the knowledge of the phylogenetic placement of glyptodonts and pampatheres.
- A study on the anatomy of the bony canals and cavities in the skulls of glyptodonts and armadillos, evaluating their implications for the knowledge of the evolutionary history of cingulates, is published by Le Verger, González Ruiz & Billet (2021).
- A study on the anatomy and phylogenetic relationships of Eleutherocercus solidus is published by Núñez-Blasco et al. (2021).
- A study on the evolution of the caudal tube in member of the genus Panochthus, and on the relationship between the shape of the tube and its usage as a weapon, is published by Zamorano & Fariña (2021).
- Revision and a study on the phylogenetic relationships of the genus Vetelia is published by Barasoain et al. (2021).

=== Pilosa ===
Name	Novelty	Status	Authors	Age	Type locality	Country	Notes	Images
Parocnus dominicanus	Sp. nov	Valid	McAfee et al.	Late Pleistocene-early Holocene		Dominican Republic	A megalocnid sloth	
Similhapalops	Gen. et sp. nov	Valid	Pujos et al.	Deseadan	Agua de la Piedra Formation	Argentina	A small non-megalonychid megatherioid sloth. Type species S. nivis.	
Zacatzontli cotobrusensis	Sp. nov	In press	Valerio et al.	Hemphillian	Curré Formation	Costa Rica	A megalonychid ground sloth.	

==== Pilosa research ====
- Fossil material of a sloth belonging to the family Megalocnidae is described from the late Miocene-early Pliocene Yanigüa-Los Haitises Formation (Dominican Republic) by Viñola-Lopez et al. (2021), representing the oldest fossil ground sloth from Hispaniola reported to date.
- The first record of Meizonyx salvadorensis from the late Pleistocene of Mexico is reported by McDonald et al. (2021), who study the phylogenetic relationships of this species, and discuss the palaeobiogeographical and palaeoecological implications of this finding.
- A study on the anomaly altering the size of the pituitary gland in a specimen of Valgipes bucklandi is published by Amaral et al. (2021), who interpret this anomaly as a probable pituitary tumor.
- A study on the anatomy of the postcranial skeleton of Simomylodon uccasamamensis, and on its implications for the knowledge of the phylogenetic relationships and locomotion of this species, is published by Boscaini et al. (2021).
- A study on the diet of Mylodon darwini, as indicated by isotopic analyses of nitrogen of amino acids from hair samples, is published by Tejada et al. (2021).
- A study on the pollen content of a well-preserved coprolite of Mylodon darwinii from the Mylodon Cave (Chile), and on its implications for the knowledge of the diet of this sloth, is published by van Geel et al. (2021).
- A study on the enlarged lower caniniform teeth of Lestodon armatus is published by Varela, McDonald & Fariña (2021), who interpret their findings as supporting the existence of sexual dimorphism in L. armatus.
- A petrosal bone of Glossotherium tropicorum is described from the Pleistocene of Trinidad by Gaudin & Broome (2021), expanding known geographic range of this species.
- A study reporting the occurrence of Valgipes bucklandi in the Arroyo del Vizcaíno site (Uruguay), expanding the known distribution of this sloth in the late Pleistocene, is published by Lobato et al. (2021).

== Other eutherians ==
Name	Novelty	Status	Authors	Age	Type locality	Country	Notes	Images
Arcius moniquae	Sp. nov	In press	Godinot & Vidalenc in Godinot et al.	Eocene	Quercy Phosphorites Formation	France	A paromomyid plesiadapiform.	
Asiapator	Gen. et sp. nov	Valid	Lopatin & Averianov	Eocene (Irdinmanhan)	Khaychin Formation	Mongolia	A member of the family Apatemyidae. Genus includes new species A. onchin.	
Azilestes	Gen. et sp. nov	Valid	Gheerbrant & Teodori	Late Cretaceous (Maastrichtian)	Formation des Grès de Labarre	France	An early eutherian of uncertain phylogenetic placement, possibly a member of the family Zhelestidae. The type species is A. ragei.	
Beornus	Gen. et sp. nov	Valid	Atteberry & Eberle	Puercan	Fort Union Formation	United States (Wyoming)	A member of the family Periptychidae. Genus includes new species B. honeyi.	
Conacodon hettingeri	Sp. nov	Valid	Atteberry & Eberle	Puercan	Fort Union Formation	United States (Wyoming)	A member of the family Periptychidae.	
Ectocion stockeyae	Sp. nov	Valid	Montellano-Ballesteros, Fox & Scott	Late Paleocene	Paskapoo Formation	Canada (Alberta)	A member of the family Phenacodontidae.	
Hyopsodus arshantensis	Sp. nov	Valid	Bai et al.	Eocene (Arshantan)	Arshanto Formation	China	A member of the family Hyopsodontidae.	
Micropternodus bassidens	Sp. nov	Valid	Korth, Kihm & Schumaker	Chadronian		United States (North Dakota)		
Miniconus	Gen. et comb. et sp. nov	Valid	Atteberry & Eberle	Early Paleocene	Denver Formation; Fort Union Formation	United States (Colorado; Wyoming)	A member of the family Periptychidae. The type species is "Oxyacodon" archibaldi Middleton & Dewar (2004); genus also includes new species M. jeanninae.	
Oligoryctes amplissimus	Sp. nov	Valid	Korth, Kihm & Schumaker	Chadronian		United States (North Dakota)		
Purgatorius mckeeveri	Sp. nov		Wilson Mantilla et al.	Early Paleocene	Fort Union Formation	United States (Montana)		
Sinclairella nanus	Sp. nov	Valid	Korth, Kihm & Schumaker	Chadronian		United States (North Dakota)	An apatemyid.	

=== Other eutherian research ===
- Description of the tympanic petrosal anatomy of Deltatherium fundaminis is published by Shelley et al. (2021).
- A study on the phylogenetic affinities of extinct native South American ungulates is published by Avilla & Mothé (2021); their conclusions are subsequently contested by Kramarz & Macphee (2022).
- A study on the phylogenetic affinities of Escribania chubutensis and other extinct native South American ungulates is published by Kramarz, Bond & MacPhee (2021).
- A study on limb evolution in native South American ungulates from the late Oligocene to Pleistocene is published by Croft & Lorente (2021).
- A study on the skull anatomy and phylogenetic relationships of Trigonostylops wortmani is published by MacPhee et al. (2021).
- New data on the anatomy of the skull of Palaeolagus haydeni, including the structures of the nasal and auditory regions of the skull, is presented by Wolniewicz & Fostowicz-Frelik (2021) and Ruf, Meng & Fostowicz-Frelik (2021).
- A study on evolutionary transitions of microsyopid plesiadapiforms from the early Eocene of the southern Bighorn Basin (Wyoming, United States) is published by Silcox et al. (2021), who interpret the fossil record as indicating that Microsyops angustidens branched off from a population of Arctodontomys nuptus, but the latter species persisted and did not suffer pseudoextinction, providing a rare example of possible cladogenesis in the fossil record.
- A study on dietary changes in microsyopids over time is published by Selig, Chew & Silcox (2021).
- Description of dental caries in a sample of teeth of Microsyops latidens, representing the earliest known incidences of caries among fossil mammals, is published by Selig & Silcox (2021), who evaluate the implications of the studied fossils for the knowledge of the diet of M. latidens.
- A study on jaw form and function in Chiromyoides is published by Boyer, Schaeffer & Beard (2021), who interpret this plesiadapid as an extractive forager similar to extant aye-aye.

== General eutherian research ==
- A study on factors affecting the accuracy of mitogenomic phylogeny reconstruction for placental mammals is published by Phillips & Shazwani Zakaria (2021), who also study the phylogenetic relationships of glyptodonts, Macrauchenia and sabre-toothed and scimitar cats among placental mammals on the basis of data from mitochondrial DNA.
- Geochemical analyses of Paleogene terrestrial mammal remains from the Ouled Abdoun Basin (Morocco), aiming to establish their taphonomy, stratigraphic provenance and paleoenvironmental conditions, are performed by Kocsis et al. (2021).
- A study aiming to determine whether the dietary niches of hyaenodonts and carnivorans from the Chadronian Calf Creek Local Fauna (Cypress Hills Formation; Saskatchewan, Canada) overlapped is published by Christison et al. (2021).
- A study on the lineage diversification and loss in Afro-Arabian mammal groups (hyaenodonts, anomaluroid and hystricognath rodents, and anthropoid and strepsirrhine primates) since the early Eocene is published by de Vries et al. (2021), who interpret their findings as indicative of widespread extinction of Afro-Arabian mammals in the early Oligocene.
- A study on the age of fossils from the Santa Rosa fossil locality (Peru), and on its implications for the knowledge of the age of the oldest known South American primates and caviomorph rodents from this site and from the CTA-27 site in the Contamana region of Peru, is published by Campbell et al. (2021).
- Evidence of long periods of functional stasis in mammalian ecological assemblages from the Iberian Peninsula spanning the past 21 million years is presented by Blanco et al. (2021).
- A study on the relative dimensions and compactness of ribs and limb bones in true seals and cetaceans from the Miocene of the Paratethys is published by Dewaele et al. (2021), who interpret their findings as indicative of convergent re-emergence of bone densification in the studied mammals.
- Revision of the fossil material of late Miocene proboscideans and odd-toed ungulates from the Kaisiinitsa and Tranerska formations (Bulgaria) is published by Böhme et al. (2021).
- 10-million-year long proxy record of Arabian climate is developed by Böhme et al. (2021), who report evidence indicative of a sustained period of hyperaridity in the Pliocene and a number of transient periods of hyperaridity in northern Arabia during the late Miocene which were out of phase with those in North Africa, and argue that these desert dynamics had a strong control on large-scale mammalian dispersals between Africa and Eurasia.
- The first known terrestrial vertebrate fauna from the early Pliocene of western Africa, including a diversity of large mammals with a high proportion of carnivorans, is described from the Tobène site (Senegal) by Lihoreau et al. (2021).
- A study on the dietary behavior and specialization of North American mammalian herbivores over the past 7 million years, based on stable isotope data from tooth enamel, is published by Pardi & DeSantis (2021).
- Arriaza et al. (2021) report presence of brown hyena tooth marks on australopith remains from Sterkfontein's Plio-Pleistocene-age Member 4 (South Africa), and interpret this finding as first direct evidence of hyenid scavenging on australopiths.
- A study comparing the large mammal assemblage from the Dmanisi site (Georgia) with African and Eurasian assemblages of similar age, and evaluating its implications for the knowledge of the timing and direction of zoogeographic connections between western Eurasia and Africa during the Early Pleistocene, is published by Bartolini-Lucenti et al. (2021).
- A study on Pleistocene extinctions in the Southern Levant throughout the last 1.5 million years and their likely causes is published by Dembitzer et al. (2021), who interpret their findings as indicating that humans extirpated Levantine megafauna throughout the Pleistocene, and when the largest species were depleted the next-largest were targeted; their conclusions are subsequently contested by Orbach, Amos & Yeshurun (2022).
- Evidence from mitochondrial data from fossil horses and a camel recovered from the Natural Trap Cave (Wyoming, United States), indicative of high level of genetic connectivity between horse and camel populations in the Bighorn Mountains and Eastern Beringia during the Pleistocene, is presented by Mitchell et al. (2021).
- A study on the diets of Late Pleistocene Alaskan bisons and horses, as indicated by data from tooth wear, is published by Kelly et al. (2021).
- A study on the fossil record of the Late Quaternary North American megafauna, aiming to determine whether human population levels, climate change, or both correspond quantitatively to changes in megafauna population levels through time, is published by Stewart, Carleton & Groucutt (2021).
- A study on ancient environmental DNA of plants and animals recovered from sediments from sites distributed across much of the Arctic covering the past 50 thousand years is published by Wang et al. (2021), who interpret their findings as providing evidence of the survival of the woolly rhinoceros in northeast Kolyma as late as approximately 9.8 ka and the survival of mammoths in North America and Siberia into the Early Holocene (as late as approximately 3.9 ka in the area of the Taymyr Peninsula), and providing evidence of a previously unsampled mitochondrial lineage of mammoths; their conclusions about the late survival of the mammoths are subsequently contested by Miller & Simpson (2022).
- Murchie et al. (2021) present a 30,000-year sedimentary ancient DNA record from permafrost silts in the Klondike region of Yukon (Canada), and interpret their findings as indicative of persistence of North American horses and woolly mammoths for thousands of years after their supposed disappearance from the fossil record.
- A study on the impact of humans on the late Pleistocene megafaunal extinctions in South America, comparing the temporal dynamics and spatial distribution of South American megafauna and fluted (Fishtail) projectile points, is published by Prates & Perez (2021).
- A study on the impact of climatic and environmental changes on Equus neogeus and Notiomastodon platensis, aiming to determine how the spatial extent of habitats suitable for these mammals changed between the Last Glacial Maximum and the middle Holocene, is published by Araújo et al. (2021).
- A study on ancient DNA of hominins and other mammals extracted from Pleistocene deposits in the Denisova Cave (Russia) is published by Zavala et al. (2021), who interpret their findings as indicative of two major turnovers of large mammals present at this site, of repeated occupation of the site by Denisovans and Neanderthals, and of the appearance of modern humans at this site at least 45,000 years ago.
- Gelabert et al. (2021) retrieve nuclear and mitochondrial human, wolf and bison genomes from a 25,000-year-old sediment sample from the Satsurblia Cave (Georgia), and evaluate the implications of these genomes for the knowledge of the evolutionary history of these species.
- A study on the diets of Pleistocene and Holocene megafauna, based on data from permafrost and ice-preserved faeces of woolly mammoth, horse, steppe bison, and Holocene and extant caribou, is published by Polling et al. (2021).

== Metatherians ==
Name	Novelty	Status	Authors	Age	Type locality	Country	Notes	Images
Bulbadon	Gen. et sp. nov	Valid	Travouillon, Beck & Case	Late Oligocene		Australia	A potential thylacomyid. Genus includes new species B. warburtonae	
Bulungu minkinaensis	Sp. nov	Valid	Travouillon, Beck & Case	Late Oligocene		Australia	A member of Yaraloidea.	
Bulungu pinpaensis	Sp. nov	Valid	Travouillon, Beck & Case	Late Oligocene		Australia	A member of Yaraloidea.	
Bulungu westermani	Sp. nov	Valid	Travouillon, Beck & Case	Late Oligocene		Australia	A member of Yaraloidea.	
Caenolestoides	Gen. et sp. nov	Valid	Abello, Martin & Cardoso	Early Miocene		Argentina	A shrew opossum. Genus includes new species C. miocaenicus.	
Diogenesia	Gen. et sp. nov	Valid	Oliveira, Carneiro & Goin	Itaboraian	Itaboraí Basin	Brazil	A member of the family Derorhynchidae. The type species is D. brevirostris.	
Gaimanlestes	Gen. et sp. nov	Valid	Abello, Martin & Cardoso	Early Miocene		Argentina	A shrew opossum. Genus includes new species G. pascuali.	
Scalaridelphys	Nom. nov	Valid	Cohen, Davis & Cifelli	Late Cretaceous (Turonian)	Straight Cliffs Formation	United States (Utah)	A member of Pediomyoidea belonging to the family Aquiladelphidae; a replacement name for Scalaria Cohen, Davis & Cifelli (2020).	
Stilotherium parvum	Sp. nov	Valid	Abello, Martin & Cardoso	Early Miocene		Argentina	A shrew opossum.	

=== Metatherian research ===
- A study aiming to determine whether functional constraints during development may have limited evolution of the morphological diversity of metatherian jaws relative to the morphological diversity of eutherian jaws, based on data from extant and fossil metatherians and eutherians, is published by Fabre et al. (2021).
- Revision of the fossil record of Cenozoic metatherians and alleged metatherians from Africa is published by Crespo & Goin (2021).
- A study on the pre-Quaternary fossil record of the family Didelphidae, aiming to determine the area of origin and diversification of this group, is published by Castro, Dahur & Ferreira (2021).
- A study on the mobility of the elbow in Palorchestes azael, and on its implications for the knowledge of the likely posture of this marsupial, is published by Richards et al. (2021).
- New postcranial material of Wakaleo vanderleuri and W. alcootaensis, providing evidence of increasing adaptation towards terrestrial locomotion and felid-like grappling predation within the Wakaleo lineage, is described from mid- and late-Miocene fossil deposits from the Australian Northern Territory by Warburton & Yates (2021).
- A study on the diet of Hulitherium tomasettii is published by White et al. (2021).
- A study on the timing of persistence of Diprotodon optatum is published by Price et al. (2021).
- New fossil material of "Wallabia" kitcheneri, providing new information on the anatomy of this kangaroo, is described from the Thylacoleo Caves (Nullarbor Plain, Australia) by Warburton & Prideaux (2021), who transfer this species to the genus Congruus.
- A study on the humeral morphology of extinct giant kangaroos belonging to the genus Protemnodon and to the subfamily Sthenurinae, and on its implications for the knowledge of the locomotion of these kangaroos, is published by Jones et al. (2021).

== Other mammals ==
Name	Novelty	Status	Authors	Age	Type locality	Country	Notes	Images
Aenigmamys	Gen. et sp. nov	Valid	Scott	Early Paleocene	Willow Creek Formation	Canada (Alberta)	A multituberculate belonging to the family Ptilodontidae. Genus includes new species A. aries.	
Amarillodon	Gen. et sp. nov	In press	Martin et al.	Late Cretaceous (Cenomanian)	Mata Amarilla Formation	Argentina	A member of Meridiolestida. Genus includes new species A. meridionalis.	
Hercynodon	Gen. et sp. nov	Valid	Martin et al.	Late Jurassic (Kimmeridgian)	Süntel Formation	Germany	A member of the family Dryolestidae. The type species is H. germanicus.	
Jueconodon	Gen. et sp. nov	Valid	Mao et al.	Early Cretaceous (early Barremian to early Aptian)	Yixian Formation	China	A member of Eutriconodonta. Genus includes new species J. cheni.	
Kogaionon radulescui	Sp. nov	In press	Smith et al.	Late Cretaceous	Sânpetru Formation	Romania	A multituberculate.	
Nokerbaatar	Gen. et comb. nov	Valid	Lopatin & Averianov	Early Cretaceous		Mongolia	A multituberculate belonging to the family Eobaataridae; a new genus for "Eobaatar" minor Kielan-Jaworowska, Dashzeveg & Trofimov (1987).	
Orretherium	Gen. et sp. nov	Valid	Martinelli et al.	Late Cretaceous (late Campanian to early Maastrichtian)	Dorotea Formation	Chile	A member of Meridiolestida belonging to the family Mesungulatidae. The type species is O. tzen.	
Treslagosodon	Gen. et sp. nov	In press	Martin et al.	Late Cretaceous (Cenomanian)	Mata Amarilla Formation	Argentina	A dryolestid. Genus includes new species T. shehuensis.	
Yubaatar qianzhouensis	Sp. nov	Valid	Hu & Han	Late Cretaceous	Hekou Formation	China	A multituberculate.	

=== Other mammalian research ===
- Two isolated mammal petrosals are described from the Upper Jurassic Morrison Formation (Cisco Mammal Quarry, Utah, United States) by Davis, Cifelli & Rougier (2021), who report the presence of several plesiomorphic mammalian characters, but also the cochlear endocast making one full turn (a derived condition known in early therians such as Prokennalestes, but previously unrecorded in the Jurassic), and evaluate the implications of the studied specimens for the knowledge of the mammalian inner ear evolution.
- Fragment of a dentary of Gobiconodon borissiaki with tooth marks which were probably produced by multituberculates is described from the Early Cretaceous Zuun-Höövör locality (Mongolia) by Lopatin (2021), who interprets this finding as earliest evidence of scavenging by multituberculates.
- Partial skeleton of a member of the genus Kryptobaatar, preserving anatomical characters specific to Kryptobaatar dashzevegi and others specific to K. mandahuensis, is described from the Campanian Bayan Mandahu Formation (China) by Devillet et al. (2021), who evaluate the implications of this specimen for the knowledge of the intraspecific variability in multituberculates belonging to the genus Kryptobaatar, as well as the validity of the species K. mandahuensis.
- New skull material of Taeniolabis taoensis, providing new information on the anatomy of this multituberculate, is described from the Paleocene (Danian) Denver Formation (Colorado, United States) by Krause et al. (2021).
- Description of the first maxillae and additional new specimens of Reigitherium bunodontum from the Upper Cretaceous La Colonia Formation (Argentina), providing new information on the anatomy of this mammal, and a study on its phylogenetic relationships is published by Rougier et al. (2021).
- Putative docodont and ausktribosphenid australosphenidan fossil material, representing the first possible records of both groups from South America, is reported from the Cenomanian Mata Amarilla Formation (Argentina) by Martin et al. (2021).

== General research ==
- A study on the evolution of the brain size relative to the body size in mammals, based on data from extant and extinct taxa, is published by Smaers et al. (2021).
- A study on the evolution of the morphological diversity of mammals and their closest mammaliaform relatives is published by Brocklehurst et al. (2021), who interpret their findings as indicating that Mesozoic crown-group therians were significantly more constrained in their capacity to evolve novel phenotypes than other mammaliaforms, and that relaxation of these constraints occurred in the Paleocene, post-dating the Cretaceous–Paleogene extinction event and coinciding with environmental shifts and declining diversity of non-theriimorph mammaliaforms.
- A study evaluating how jaw shape and mechanical advantage of the masseter and temporalis muscles relate to diet in extant and Mesozoic mammals is published by Morales-García et al. (2021).
- A study comparing data from molecular timetrees and fossil record of mammals, and evaluating their implications for the knowledge whether mammals exhibited a burst of lineage diversification coincident with, before, or after the Cretaceous–Paleogene extinction event, is published by Upham, Esselstyn & Jetz (2021).
- A study on the timeline of mammal evolution, based on data from 72 mammal genomes, is published by Álvarez-Carretero et al. (2021), who interpret their findings as refuting an explosive model of placental mammal origination in the Paleogene, and indicating that crown Placentalia originated in the Late Cretaceous.
- A study on patterns of substrate preference among crown group mammals living across the Cretaceous–Paleogene boundary is published by Hughes et al. (2021), who interpret their findings as suggestive of a pattern of predominant survivorship of the Cretaceous–Paleogene extinction event among semi-arboreal or nonarboreal mammals, but also indicating that some or all members of the total group of Euarchonta might have maintained arboreal habits across the Cretaceous–Paleogene boundary.
- A study on the diversity of locomotor ecologies of Paleocene mammals, and on its implications for the knowledge of the evolution of tarsal morphology of mammals in the aftermath of the Cretaceous–Paleogene extinction event, is published by Shelley, Brusatte & Williamson (2021).
- Tracks produced by mammals walking across submerged to partially emergent tidal flats, representing the oldest evidence of the utilization of marine habitat by mammals reported to date, are described from the Paleocene Hanna Formation (Wyoming, United States) by Wroblewski & Gulas-Wroblewski (2021).
- A study on the anatomy of the skulls of saber-toothed mammals, and on its implications for the knowledge of likely killing behaviours of these mammals, is published by Melchionna et al. (2021).
- A study on patterns of mammalian species richness in the Basin and Range Province of western North America throughout the last 36 million years, aiming to determine whether intervals of high species richness corresponded with elevated sediment accumulation and fossil burial in response to tectonic deformation, is published by Loughney et al. (2021).
- A study aiming to estimate the completeness of the mammalian fossil record in the Miocene is published by Žliobaitė & Fortelius (2021).
- A study aiming to determine whether changes in geographic range that could result from human impacts have altered the climatic niches of 46 species of mammals within the contiguous United States, based on data from the fossil record, is published by Pineda-Munoz et al. (2021).
- A study assessing the accuracy of bite force estimates in extinct mammals and archosaurs is published by Sakamoto (2021).
- A study on the lower carnassial morphology and the evolution of carnassial teeth in mammals, based on data from teeth of carnivorans, hyaenodonts and dasyuromorph marsupials, is published by Lang, Engler & Martin (2021).
