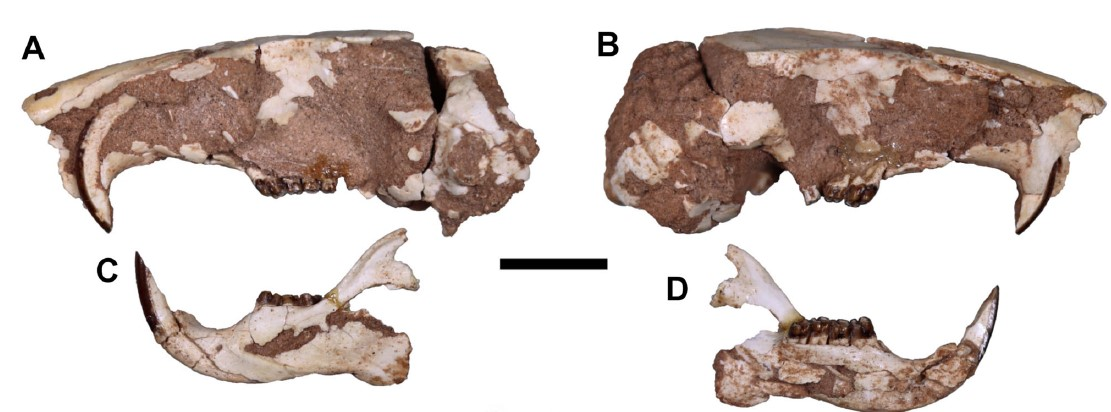
- Holotype skull

Scientific classification
- Kingdom: Animalia
- Phylum: Chordata
- Class: Mammalia
- Infraclass: Placentalia
- Order: Rodentia
- Superfamily: Geomyoidea
- Genus: †Farangimys; Calede & Socki, 2025
- Species: †F. megalotrogos

Binomial name
- †Farangimys megalotrogos Calede & Socki, 2025

= Farangimys =

Farangimys Temporal range: Neogene

Extinct genus of rodent

Farangimys is an extinct genus of geomyoid known from the Neogene Pawnee Creek Beds of Colorado, United States. The genus contains a single species, Farangimys megalotrogos.
