= Reinomys =

Reinomys Temporal range: Early Eocene

Scientific classification
- Domain: Eukaryota
- Kingdom: Animalia
- Phylum: Chordata
- Class: Mammalia
- Order: Rodentia
- Infraorder: †Theridomorpha
- Genus: †Reinomys; Vianey-Liaud & Marivaux, 2021
- Species: †R. rhomboides

Binomial name
- †Reinomys rhomboides Vianey-Liaud & Marivaux, 2021

Extinct genus of rodents

Reinomys is an extinct genus of Palaeogene rodents of unclear affinities belonging to the infraorder Theridomorpha. The genus and its only known species Reinomys rhomboides were both named by the French palaeontologists Monique Vianey-Liaud and Laurent Marivaux in 2021 based on some lower molars from the French locality of Avenay that dates back to the later early Eocene. It is diagnosed as being similar in size to another basal rodent Sparnacomys but differing based on specific traits of the tooth surfaces and cusps.

Within the locality of Avenay (MP8 + 9 of the Mammal Palaeogene zones), Reinomys would have coexisted with other contemporary faunas known from the deposit such as the ischyromyid Pseudoparamys, eulipotyphlans Macrocranion and Leptacodon, and the proviverrine Morlodon.
