= Scalaridelphys =

Scalaridelphys Temporal range: Late Cretaceous, Turonian

Scientific classification
- Kingdom: Animalia
- Phylum: Chordata
- Class: Mammalia
- Order: †Pediomyoidea
- Family: †Aquiladelphidae
- Genus: †Scalaridelphys; Cohen, Davis & Cifelli, 2021

Species
- †S. aquilana Cohen, Davis & Cifelli, 2020; †S. martini Cohen, Davis & Cifelli, 2020 (type species)

Synonyms
- †Scalaria Cohen, Davis & Cifelli, 2020 (preoccupied)

Extinct genus of mammals

Scalaridelphys (meaning "womb that resembles stairs"—in reference to the Grand Staircase–Escalante National Monument and the fact that it was related to extant marsupials) is an extinct genus of aquiladelphid pediomyoid mammal from the Late Cretaceous (Turonian)-aged Straight Cliffs Formation of Utah. Initially named as Scalaria in 2020, the genus name was changed to Scalaridelphys in 2021 when the authors were told by B. Creisler that the name Scalaria was already in use for a now-obsolete genus of gastropod named by Jean-Baptiste Lamarck in 1801. Two species of Scalaridelphys are known: the type species S. martini and S. aquilana.
