= Pannoniamys =

Pannoniamys Temporal range: Late Oligocene

Scientific classification
- Kingdom: Animalia
- Phylum: Chordata
- Class: Mammalia
- Infraclass: Placentalia
- Order: Rodentia
- Family: Spalacidae
- Genus: †Pannoniamys; Van de Weerd et al., 2021
- Species: †P. paragovensis

Binomial name
- †Pannoniamys paragovensis Van de Weerd et al., 2021

Genus of spalacid

Pannoniamys is an extinct genus of spalacid that inhabited Serbia during the Late Oligocene. It contains the species P. paragovensis.
