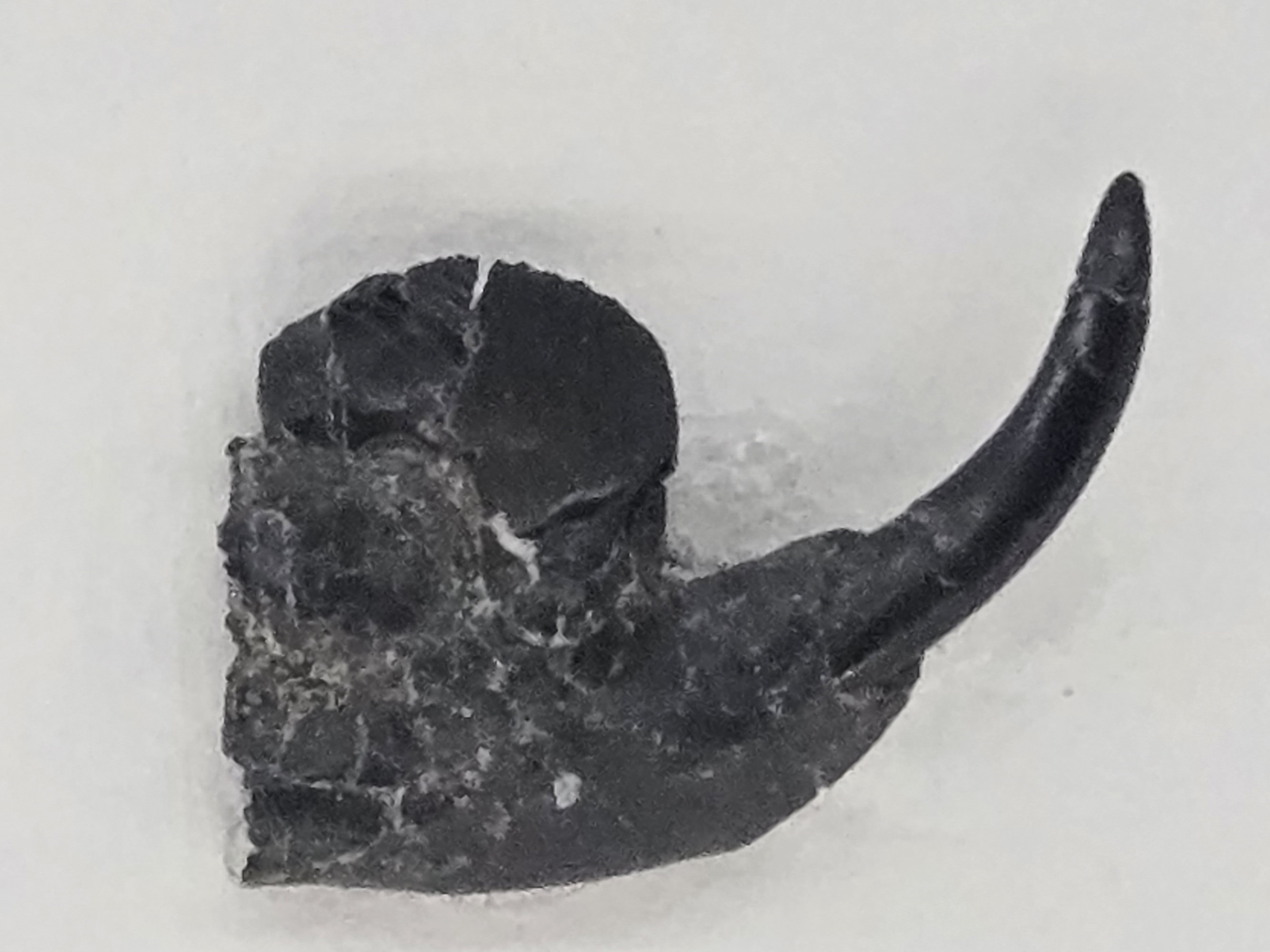
- Partial lower jaw

Scientific classification
- Kingdom: Animalia
- Phylum: Chordata
- Class: Mammalia
- Order: †Multituberculata
- Family: †Ptilodontidae
- Genus: †Aenigmamys
- Species: †A. aries

Binomial name
- †Aenigmamys aries Scott, 2021

= Aenigmamys =

Aenigmamys Temporal range: Early Palaeocene

Extinct genus of mammals

Aenigmamys is an extinct genus of ptilodontid that lived during the Danian stage of the Palaeocene epoch. It contains the single species Aenigmamys aries.

== Distribution ==
Aenigmamys aries is known from fossils from the Willow Creek Formation of Alberta.
