= Oaxacagale =

Oaxacagale Temporal range: Late Eocene

Scientific classification
- Kingdom: Animalia
- Phylum: Chordata
- Class: Mammalia
- Order: Carnivora
- Family: Mustelidae
- Genus: †Oaxacagale; Ferrusquía-Villafranca & Wang, 2021

Species
- †O. ruizi

Extinct genus of weasel

Oaxacagale is an extinct weasel genus of Mustelidae that lived in the Eocene in North America. It is thought to have resembled the extant Mustela frenata.

== Fossils ==
The skull of Oaxacagale was found in Mexico in Yolomécatl Formation and is estimated to be 40.3 million years old. It was found in the same fossil-bearing unit as Douglassciurus oaxacaensi and Protozetamys mixtecus.

Species of Oaxacagale
| Species | Time span | Author | Discovered |
|---|---|---|---|
| Oaxacagale ruizi | Late Eocene | Ferrusquía-Villafranca & Wang | 2021 |
