= Caecocricetodon =

Caecocricetodon Temporal range: Early Oligocene

Scientific classification
- Kingdom: Animalia
- Phylum: Chordata
- Class: Mammalia
- Infraclass: Placentalia
- Order: Rodentia
- Family: Cricetidae
- Genus: †Caecocricetodon; Lu et al., 2021
- Species: †C. yani

Binomial name
- †Caecocricetodon yani Lu et al., 2021

Extinct genus of mammal

Caecocricetodon is an extinct genus of the cricetid that lived during the Rupelian stage of the Oligocene epoch. The genus is known from fossil material recovered from the Caijiachong Formation in China, near the village of Caijiachong in Qujing County. It contains a single species, Caecocricetodon yani, described in 2021.

== Taxonomy ==
Caecocricetodon was described by Xiao-Yu Lu, Xijun Ni, and Olivier Maridet in 2021 based on dental and cranial material. Phylogenetic analysis places it within the subfamily Paracricetodontinae, forming a monophyletic clade with Paracricetodon and Trakymys.

=== Etymology ===
The genus name is derived from Latin caecus ("blind" or "obscure") and the genus Cricetodon, referring to the obscured molar morphology. The species epithet yani honors Zhou-Liang Yan for his assistance in fieldwork.

== Description ==
Caecocricetodon yani, the type species, is known from the Caijiachong Formation of China. It is distinguished by its medium-sized, low-crowned, and strongly lophodont cheek teeth. The upper and lower molars feature numerous additional crests and spurs, forming highly variable and complex occlusal patterns. This dental morphology superficially resembles that of glirids (dormice), although Caecocricetodon is not closely related to Gliridae and the similarity is interpreted as an example of convergent evolution. The features suggest possible adaptation to an arboreal lifestyle and a diet composed of soft but mechanically resistant food such as seeds and fruit.

== Paleoenvironment ==
Fossils were recovered from early Oligocene sediments in the Caijiachong Formation. The associated fauna, including primates and tree shrews, indicates a warm, forested environment. This contrasts with contemporaneous arid faunas in northern Asia and supports the hypothesis that Caecocricetodon inhabited a closed-canopy forest ecosystem.
