= Webbochoerus =

Webbochoerus Temporal range: Tortonian

Scientific classification
- Kingdom: Animalia
- Phylum: Chordata
- Class: Mammalia
- Order: Artiodactyla
- Family: Tayassuidae
- Genus: †Webbochoerus
- Species: †W. macfaddeni

Binomial name
- †Webbochoerus macfaddeni Prothero, 2021

Extinct genus of mammals

Webbochoerus is an extinct genus of tayassuid that lived during the Tortonian stage of the Miocene epoch.

== Distribution ==
Webbochoerus macfaddeni is known from the Clarendonian Love Bone Bed of Florida.
