= Dimidiomeryx =

Scientific classification
- Kingdom: Animalia
- Phylum: Chordata
- Class: Mammalia
- Infraclass: Placentalia
- Order: Artiodactyla
- Family: Moschidae
- Genus: †Dimidiomeryx
- Species: †D. xishuiensis

Binomial name
- †Dimidiomeryx xishuiensis Sánchez et al., 2024

Extinct genus of mammals

Dimidiomeryx is an extinct genus of moschid found in Asia during the Miocene epoch. It is a monotypic genus known from a single species, D. xishuiensis.
