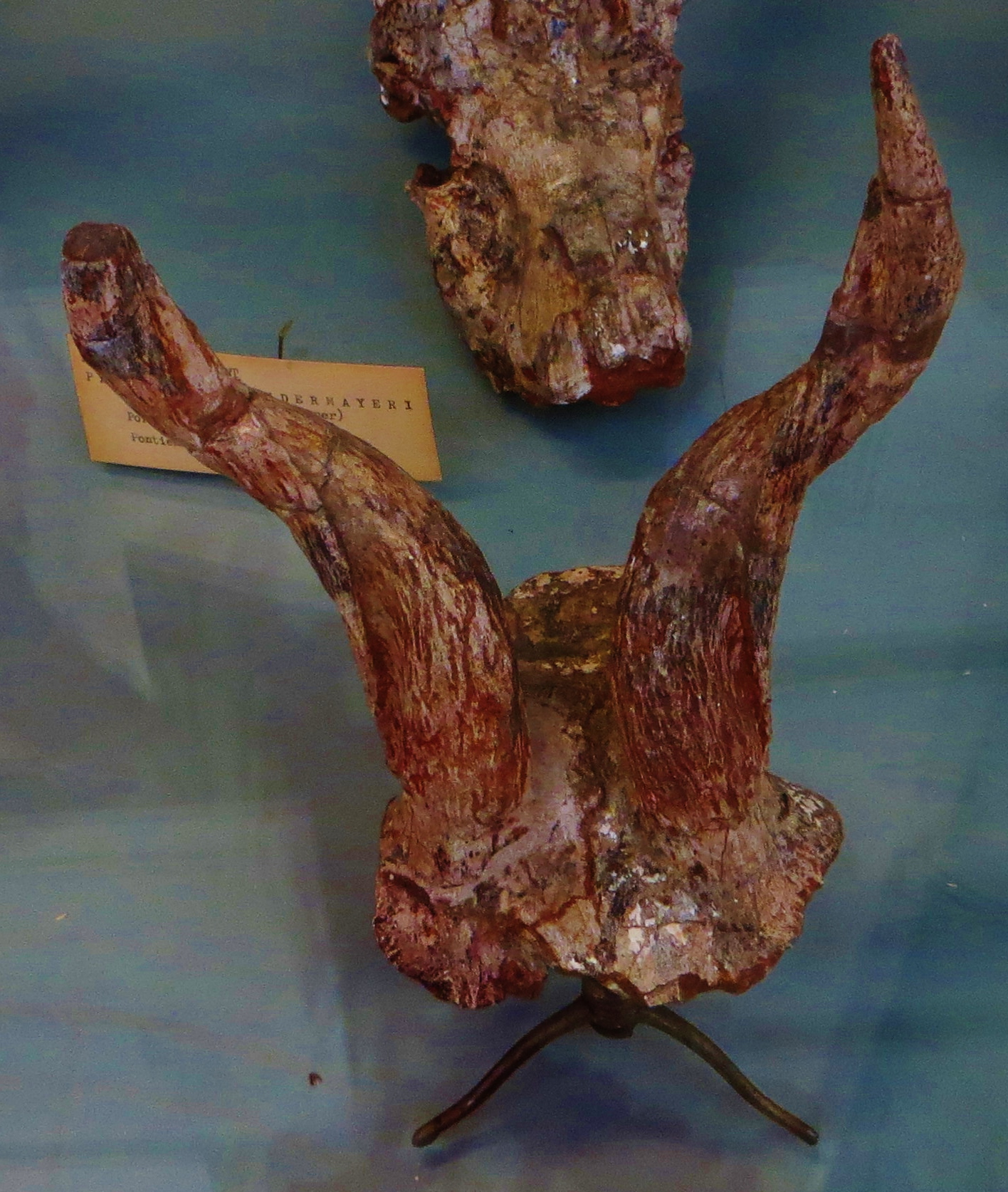
- Oioceros rothii

Scientific classification
- Kingdom: Animalia
- Phylum: Chordata
- Class: Mammalia
- Order: Artiodactyla
- Family: Bovidae
- Genus: †Oioceros; Gaillard, 1901

Type species
- †Oioceros rothii

Species
- O. rothii O. atropatenes O. jiulongkouensis O. noverca O. robustus O. stenocephalus O. lishanensis O. wegneri O. tanyceras

= Oioceros =

Oioceros Temporal range: late Miocene

Extinct genus of mammals

Oioceros is an extinct genus of spiral-horned antelope from the late Miocene. Its fossils have been found in Greece, China, Iran, and Africa. It was first discovered by Wagner in 1857, and contains nine species, O. rothii, O. atropatenes, O. jiulongkouensis, O. noverca, O. robustus, O. stenocephalus, O. lishanensis, O. wegneri, and O. tanyceras. Former species include O. grangeri (Pilgrim, 1934), now recognized as the genus Sinomegoceros, and O. xiejiaensis (Li and Qui; 1980), now recognized as the genus Sinopalaeoceros.

Oioceros somewhat resembled a gazelle.

== Description ==
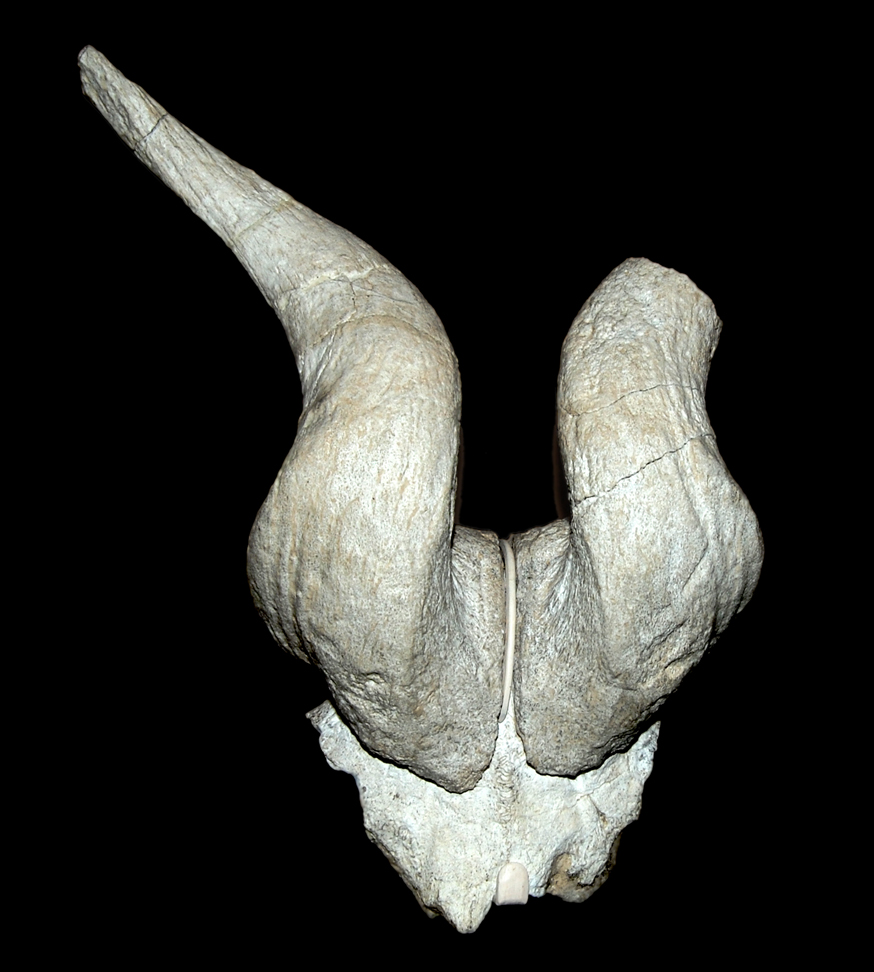
Horns

In 1997, an almost complete skull of O. rothii proved that it was similar to Samotragus praecursor, with a short face, compared to its relatively long braincase, and isolated horn cores. However, unlike S. praecursor, O. rothii had a jaw of primarily premolar teeth, which were longer than the molars found in the latter. Pilgrim and Hopwood described the genus as being "small size with long slender muzzle; face bent down on basicranial axis either slightly or to a moderate extent; orbits with expanded orbital roof; horn-cores twisted counter-clockwise in a fairly close spiral of one or two revolutions, widely separate, tilted backward or fairly upright, divergent, with a cross-section almost circular or elliptical, keeled either anteriorly or posteriorly or both; dentition moderately hypsodont, premolar series rather long and slender, molars broad with ribs of medium strength" (Pilgrim and Hopwood, 1928, p. 24). The horn cores of Oioceros have a torsion.

== Species ==
- Oioceros rothii was first named by Wagner in 1857. He originally had the specimen he had found in Pikermi, Greece, under the name "Antilope rothii". In 1901, Gaillard reassigned the species to Oioceros rothii.
- Oioceros atropatenes was first named by Rodler & Weithofer in 1890.
- Oioceros jiulongkouensis was first named by G. Chen and W. Wu in 1976.
- Oioceros noverca was first named by Pilgrim in 1934.
- Oioceros robustus was first named by Chen and Wu in 1976.
- Oioceros stenocephalus was first named by Chen and Wu in 1976.
- Oioceros wegneri was first named by Andree in 1926. It possibly represents an entirely different genus of sheep.
- Oioceros tanyceras was first named by Gentry in 1970 from the Miocene site of Fort Ternan, Kenya. It has alternatively been placed in the genus Hypsodontus.

== Palaeobiology ==
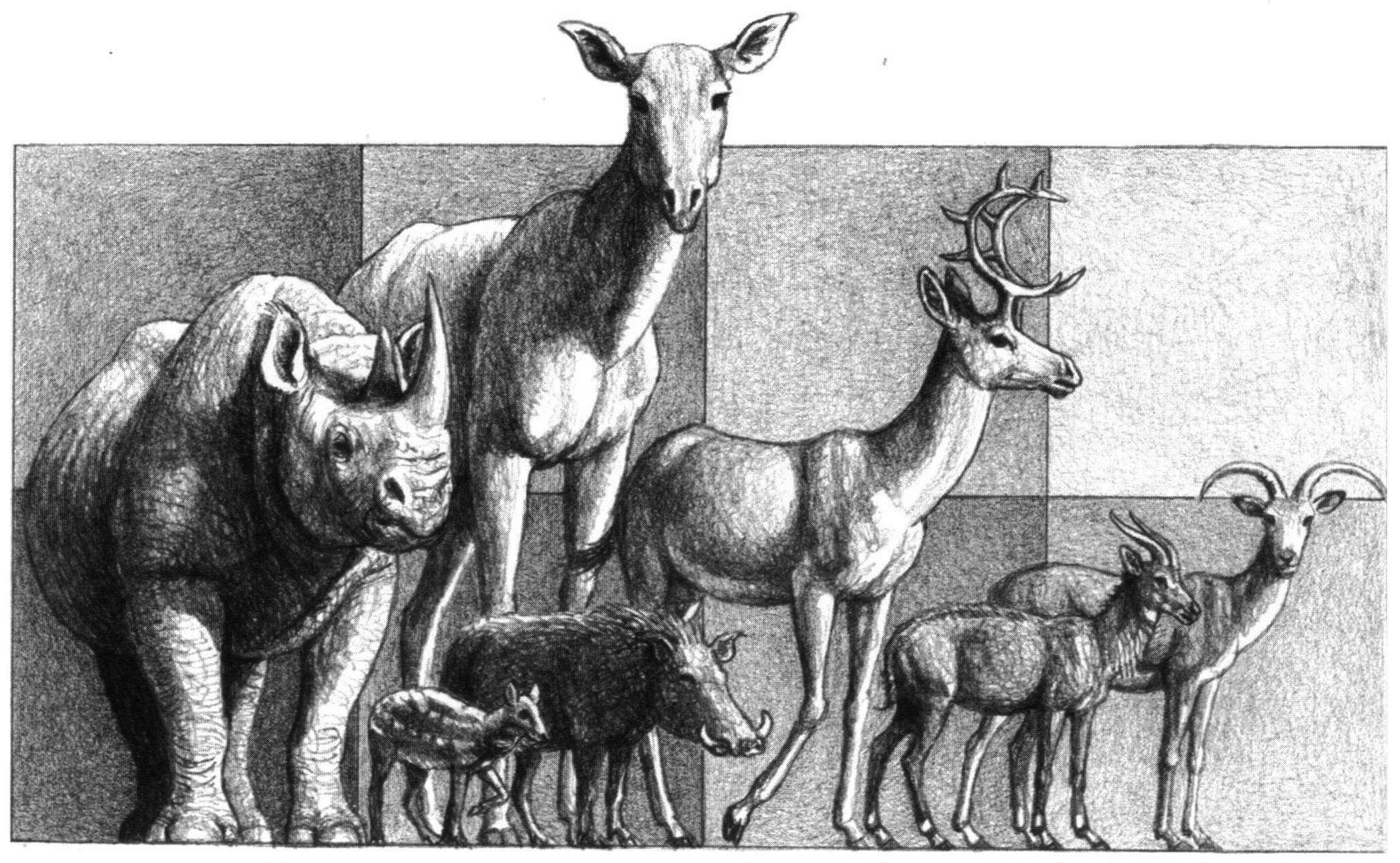
Eastern African mid-Miocene ungulates, including Oioceros (right)

=== Palaeoecology ===
The dental microwear patterns of O. wegneri indicates members of this species were browsing herbivores, while those of O. rothii and O. kuhlmanni show a signal indicating they were mixed feeders.
