= Rukwasengi =

Rukwasengi Temporal range: Oligocene

Scientific classification
- Kingdom: Animalia
- Phylum: Chordata
- Class: Mammalia
- Order: Macroscelidea
- Family: †Myohyracidae
- Genus: †Rukwasengi; Stevens et al., 2021
- Species: †R. butleri

Binomial name
- †Rukwasengi butleri Stevens et al., 2021

Extinct genus of mammals

Rukwasengi is an extinct genus of myohyracine that inhabited Tanzania during the Oligocene epoch. It contains a single species, Rukwasengi butleri.
