= Oligorhynchocyon =

Oligorhynchocyon Temporal range: Late Oligocene

Scientific classification
- Kingdom: Animalia
- Phylum: Chordata
- Class: Mammalia
- Infraclass: Placentalia
- Order: Macroscelidea
- Family: Macroscelididae
- Subfamily: †Rhynchocyoninae
- Genus: †Oligorhynchocyon
- Species: †O. songwensis

Binomial name
- †Oligorhynchocyon songwensis Stevens et al., 2022

Extinct genus of mammals

Oligorhynchocyon is an extinct genus of rhynchocyonine sengi that lived in Tanzania during the Chattian. It contains the species O. songwensis.
