= Klimonas =

Coordinates: 34°42′45.18″N 33°8′1.45″E

Klimonas is an archaeological site dating to the 9th millennium BC. Discovered in Cyprus at Ayios Tychonas in the Limassol District, Klimonas is the oldest known farming village in the world. The main part of the site is a subterranean circular building approximately ten metres (~40 feet) in diameter similar to communal buildings in other nearby sites.

Wild boar was hunted and cereals were obtained from the Levant, as well as cats and domesticated dogs. The dogs were used for hunting the boar.
