= Megalomys camerhogne =

Megalomys camerhogne Temporal range: Holocene

Scientific classification
- Kingdom: Animalia
- Phylum: Chordata
- Class: Mammalia
- Order: Rodentia
- Family: Cricetidae
- Subfamily: Sigmodontinae
- Genus: †Megalomys
- Species: †M. camerhogne

Binomial name
- †Megalomys camerhogne Mistretta, Giovas, Weksler & Turvey, 2021

Extinct species of rodent

Megalomys camerhogne is an extinct species of giant rice rat from Grenada in the genus Megalomys. It is known only from Pearls, an archeological site in Saint Andrew dated to about 400 to 1650 CE. Though there are no historical records of its occurrence on Grenada, it is likely that the species survived until European contact in the 16th century. Its extinction may be related to competition with black rats (Rattus rattus) or to predation by the small Indian mongoose (Urva javanica), which was introduced to Grenada in the 1870s.

The known material of M. camerhogne is limited: four lower jaws, one still holding the first molar; two isolated first molars; an incisor; and more than a dozen postcranial bones. Based on the size of the preserved elements, it was the largest known species of Megalomys, slightly larger than Megalomys desmarestii from Martinique. Other diagnostic characters include the number of roots on the molars (four on the first, three on the second, and two on the third) and the well-developed capsular process of the lower incisor.
