= Kennedycetus =

Kennedycetus Temporal range: Late Miocene

Scientific classification
- Kingdom: Animalia
- Phylum: Chordata
- Class: Mammalia
- Infraclass: Placentalia
- Order: Artiodactyla
- Infraorder: Cetacea
- Superfamily: Balaenopteroidea
- Genus: †Kennedycetus
- Species: †K. pericorum

Binomial name
- †Kennedycetus pericorum Solis-Añorve et al., 2021

Extinct genus of cetaceans

Kennedycetus is an extinct genus of balaenopteroid that inhabited Mexico during the Late Miocene. It contains the species K. pericorum.
