= Gangraia =

Gangraia Temporal range: Miocene

Scientific classification
- Kingdom: Animalia
- Phylum: Chordata
- Class: Mammalia
- Infraclass: Placentalia
- Order: Artiodactyla
- Family: Bovidae
- Genus: †Gangraia; Kostopoulos et al., 2021
- Species: †G. anatolica

Binomial name
- †Gangraia anatolica Kostopoulos et al., 2021

Extinct genus of mammals

Gangraia is an extinct genus of bovid that lived in Turkey during the Miocene epoch. It is known from a single species, Gangraia anatolica.
