= Kızılırmak Formation =

Geologic formation in Turkey

- Stratigraphic range: Late Oligocene, Chattian 29–23 Ma
- Type: Formation
- Unit of: Çankırı-Çorum Basin
- Underlies: Kilçak Formation
- Overlies: Güvendik Formation
- Thickness: 120 metres (390 ft)

Lithology
- Primary: mudstone, sandstone
- Other: conglomerate, claystone, gypsum, coal

Location
- Region: Central Anatolia
- Country: Turkey

Type section
- Named for: Kızılırmak district

The Kızılırmak (Turkish pronunciation: [kɯzɯlɯrmak]) Formation is a geological formation located in Turkey that contains fossils from the Late Oligocene Suevian and Arvernian. It is part of the lower Çankırı-Çorum Basin, overlying the Güvendik Formation and underlying the Kilçak Formation.

== Geology ==
The Kızılırmak Formation is named for the formation's type locality found in the Kızılırmak district of Turkey. Its depth is between 110 and 120 (361– 390 ft) meters in different sections of the formation and is mainly made up of mudstones, bedded sandstones, and bedded conglomerate. Some of these sections also contain gypsum deposits.

Throughout the formation, there is a general trend of seeing finer sediments as one moves upwards in the sequence. These mostly appear in the western sections where rivers would have dominated the area. Whereas towards the center of the basin, the strata are more dominated by facies more indicative of floodplain and shallow lake deposits.

== Paleobiota ==
=== Artiodactyla ===
Genus	Species	Notes	Image
Dremotherium	D. guthi	A poorly known artiodactyl, it's smaller than another species within the genus, D. feignouxi. The material from the Kızılırmak Formation is the earliest known material of the species.	
Palaeohypsodontus	cf. P. sp.	A potential bovid that is most closely referable to this genus due to dental characters of a fragmentary upper molar.	
Iberomeryx	I. parvus	A tragulid known from cranial along with fragmentary postcranial material which resembles the living genus tragulus. It's the most common ruminant at the formation.	
Iberomeryx	I. sp	An indeterminate species within the genus larger than I. parvus	
Lophiomerycidae indet.		An indeterminate lophiomerycid known from limb material along with a tooth which is most similar to Lophiomeryx chalaniati. The animal would have been slightly larger than Iberomeryx but smaller than L. chalaniati.	
Pecora indet.		An indeterminate pecoran known from a single astragalus that is much larger than both iberomeryx and the liphomerycid material from the formation.	

=== Perissodactyla ===
Genus	Species	Notes	Image
Paraceratherium	P. sp	A paraceratheriid known from the proximal end of a humerus that closely resembles that seen in the genus. The material seems to be from an adult individual.	
Protaceratherium	P. cf. P. albigense	A large rhinocerotid known from a fragmentary magnum that is similar to that seen in P. albigense.	

=== Rodentia ===
Genus	Species	Notes	Image
Bransatoglis	B. cf. sjeni	A rare gliridae known from multiple cheek teeth that are the same size as seen in B.sjeni though it does lack some morphology seen the type specimen.	
Daxneria	D. fragilis	A large baluchimyine rodent known from dentition.	
Eucricetodon	E. ruber	A murid that's a smaller member of the genus, the same as E. oculatus ignoring size.	
Eucricetodon	E. oculatus	A murid that's a smaller member of the genus but larger than E. ruber.	
Sayimys	S. sp.	A ctenodactylidae known from multiple molars that is most similar to Sayimys obliquidens. However, due to doubts of the age and location of the type locality of S. obliquidens, it was decided to leave the classification as Sayimys sp.	
