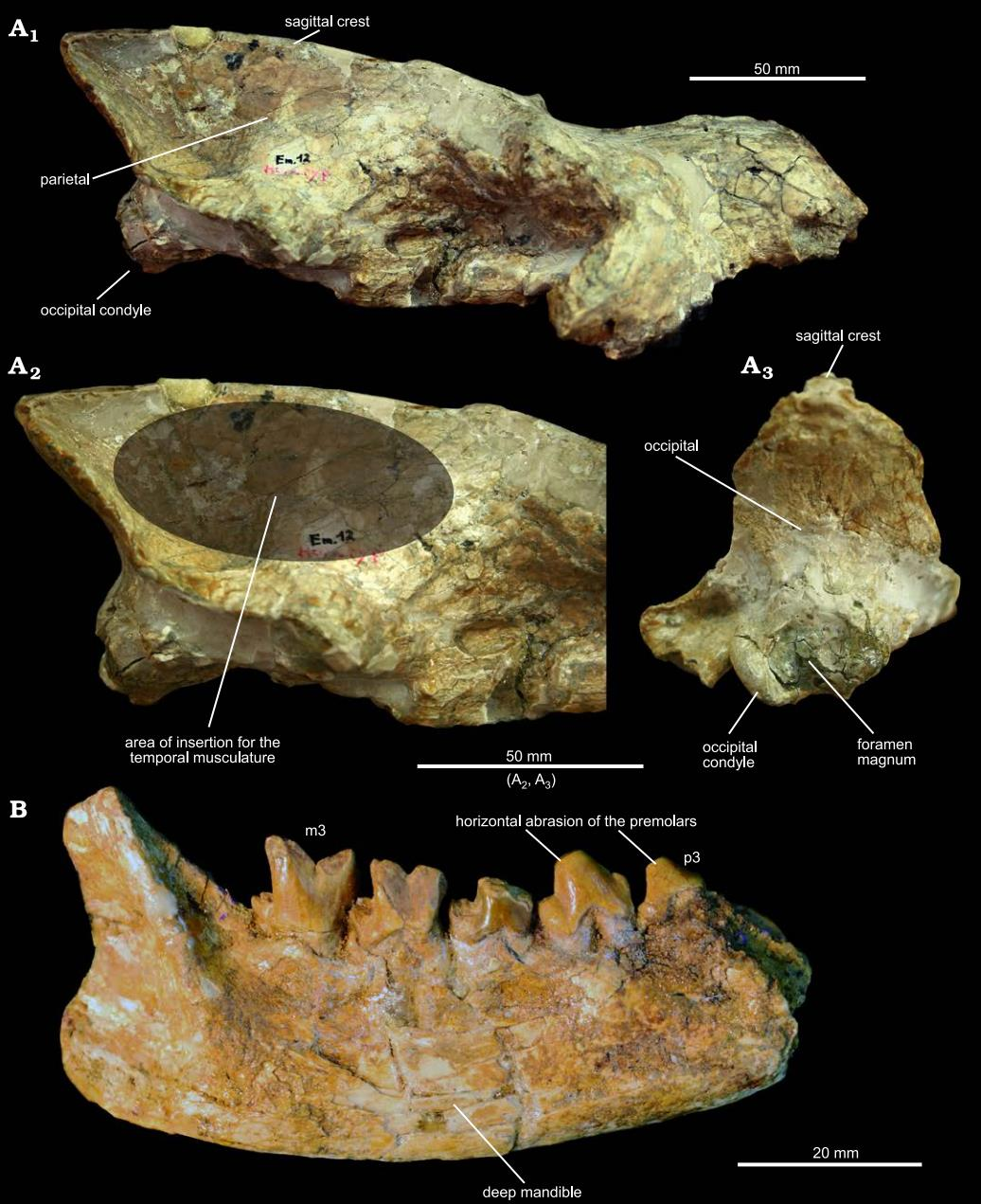
- skull and mandible of Eurotherium theriodis

Scientific classification
- Kingdom: Animalia
- Phylum: Chordata
- Class: Mammalia
- Infraclass: Placentalia
- Order: †Hyaenodonta
- Superfamily: †Hyaenodontoidea
- Family: †Hyaenodontidae
- Genus: †Eurotherium; Polly and Lange-Badré, 1993

Type species
- †Eurotherium theriodis Van Valen, 1965

Species
- †E. mapplethorpei (Solé, 2021); †E. matthesi (Lange-Badré & Haubold, 1990); †E. theriodis (Van Valen, 1965)

Synonyms
- synonyms of species: E. matthesi: Allopterodon matthesi (Lange-Badré & Haubold, 1990); Prodissopsalis voigti (Matthes, 1967); E. theriodis: Allopterodon theriodis (Lange-Badré & Haubold, 1990); Prodissopsalis theriodis (Van Valen, 1965)

= Eurotherium =

Eurotherium Temporal range: 50.8–41.2 Ma Early to Middle Eocene

Genus of mammals (fossil)

Eurotherium ("european beast") is an extinct paraphyletic genus of placental mammals from the extinct family Hyaenodontidae that lived from the Early to Middle Eocene in Europe.

== Palaeoecology ==
Based on the size of its turbinates, E. theriodis is believed to have been a scavenger.
