= Theridomorpha =

Theridomorpha Temporal range: Early Eocene–Late Eocene

Scientific classification
- Domain: Eukaryota
- Kingdom: Animalia
- Phylum: Chordata
- Class: Mammalia
- Order: Rodentia
- Infraorder: †Theridomorpha; Lavocat, 1955

Families
- †Euromyidae; †Masillamyidae; †Theridomyoidea; †Theridomyidae; †Pseudosciuridae

Extinct infraorder of rodents

Theridomorpha is an extinct clade of Palaeogene rodents that were endemic to western Europe and lived from the early Eocene to the late Oligocene. It is proposed to belong to the suborder Ischyromyiformes, of which the Gliridae is the sole surviving family, and contains the families Euromyidae, Masillamyidae, Theridomyidae, and Pseudosciuridae. Theridomorphs had wide variations in both their tooth crown heights and their surface patterns, namely bunodont, lophodont, or selenodont dentitions. Whereas Eocene species had brachyodont, or low-crowned, to slightly hypsodont (higher-crowned) dentitions, Oligocene species tended to have more semi-hypsodont dentitions. Theridomorphs ranged in size from small field mice at 50 g (1.8 oz) to muskrats at 1 kg (2.2 lb).

Theridomorphs were the most diverse rodent groups in Europe by the late Eocene but experienced some extents of diversity decline by the Oligocene. Despite this, theridomyids remained a diverse group in the early Oligocene, surviving until the late Oligocene.
