= Ferris Formation =

Geologic formation in Wyoming

- Stratigraphic range: Maastrichtian-Danian; ~67–63 Ma
- Type: Geological formation
- Underlies: Hanna Formation
- Overlies: Medicine Bow Formation
- Thickness: 600–2,000 m (2,000–6,600 ft)

Lithology
- Primary: Mudstone
- Other: Sandstone

Location
- Coordinates: 41.8°N 106.6°W
- Approximate paleocoordinates: 48.8°N 82.2°W
- Region: Wyoming
- Country: United States
- Extent: Hanna Basin
- Ferris Formation (the United States) Ferris Formation (Wyoming)

The Ferris Formation is an Upper Cretaceous (~67-66 Ma) to Paleocene (66-63 Ma), fluvial-deltaic geological formation in southern Wyoming. It contains a variety of trace and body fossils, preserved in sandy fluvial channel deposits and overbank units. Diverse vertebrate fossils have been reported from the formation.

The Ferris Formation is up to 2,000 metres (6,600 ft) thick in the Hanna Basin and represents a rapid accumulation of predominantly fine-grained sediment on a broad deltaic and fluvial environments. Some of the fluvial channels contain evidence of tidal influence and brackish water, in the form of tidal facies, shark teeth, and crustacean burrows, which demonstrates that the western shoreline of the Western Interior Sea was close in proximity to the Hanna Basin even during the latest Cretaceous. The local K-T boundary is contained within a sandy channel deposit made up of stacked bars. Reworked Cretaceous fossils are preserved at the base of the channel complex, associated with mud rip-up clasts, and Paleocene mammal fossils are preserved in the upper portion of the bar.

== Fossils ==
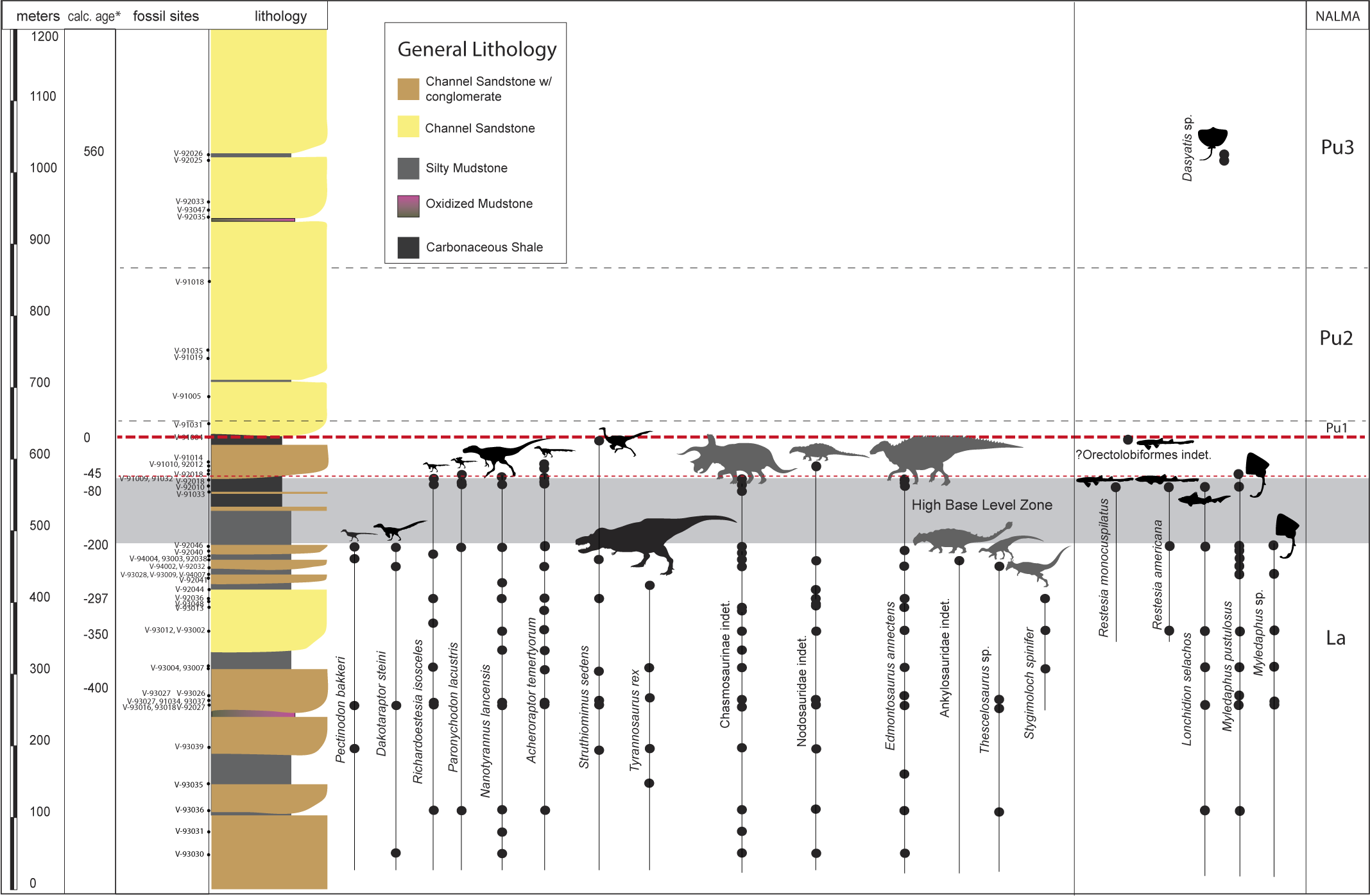
Stratigraphic occurrence of dinosaurs and cartilaginous fish through the Ferris Formation

Color key: Taxon / Reclassified taxon / Taxon falsely reported as present / Dubious taxon or junior synonym / Ichnotaxon / Ootaxon / Morphotaxon	Notes; Uncertain or tentative taxa are in small text; ~~crossed out~~ taxa are discredited.

Diverse vertebrate fossils have been reported from the Ferris Formation, spanning to from Lancian (Cretaceous) to Puercan (Paleocene). Systematics of mammalian fossil records are based on Lillegraven & Eberle (1999), while non-mammalian vertebrate fossil records are based on Wroblewski (2026).

=== Chondrichthyians ===
Chondrichthyians of the Ferris Formation
Genus	Species	Location	Stratigraphic position	Abundance	Notes	Images
Dasyatis	D. sp.		Puercan			
Lonchidion	L. selachos		Lancian			
Myledaphus	M. pustulatus; M. sp.		Lancian			
Orectolobiformes	Indeterminate		Lancian			
Restesia	R. monocuspilatus; R. americana		Lancian			

=== Actinopterygians ===
Actinopterygians of the Ferris Formation
Genus	Species	Location	Stratigraphic position	Abundance	Notes	Images
Amiidae	Indeterminate		Lancian to Puercan			
Lepisosteidae	Indeterminate		Lancian to Puercan			
Phyllodus	P. paulkatoi		Lancian			
Platacodon	P. sp.		Lancian			
Teleostei	Indeterminate		Lancian to Puercan			

=== Amphibians ===
Amphibians of the Ferris Formation
Genus	Species	Location	Stratigraphic position	Abundance	Notes	Images
Caudata	Indeterminate		Lancian			
Habrosaurus	H. dilatus		Lancian			

=== Squamates ===
Lizards of the Ferris Formation
Genus	Species	Location	Stratigraphic position	Abundance	Notes	Images
cf. Odaxosaurus	cf. O. piger		Lancian			
Squamata	Indeterminate		Lancian to Puercan			

=== Testudines ===
Turtles of the Ferris Formation
Genus	Species	Location	Stratigraphic position	Abundance	Notes	Images
Adocus	A. sp.		Lancian			
Baenidae	Indeterminate		Lancian to Puercan			
Basilemys	B. sp.		Lancian			
Chelonia	Indeterminate		Lancian			
Compsemys	C. victus		Lancian			
Trionychidae	Indeterminate		Lancian to Puercan			

=== Choristoderans ===
Choristoderans of the Ferris Formation
Genus	Species	Location	Stratigraphic position	Abundance	Notes	Images
Champsosaurus	C. sp.		Lancian to Puercan			

=== Crocodylomorphs ===
Crocodylomorphs of the Ferris Formation
Genus	Species	Location	Stratigraphic position	Abundance	Notes	Images
Alligatoroidea	Indeterminate		Lancian to Puercan			
cf. Borealosuchus	cf. B. sp.		Lancian			
Navajosuchus	N. mooki		Puercan			

=== Dinosaurs ===
==== Ornithischians ====
Ornithischians of the Ferris Formation
Genus	Species	Location	Stratigraphic position	Abundance	Notes	Images
Ankylosauridae	Indeterminate		Lancian		Some specimens originally assigned to Ankylosaurus and Edmontonia.	
Chasmosaurinae	Indeterminate		Lancian		Originally assigned to Triceratops.	
Edmontosaurus	E. annectens		Lancian			
Nodosauridae	Indeterminate		Lancian		Some specimens originally assigned to Ankylosaurus and Edmontonia.	
Ornithischia	Indeterminate		Lancian			
Stygimoloch	S. spinifer		Lancian		Some specimens originally identified as thescelosaurids.	
Thescelosaurus	T. sp.		Lancian			

==== Saurischians ====
Saurischians of the Ferris Formation
Genus	Species	Location	Stratigraphic position	Abundance	Notes	Images
Acheroraptor	A. temertyorum		Lancian		Some specimens originally assigned to Paronychodon and Saurornitholestes.	
Dakotaraptor	D. steini		Lancian		Some specimens originally assigned to Aublysodon, Dromaeosaurus and Saurornitholestes.	
Deinonychosauria	Indeterminate		Lancian			
Nanotyrannus	N. lancensis		Lancian		Specimens originally assigned to Aublysodon.	
Paronychodon	P. lacustris		Lancian			
Pectinodon	P. bakkeri		Lancian		Some specimens originally assigned to Troodon.	
Richardoestesia	R. isosceles		Lancian		Some specimens originally assigned to Saurornitholestes.	
Struthiomimus	S. sedens		Lancian		Some specimens originally assigned to Ornithomimus.	
Theropoda	Indeterminate		Lancian			
Tyrannosauridae	Indeterminate		Lancian			
Tyrannosaurus	T. rex		Lancian			

=== Mammals ===
==== Eutherians ====
Eutherians of the Ferris Formation
Genus	Species	Location	Stratigraphic position	Abundance	Notes	Images
Alticonus	A. gazini		Puercan			
Alveugena	A. carbonensis		Puercan			
Ampliconus	A. antoni; A. sp., cf. A. browni		Puercan			
Arctocyonidae	Indeterminate		Puercan			
Baioconodon	B. sp., cf. B. denverensis; B. middletoni; B. sp.		Puercan			
Carsioptychus	C. coarctatus		Puercan		Species originally assigned to Periptychus.	
Cimolestes	C. sp.; cf. C. sp.		Lancian to Puercan			
Conacodon	C. sp., cf. C. cophater; C. delphae; C. harbourae		Puercan			
"Condylartha"	Indeterminate		Puercan			
Ectoconus	E. cavigellii; E. ditrigonus; E. sp.		Puercan			
Eoconodon	E. sp.		Puercan			
Gypsonictops	G. sp., cf. illuminatus		Lancian			
Loxolophus	L. faulkneri; L. sp., cf. faulkneri; L. sp., cf. hyattianus; L. priscus; cf. L. sp.		Puercan			
Maiorana	M. ferrisensis		Puercan			
Mimatuta	M. sp.; cf. M. sp.		Puercan			
Mithrandir	M. gillianus; M. sp., cf. gillianus		Puercan			
Oxyacodon	O. sp., cf. O. agapetillus; O. apiculatus; O. priscilla		Puercan			
Oxyclaenus	O. cuspidatus; cf. O. sp.		Puercan			
Oxyprimus	O. galadrielae; O. sp.		Puercan			
Palaeoryctidae	Indeterminate		Puercan			
Periptychidae	Indeterminate		Puercan			
Procerberus	P. sp.		Puercan			
"Proteutheria"	Indeterminate		Puercan			
cf. Protoselene	cf. P. sp.		Puercan			
Protungulatum	P. donnae; P. sp., cf. donnae; P. gorgun; P. sloani		Puercan			
Valenia	V. wilsoni		Puercan		Species originally assigned to Promioclaenus.	

==== Metatherians ====
Metatherians of the Ferris Formation
Genus	Species	Location	Stratigraphic position	Abundance	Notes	Images
Peradectes	P. sp., cf. P. pusillus		Puercan			
Peradectidae	Indeterminate		Lancian			
Protalphadon	P. lulli; P. sp. cf. lulli		Lancian		Species originally assigned to Alphadon.	

==== Multituberculates ====
Multituberculates of the Ferris Formation
Genus	Species	Location	Stratigraphic position	Abundance	Notes	Images
Cimolodon	C. nitidus; C. sp., cf. nitidus		Lancian			
Ectypodus	E. sp. A; E. sp. B		Puercan			
Meniscoessus	M. seminoensis		Lancian			
Mesodma	M. ambigua; M. formosa; M. hensleighi; M. sp., cf. M. garfieldensis; M. sp.; ?M. sp.		Puercan			
Neoplagiaulacidae	Indeterminate		Lancian to Puercan			
Ptilodus	P. sp., cf. P. tsoiensis; P. sp.		Puercan			
Taeniolabis	T. taoensis		Puercan			
Valenopsalis	V. joyneri		Puercan		Species originally assigned to Catopsalis.	

== See also ==
- List of dinosaur-bearing rock formations
- Hell Creek Formation
- Fort Union Formation
