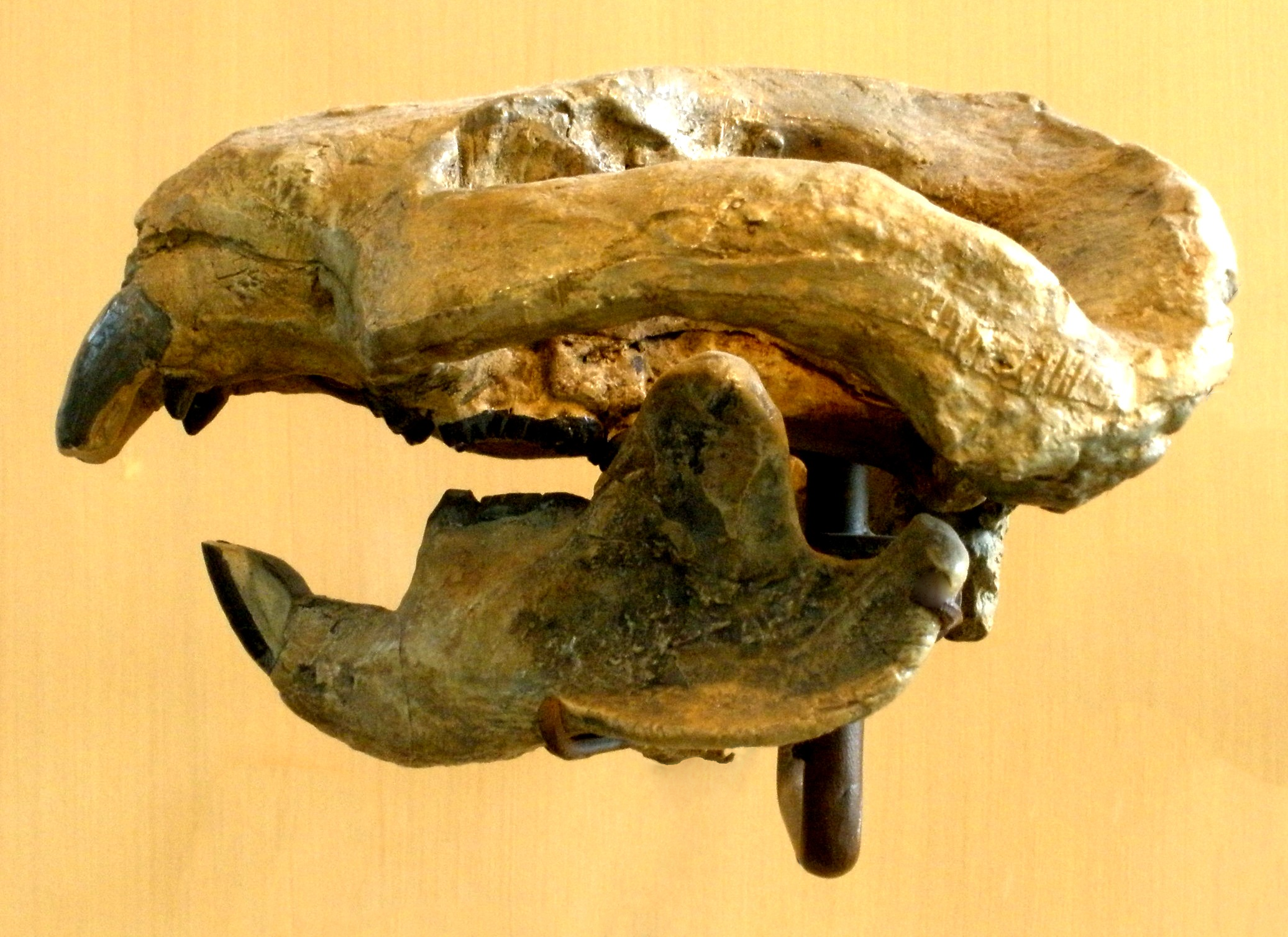
- Taeniolabis taoensis

Scientific classification
- Kingdom: Animalia
- Phylum: Chordata
- Class: Mammalia
- Order: †Multituberculata
- Superfamily: †Taeniolabidoidea
- Family: †Taeniolabididae; Granger & Simpson, 1929

Genera
- †Taeniolabis; †Kimbetopsalis

= Taeniolabididae =

Taeniolabididae Temporal range: 66–63 Ma Danian- Lower Paleocene

Extinct family of mammals

Taeniolabididae is one of the two multituberculate clades within Taeniolabidoidea. Originally basically synonymous with Taeniolabidoidea, it has more recently been found to be a specific clade including Kimbetopsalis, Taeniolabis and some former members of the Catopsalis wastebasket taxon, as opposed to Lambdopsalidae, which includes most other genera outside of Valenopsalis and possibly Bubodens, both of which more basal taxa.

Unlike the longer spanning lambdopsalids, taeniolabibids remained exclusive to the Puercan stage of North America and did not live longer nor spread into Asia. They were the largest of multituberculates, with Taeniolabis taoensis the largest at approximately 22.7 kilograms (50 lb) body mass.
