= Puercan =

North American faunal stage

The Puercan North American Stage on the geologic timescale is the first North American faunal stage of the Paleocene epoch, according to the North American Land Mammal Ages (NALMA) chronology. It spans an interval from around 66 to 65.1 million years ago.

The Puercan is the first of four NALMAs corresponding to the Paleocene, followed by the Torrejonian, Tiffanian, and Clarkforkian. The Puercan directly follows the Lancian NALMA, which corresponds to the Maastrichtian age of the Late Cretaceous. The K-Pg boundary and K-Pg mass extinction at 66 million years ago approximates the boundary between the Lancian and Puercan. The Puercan is followed by the Torrejonian NALMA stage.

== Mammal fauna ==
Few Puercan mammals are closely related to modern North American mammals, most belong to an early adaptive radiation in the aftermath of the K-Pg mass extinction. Some are holdovers from the Cretaceous, such as a diverse array of rodent-like multituberculates alongside marsupial-like mammals (such as Peradectes and Thylacodon) and cimolestans (such as Cimolestes). Other groups first appearing in North America during the Puercan include:

- Leptictidae (Prodiacodon, etc.), hopping insectivores
- Taeniodonta (Onychodectes, Wortmania, etc.), large stocky herbivores
- Purgatorius and Pandemonium, potential early relative of primates
- Ravenictis, a tiny early relative of carnivoran mammals
- "Condylarths", a broad category of omnivorous or herbivorous mammals potentially ancestral to later groups such as hoofed mammals and carnivorans.
  - "Arctocyonids" (Oxyclaenus, Chriacus, etc.), medium-sized omnivores
  - Periptychidae (Carsioptychus, Ectoconus, Oxyacodon, etc.), stocky terrestrial omnivores
  - Apheliscidae (Litomylus, etc.), small omnivores
  - Mioclaenidae (Promioclaenus, Bubogonia, etc.), small omnivores
  - Triisodontidae (Eoconodon, etc.), stocky terrestrial carnivores
Puercan mammals

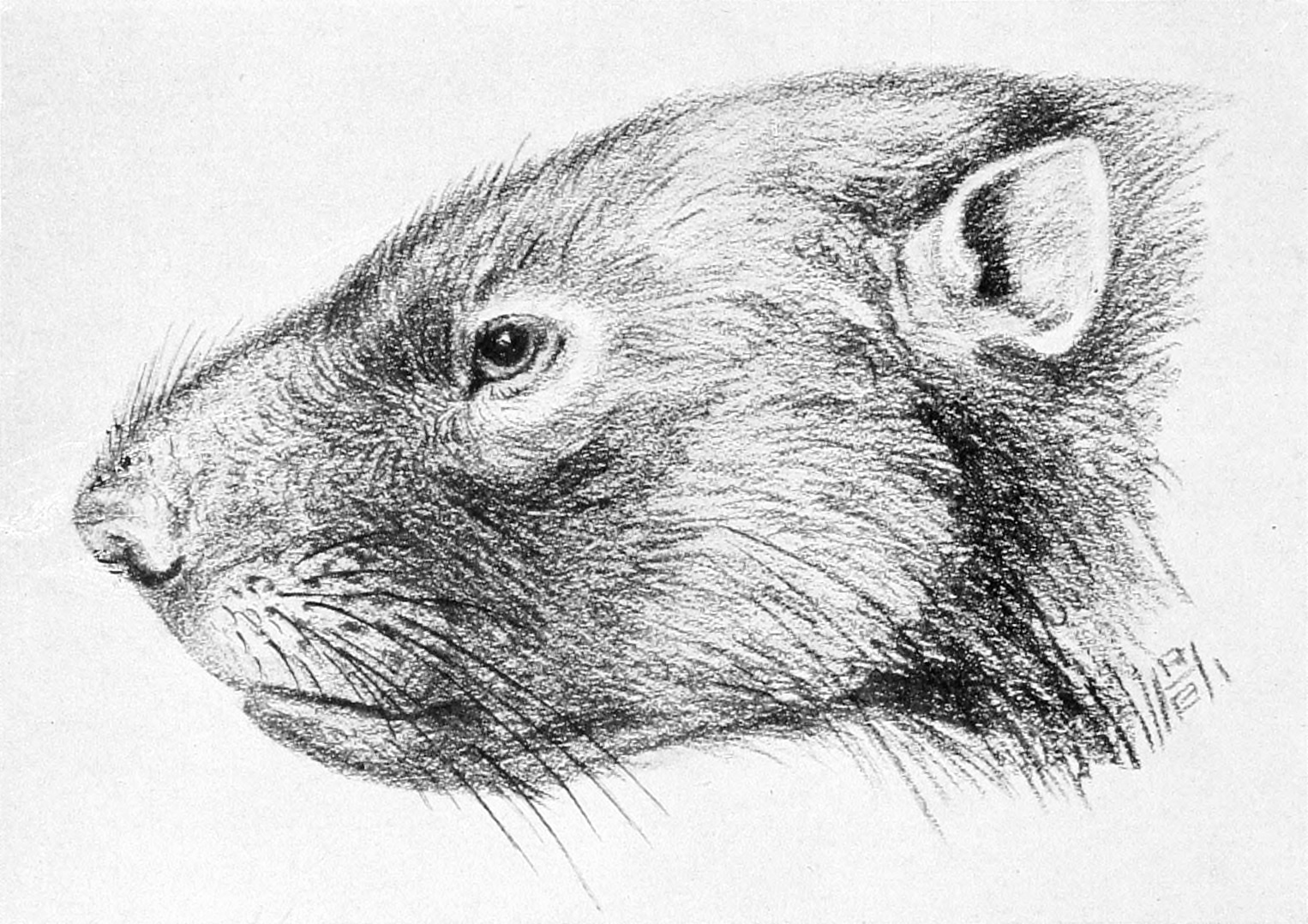
Taeniolabis, a large taeniolabid multituberculate

Wortmania, a taeniodont

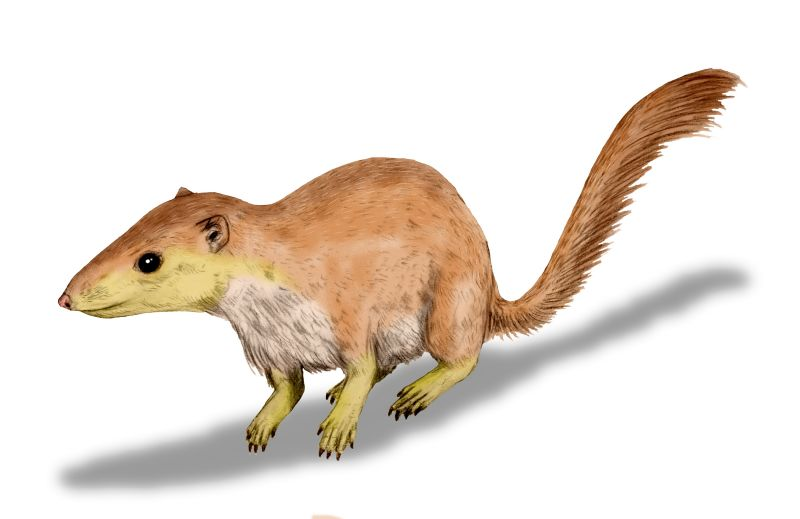
Purgatorius, a possible primate relative

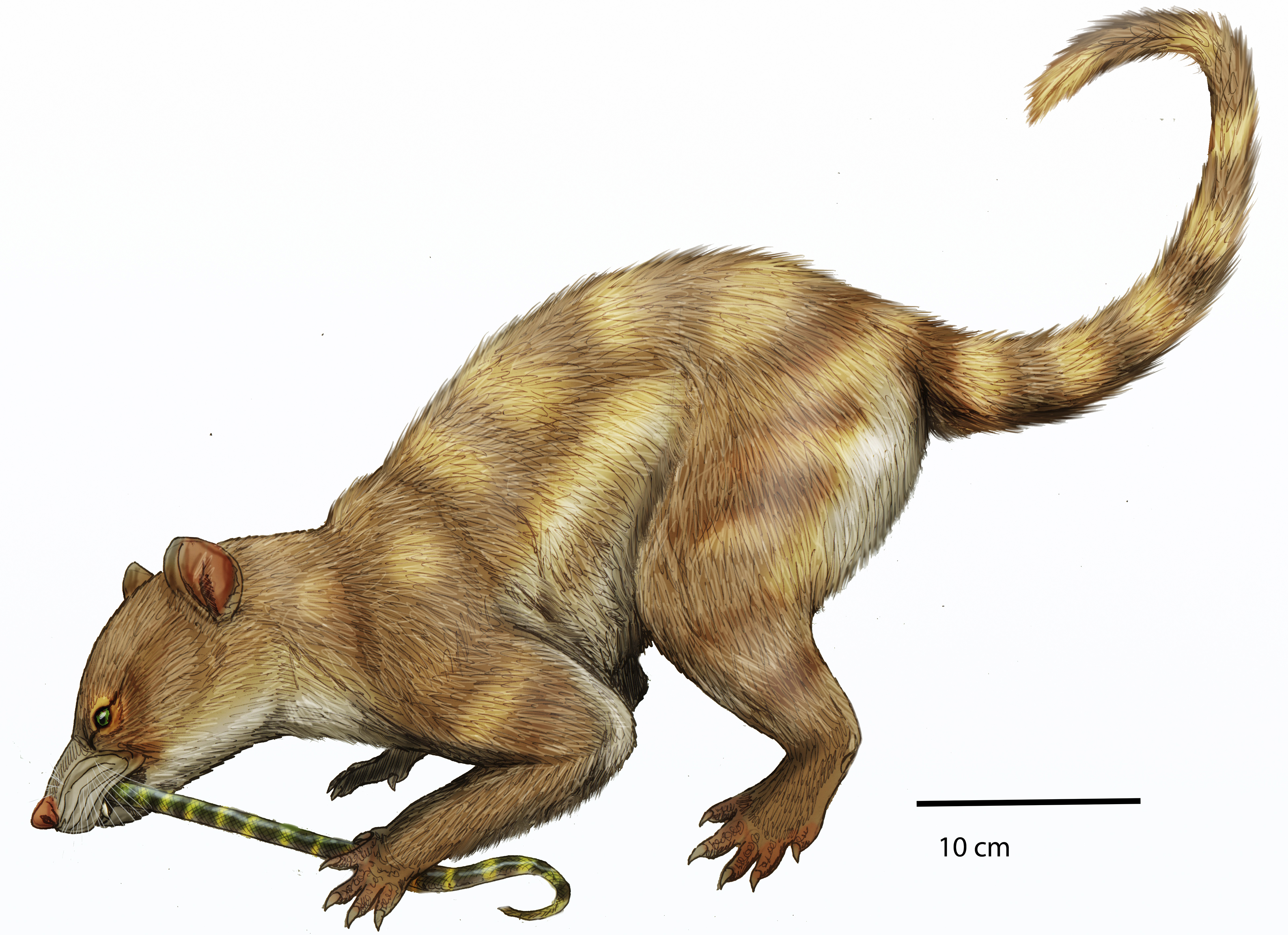
Chriacus, an arctocyonid

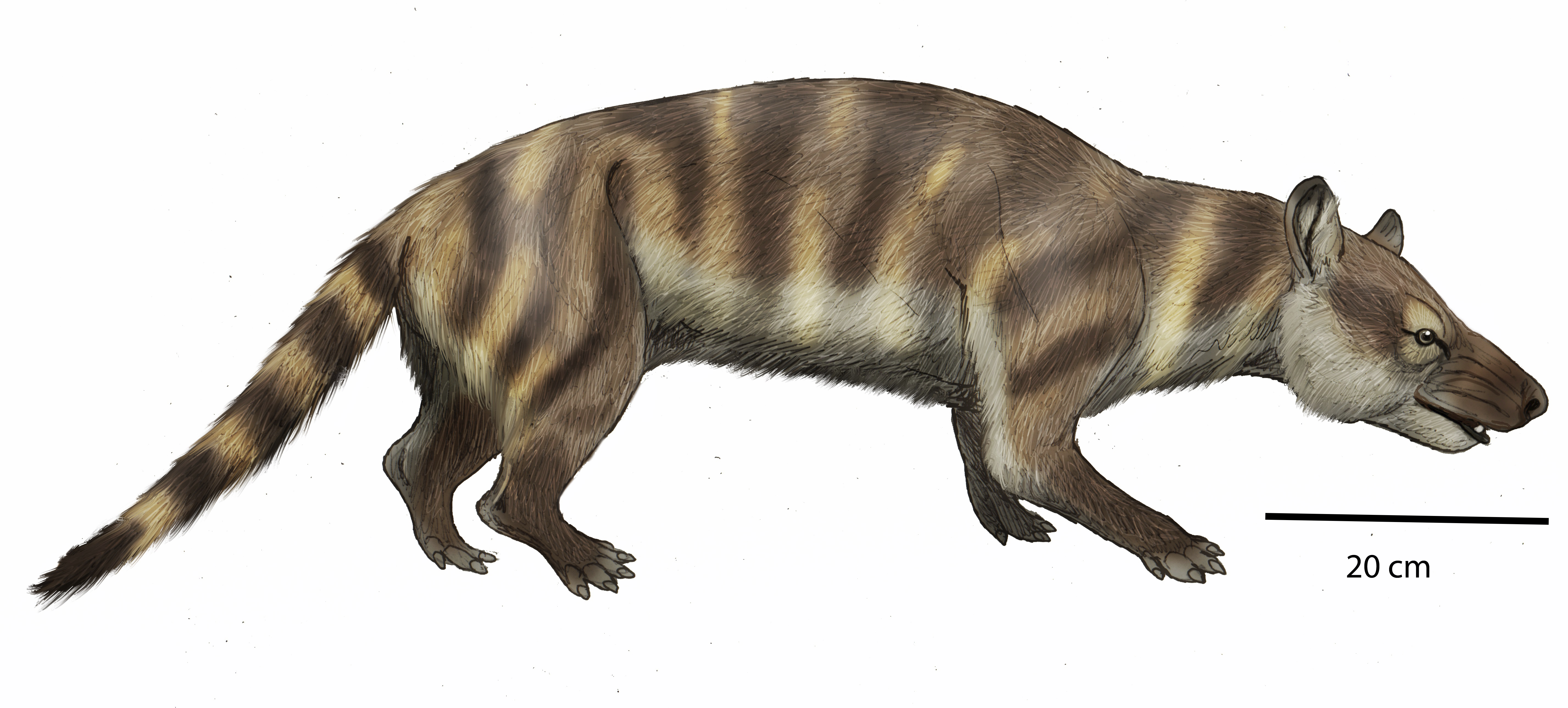
Carsioptychus, a periptychid

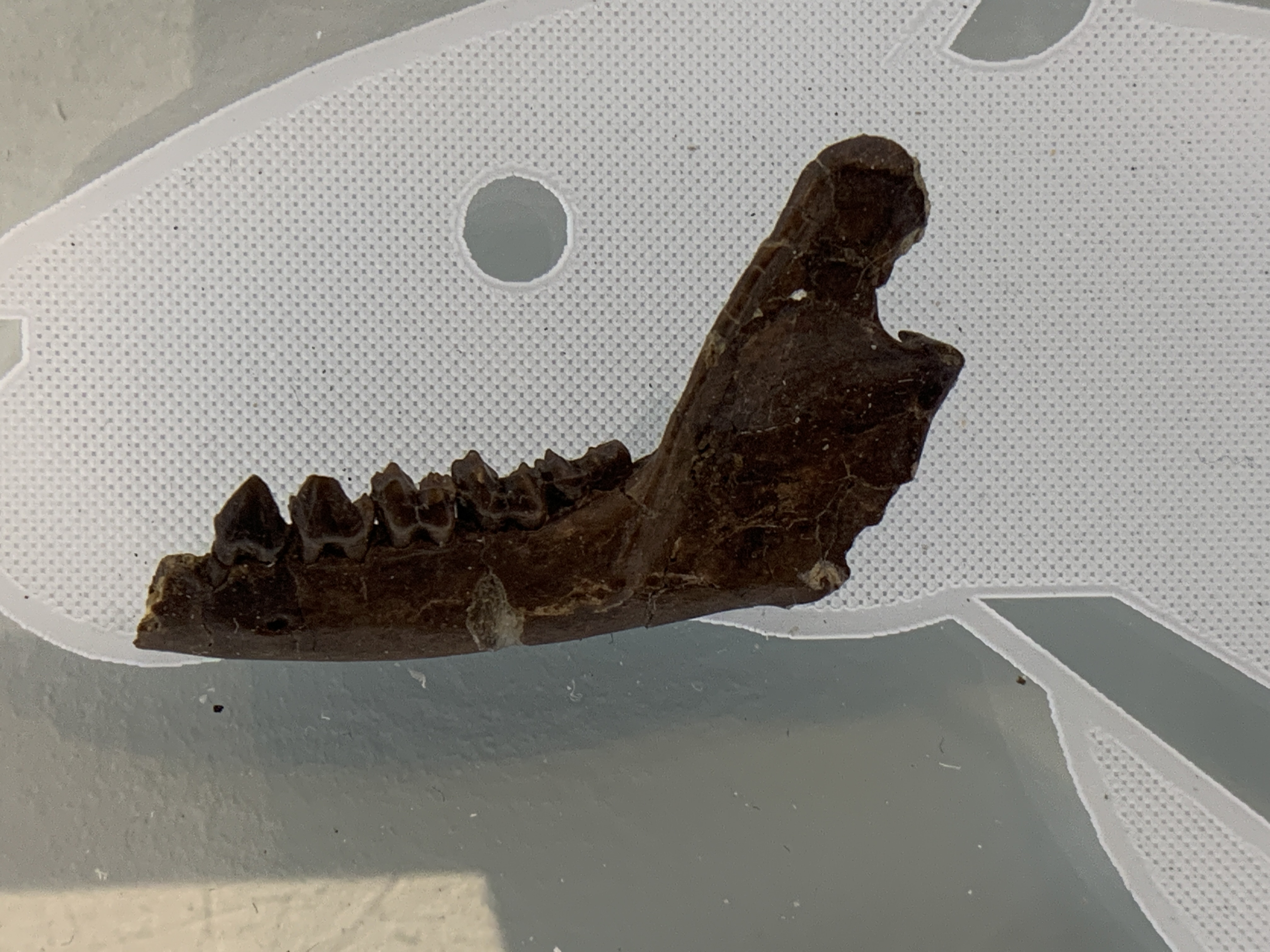
Promioclaenus, a mioclaenid

== Substages ==
The Puercan is considered to contain the following substages:

- Puercan 1 (Pu1): The oldest substage, starting at the first appearance of the "condylarth" Protungulatum donnae and ending at the first appearance of the periptychid Ectoconus. The marsupial-like mammal Peradectes was sometimes used to characterize the start of Puercan 1, in cases where Protungulatum was regarded as a Cretaceous mammal. The earliest Peradectes fossils are now classified as Thylacodon.
  - Some authors have proposed alternate names for the lowermost part of the Puercan, which may show a transition from Cretaceous to Paleocene faunas: "Mantuan" (named after Mantua Lentil site of Wyoming), "Bugcreekian" (named after the Bug Creek area of Montana), or "Puercan 0". None of these names found widespread adoption.
- Puercan 2 (Pu2): The second substage, starting at the first appearance of Ectoconus and ending at the first appearance of the multituberculate Taeniolabis taoensis.
- Puercan 3 (Pu3): The youngest substage, starting at the first appearance of Taeniolabis taoensis and ending at the first appearance of the periptychid Periptychus carinidens, which marks the start of the succeeding Torrejonian NALMA. Kimbetopsalis simmonsae, a multituberculate from Pu2 layers in Colorado, may actually be a species of Taeniolabis, which would extend the range of Taeniolabis down to Pu2.

== Fossil localities ==
The Puercan is named after the "Puerco marls" or "Puerco Formation", historical terms for the lower part of the Nacimiento Formation in San Juan Basin, New Mexico. Some examples of strata preserving Puercan-age fossils include:

- Alberta:
  - Willow Creek Formation (Pu2 Sheep Ahoy! fauna)
- Colorado:
  - Denver Formation (Pu1 Littleton local fauna, Pu2–Pu3 Corral Bluffs)
- North Dakota:
  - Ludlow Formation (Pu2–Pu3 Pita Flats)
- New Mexico:
  - Nacimiento Formation (Pu2–Pu3 Arroyo Chijuillita Member)
- Montana:
  - Crazy Mountains Basin: Bear Formation (Pu2–Pu3 Simpson Quarry)
  - Williston Basin:
    - Hell Creek Formation (Pu1 Bug Creek Anthills, Harbicht Hill)
    - Fort Union Formation Tullock Member (Pu3 Purgatory Hill, Garbani Channel)
    - Fort Union Formation Ludlow Member (Pu2 Hiatt local fauna)
- Saskatchewan:
  - Ravenscrag Formation (Pu1 Frenchman, Long Fall, Pu3 Croc Pot)
- Utah:
  - North Horn Formation (Pu2 Gas Tank Hill local fauna, Pu3 Wagonroad)
- Wyoming:
  - Bighorn Basin: Fort Union Formation (Pu1 Mantua Lentil local fauna, Pu1 Leidy Quarry)
  - Great Divide Basin: Fort Union Formation (Pu1 China Butte Member)
  - Hanna Basin: Ferris Formation (Pu1–Pu3)
