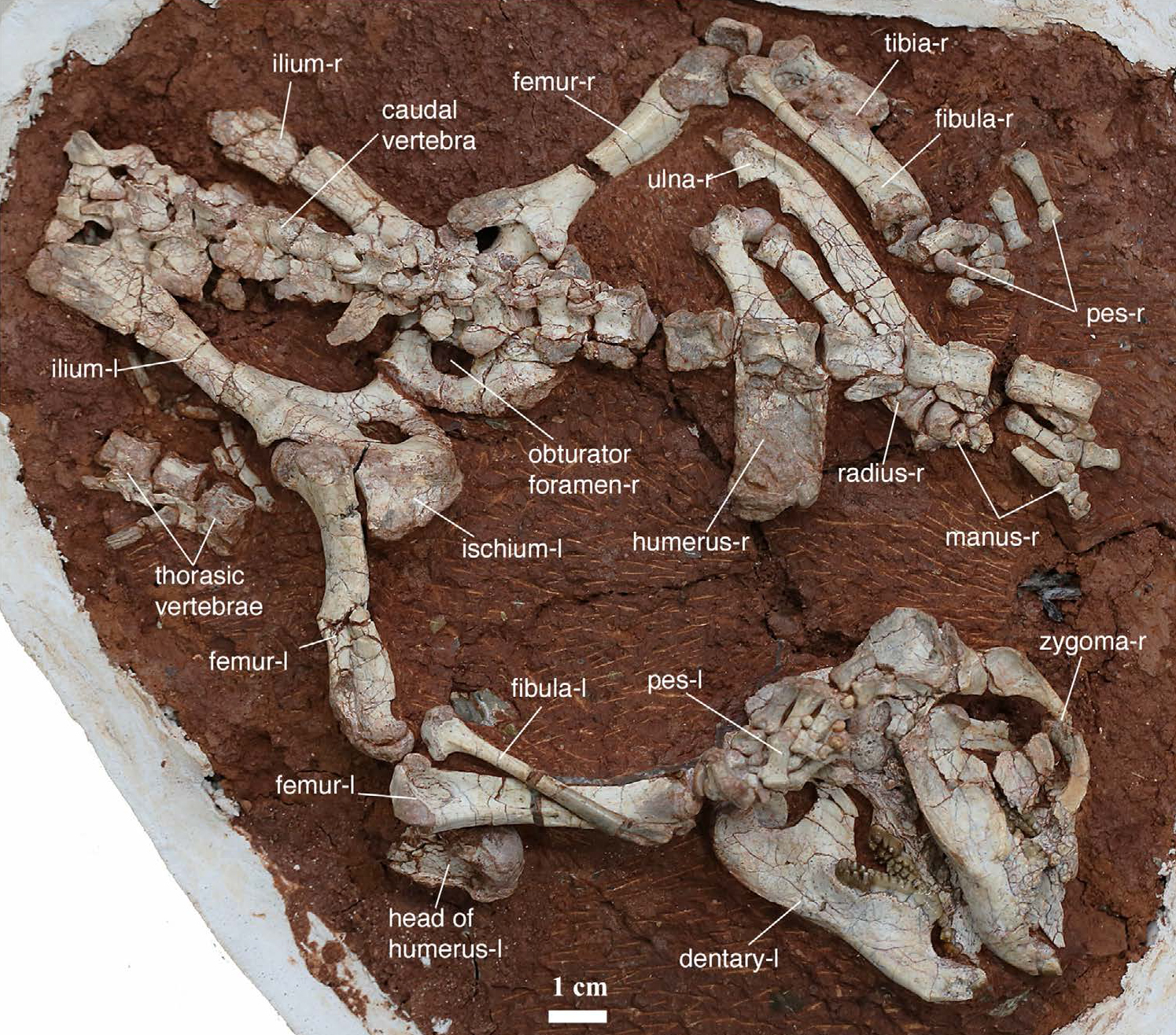
- Holotype fossil; the skull and forelimbs are displaced in relation to the rest of the skeleton

Scientific classification
- Kingdom: Animalia
- Phylum: Chordata
- Class: Mammalia
- Order: †Multituberculata
- Superfamily: †Taeniolabidoidea
- Genus: †Yubaatar; Xu et al., 2015

Species
- Y. qianzhouensis Hu & Han, 2021; Y. zhongyuanensis Xu et al., 2015

= Yubaatar =

Yubaatar Temporal range: Late Cretaceous

Extinct genus of mammals

Yubaatar is a genus of multituberculate, an extinct order of rodent-like mammals, which lived in what is now China during the Late Cretaceous. The first specimen was discovered in the Qiupa Formation of Luanchuan County, in the Henan. The specimen consists of a partial skeleton with a nearly complete skull, and was made the holotype of the new genus and species Yubaartar zhongyuanensis by the Chinese palaeontologist Li Xu and colleagues in 2015. The generic name consists of the word Yu, which is the pinyin spelling of the Chinese character for the Henan Province, and the Mongolian word baatar, which means "hero", a word commonly used as suffix in the names of Asian multituberculates. The specific name comes from Zhongyuan, an ancient name for the geographic area of the province.

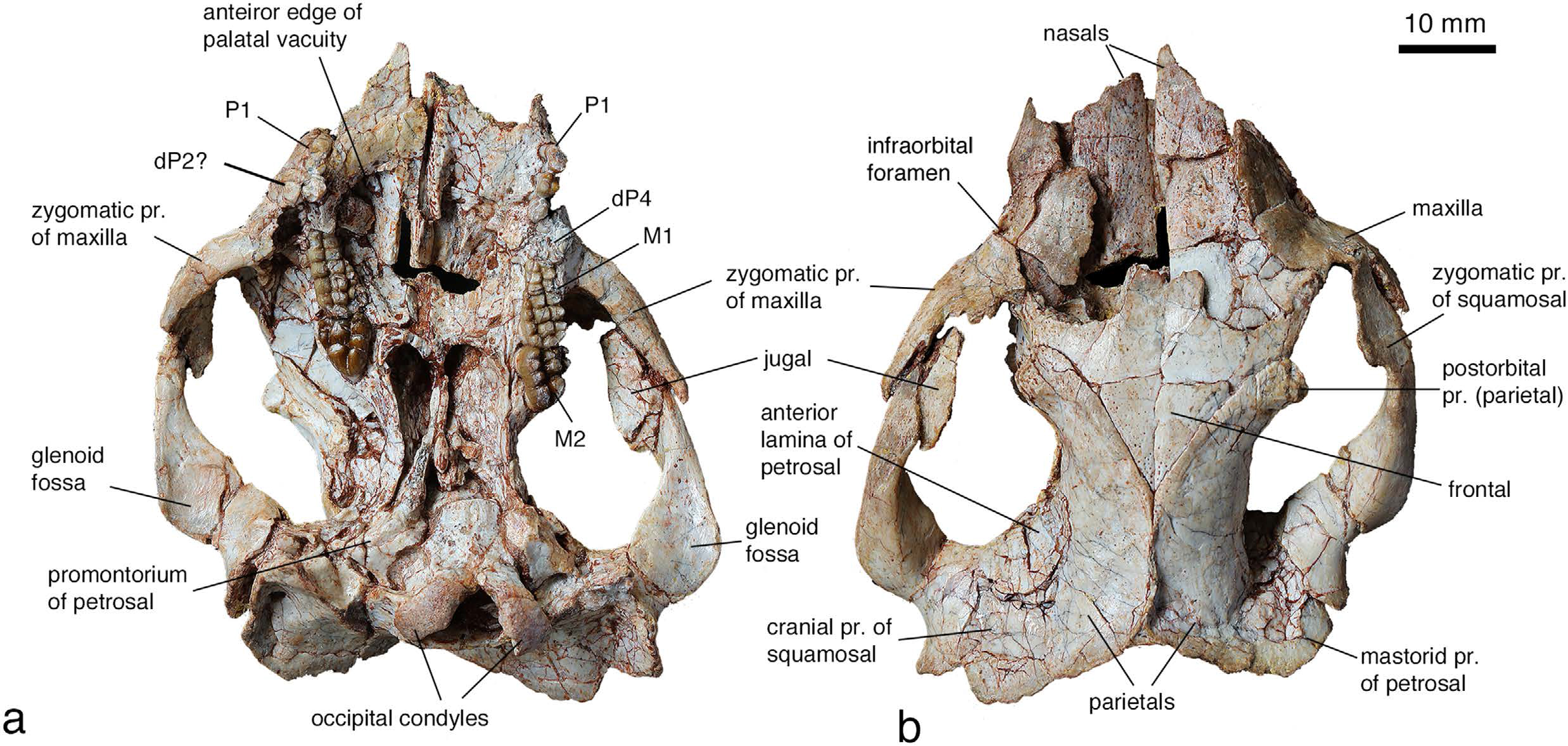
Holotype skull shown from below and above; it is partially distorted

Yubaatar is the first known and southernmost Late Cretaceous multituberculate outside the Mongolian plateau (most multituberculate specimens mainly consist only of teeth and jaws, and are rarely found in eastern Asia). With a skull 7 cm long, Yubaatar was one of the largest members of the group known from the Mesozoic, only exceeded in size by Erythrobaatar and Bubodens. Yubaatar had a unique feature among multituberculates in that its last upper premolar was replaced. The holotype specimen had a palaeopathology unique among known Mesozoic mammal, a severely broken right tibia bone, which was probably damaged in an accident, but had healed.

Yubaatar was found to be basal to the clade Taeniolabidoidea, which consists of North American and Asian multituberculates; this indicates there was a faunal interchange between Asia and North America before the Cretaceous–Paleogene transition. The morphology of Yubaatar indicates that diversity in the complexity of the teeth of multituberculates, relating to their diets, increased with the number of genera and difference in body size, and that there was a shift in adaptations towards increased herbivory in the group across the Cretaceous–Paleogene boundary.

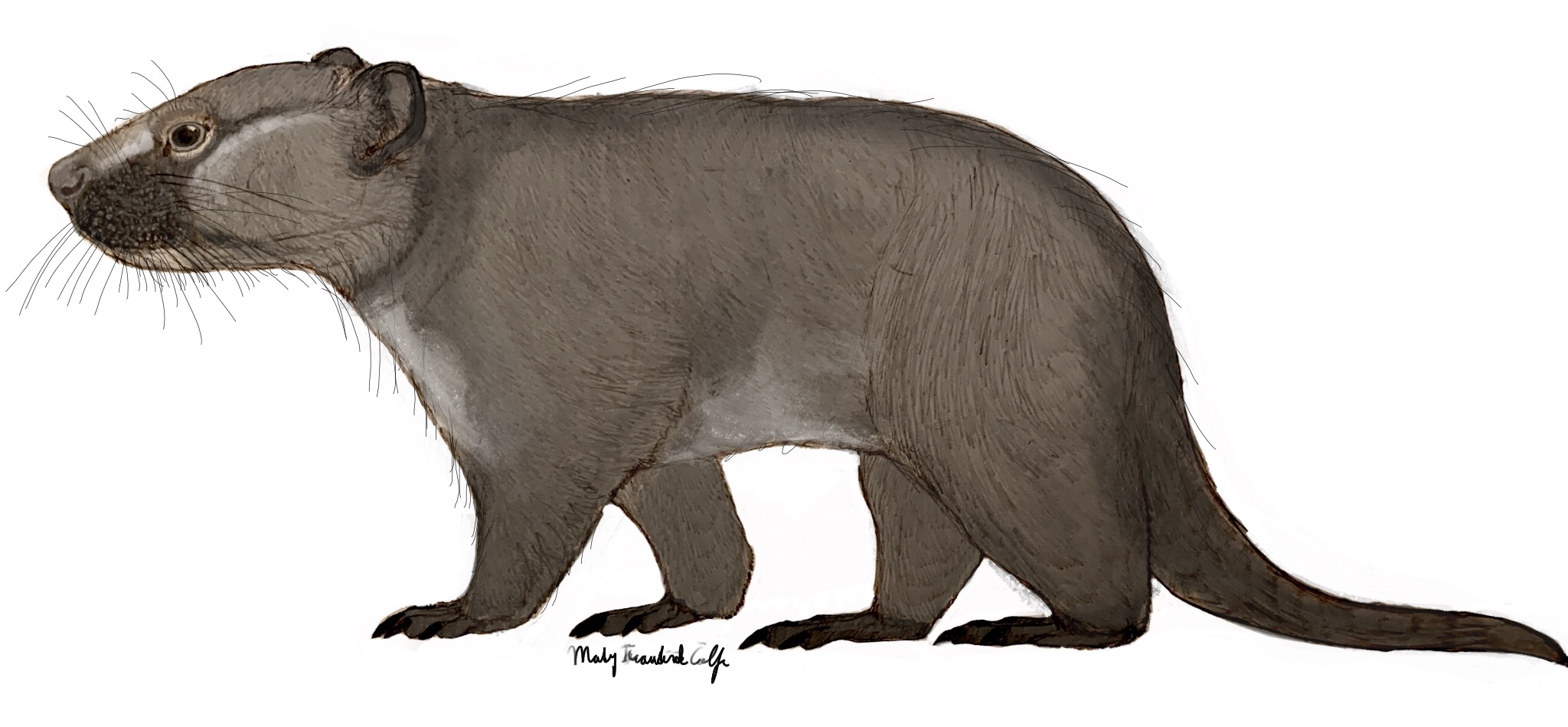
Life restoration.
