= Beornus =

Beornus Temporal range: Danian

Scientific classification
- Kingdom: Animalia
- Phylum: Chordata
- Class: Mammalia
- Family: †Periptychidae
- Genus: †Beornus
- Species: †B. honeyi

Binomial name
- †Beornus honeyi Atteberry & Eberle, 2021

Extinct genus of mammals

Beornus is an extinct genus of periptychid that lived in North America during the Danian stage of the Palaeocene epoch.

== Distribution ==
Beornus honeyi is known from Puercan layers of the Fort Union Formation of Wyoming.
