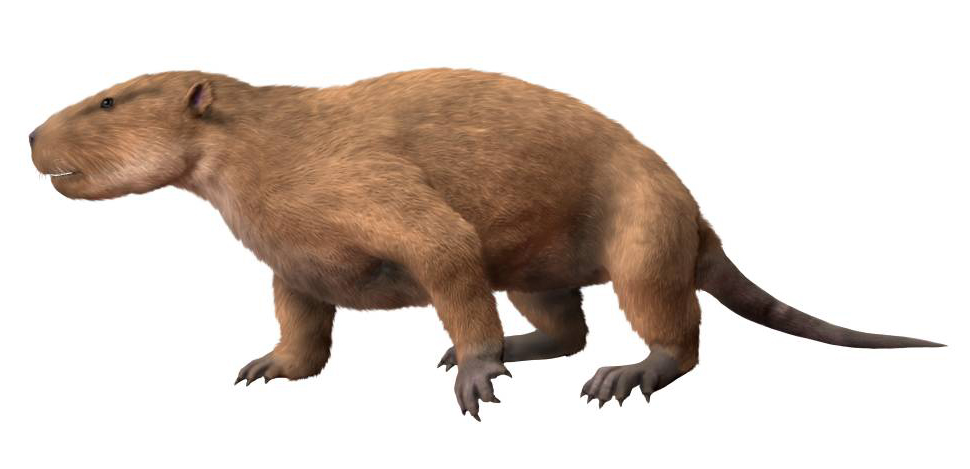
- Taeniolabis taoensis life reconstruction.

Scientific classification
- Kingdom: Animalia
- Phylum: Chordata
- Class: Mammalia
- Order: †Multituberculata
- Suborder: †Cimolodonta
- Superfamily: †Taeniolabidoidea; Sloan and van Valen, 1965

Families and genera
- Valenopsalis; Catopsalis paraphyletic; ?Bubodens; Erythrobaatar; Yubaatar; Taeniolabididae; Taeniolabis; Kimbetopsalis; Melesonyx; Lambdopsalidae; Lambdopsalis; Sphenopsalis; Prionessus

= Taeniolabidoidea =

Taeniolabidoidea Temporal range: 66–56 Ma Late Cretaceous-Paleocene

Extinct superfamily of mammals

Taeniolabidoidea is a group of extinct mammals known whose fossils can be found in North America and Asia. They were the largest members of the extinct order Multituberculata, as well as the largest non-therian mammals. Lambdopsalis even provides direct fossil evidence of mammalian fur in a fairly good state of preservation for a 60-million-year-old animal. Some of these animals were large for their time; Taeniolabis taoensis is the largest known multituberculate and though smaller, Yubaatar is the largest known Mesozoic Asian multituberculate. T. taoensis averaged a body mass of 22.7 kilograms (50 lb).

The group was initially established as a suborder, before being assigned the rank of a superfamily by McKenna and Bell in 1997. Two families are recognised: the primarily North American Taeniolabididae, composed of Taeniolabis and Kimbetopsalis, and the exclusively Asian Lambdopsalidae, composed of Lambdopsalis, Sphenopsalis and Prionessus, with Valenopsalis being a basal form outside of either clade. Some of the fossils are well-preserved. Though the possible taeniolabidoid Bubodens is known from the Lancian Late Cretaceous deposits of South Dakota, and Yubaatar is known from Late Cretaceous deposits in the Henan Province, the clade is otherwise only clearly represented in Paleocene strata.

Members of this group have dental formulas of 2.0.1.21.0.1.2 or 2.0.2.21.0.1.2. Russell notes that the taeniolabidoids had ever-growing, self-sharpening incisors, much like modern rodents, and the premolars that are usually characteristic of multituberculates are sometimes lost in this family. Derived characteristics of the taxon (apomorphies) include: "snout short and wide with anterior part of zygomatic arches directed transversely, resulting in a square-like shape of the skull (shared with Kogaionidae); frontals small, pointed posteriorly, almost or completely excluded from the orbital rim".
