= Prionessus =

Prionessus Temporal range: Thanetian ~59–55 Ma

Scientific classification
- Kingdom: Animalia
- Phylum: Chordata
- Class: Mammalia
- Order: †Multituberculata
- Family: †Lambdopsalidae
- Genus: †Prionessus
- Species: †P. lucifer

Binomial name
- †Prionessus lucifer Matthew and Granger, 1925

Extinct genus of mammals

Prionessus is a genus of extinct mammal from the Paleocene of what is now Central Asia. It was a member of the extinct order Multituberculata within the suborder Cimolodonta and superfamily Taeniolabidoidea. The genus was named by William Diller Matthew and Walter Granger in 1925, and is based on a single species P.lucifer.

Kielan-Jarowoska and Hurum believe that members of the Taeniolabidoidea, such as Prionessus, are all quite similar. For example, they all share a short wide snout and a blocky head so it is probably instructive to look at a close and more commonly occurring relative, Lambdopsalis bulla, a likely burrower. Matthew and Granger noted in their discovery that P.lucifer had a robust lower incisor, supportive of this similarity.

Fossil remains have been found in the Late Paleocene Nomogen and Khashat Formations of Gashato, Naran and Nomogen in Bayan Ulan of Mongolia and China. Prionessus fossils range from 59-55 million years ago, through the Thanetian age of the late Paleocene. They were estimated to have had a body mass of about 370 grams (13 oz).
