= S. nobilis =

S. nobilis may refer to:

- Sphenopsalis nobilis, an extinct mammal species from the Paleocene of Central Asia
- Steatoda nobilis, the biting spider or false black widow, a spider species

== Synonyms ==
- Stapelia nobilis, a synonym for Stapelia gigantea, a plant species

== See also ==
- Nobilis (disambiguation)
