= Medicine Bow Formation =

Geological formation in Wyoming, United States

- Stratigraphic range: Late Cretaceous
- Type: Geological formation
- Underlies: Ferris Formation

Location
- Region: North America

The Medicine Bow Formation is a geological formation in Wyoming, United States, whose strata date back to the Late Cretaceous. Dinosaur remains are among the fossils that have been recovered from the formation.

== See also ==
- List of dinosaur-bearing rock formations
