= Militocodon =

Militocodon Temporal range: Danian

Scientific classification
- Kingdom: Animalia
- Phylum: Chordata
- Class: Mammalia
- Infraclass: Placentalia
- Family: †Periptychidae
- Genus: †Militocodon
- Species: †M. lydae

Binomial name
- †Militocodon lydae Weaver et al., 2024

Extinct genus of mammals

Militocodon is an extinct genus of periptychid that lived in Colorado during the Danian stage of the Palaeocene epoch. It is a monotypic genus that contains the species M. lydae.
