= Anisonchanus =

Anisonchanus Temporal range: Paleocene

Scientific classification
- Domain: Eukaryota
- Kingdom: Animalia
- Phylum: Chordata
- Class: Mammalia
- Family: †Periptychidae
- Subfamily: †Anisonchinae
- Genus: †Anisonchanus; Strand, 1928

Type species
- †Anisonchanus sectorius (Cope, 1881a)

Synonyms
- Genus synonymy: Anisonchus Cope, 1881b (preoccupied by Anisonchus Dejean, 1833); Species synonymy: Mioclaenus sectorius Cope, 1881a; Anisonchus sectorius (Cope, 1881a)

Extinct genus of mammals

Anisonchanus is an extinct genus of mammals that lived in North America during the Paleocene.

== Taxonomy ==
In 1881, Edward Drinker Cope named the species Mioclaenus sectorius for jaws with teeth from the Puerco Formation of New Mexico. He reassigned it to the new genus Anisonchus later the same year. That name was preoccupied by the beetle Anisonchus, which was erected by Pierre F.M.A. Dejean in 1833. (Note: The publication date is based on Bousquet & Bouchard (2013).) In 1928, Embrik Strand proposed Anisonchanus as a replacement.
