= Sphenopsalis =

Sphenopsalis Temporal range: Thanetian ~59–55 Ma

Scientific classification
- Kingdom: Animalia
- Phylum: Chordata
- Class: Mammalia
- Order: †Multituberculata
- Family: †Lambdopsalidae
- Genus: †Sphenopsalis
- Species: †S. nobilis

Binomial name
- †Sphenopsalis nobilis Matthew, Granger & Simpson, 1928

Extinct genus of mammals

Sphenopsalis is a genus of extinct mammal from the Paleocene of what is now Central Asia. It was a member of the extinct order Multituberculata, and lies within the suborder Cimolodonta and the superfamily Taeniolabidoidea. The genus was named by William Diller Matthew, W. Granger and George Gaylord Simpson in 1928.

Many workers believe that members of the Taeniolabidoidea, such as Sphenopsalis, are all quite similar. For example, they all share a short wide snout and a blocky head so it is probably instructive to look at a close and more commonly occurring relative, Lambdopsalis bulla, a likely burrower.

This organism is found in the fossil record from 59-55 million years ago, during the Thanetian age. One distinguishing feature of this genus is a single rooted 4th premolar (P4). Based on the structure of their teeth, Sphenopsalis appears to have been a leaf eater (foliovore). They and/or their close relatives may have been partially adapted to a digging (fossorial) lifestyle.

The one known species, Sphenopsalis nobilis, was also named by Matthew, Granger and Simpson in 1928. It has been found in the Late Paleocene Nomogen and Khashat Formation of Mongolia and China. For many years, this species was only known from a handful of fragmentary teeth and bones, but Mao et al discovered additional specimens in 2016 that allowed for more detailed analysis. The American Museum of Natural History in New York City has several fragmentary specimens in its collection.
