= Kimbetopsalis =

Kimbetopsalis Temporal range: - Middle Puercan, 65 Ma

Scientific classification
- Kingdom: Animalia
- Phylum: Chordata
- Class: Mammalia
- Order: †Multituberculata
- Family: †Taeniolabididae
- Genus: †Kimbetopsalis; Williamson et al., 2016
- Species: †K. simmonsae

Binomial name
- †Kimbetopsalis simmonsae Williamson et al., 2016

Extinct genus of mammals

Kimbetopsalis simmonsae is an extinct species of multituberculate (an extinct mammal group) from the Paleocene (Puercan 2) of Colorado. It lived about 65.5 million years ago, at least a million years after the non-avian dinosaurs went extinct. Kimbetopsalis was first described in 2015. A 2026 study regarded Kimbetopsalis simmonsae as a species of Taeniolabis.
