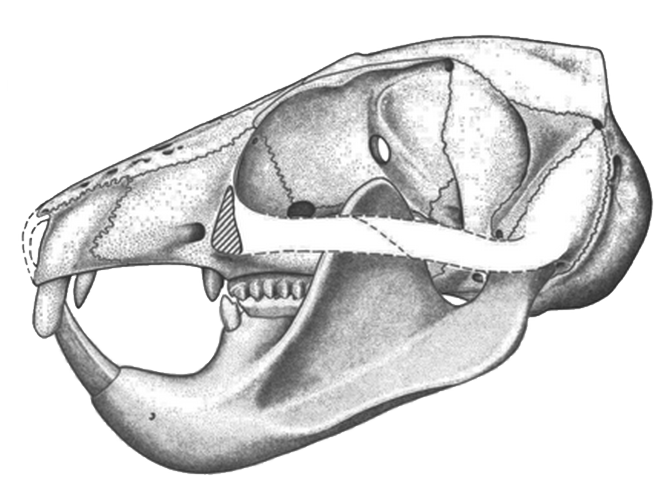
- Lambdopsalis bulla - skull

Scientific classification
- Kingdom: Animalia
- Phylum: Chordata
- Class: Mammalia
- Order: †Multituberculata
- Superfamily: †Taeniolabidoidea
- Family: †Lambdopsalidae; Chow and Qi, 1978

Genera
- †Lambdopsalis; †Sphenopsalis; †Prionessus

= Lambdopsalidae =

Lambdopsalidae Temporal range: 59–55 Ma Thanetian/Late Paleocene

Extinct family of mammals

Lambdopsalidae is a family of extinct multituberculate mammals from the Late Paleocene of Asia. They are part of Taeniolabidoidea, a clade otherwise present in the Early Paleocene (and possibly the Late Cretaceous) of North America. The Lambdopsalids probably evolved from a single radiation that spread into Asia from North America in the mid-Paleocene or earlier. They are represented by the genera Lambdopsalis, Sphenopsalis and Prionessus. This group was first defined in 1978 by Chow and Tao Qi.

The Lambdopsalids were small mammals, with estimated adult body masses of about 0.4 kilograms (0.88 lb) to 0.8 kilograms (1.8 lb). They are notable for their enlarged teeth that implies adaptations towards leaf grazing, and adaptations for burrowing such as a short and flat snout, robust humeri, stiff neck and enlarged lower incisors. This group has a shared dental formula of 2.0.1.21.0.1.2 Examples of Lambdopsalis are notable for offering direct evidence of hair and enamel and tooth prism patterns among multituberculates.

Lambdopsalids lived during the Thanetian, the last stage of the Paleocene, with fossils ranging from 59-55 million years ago. They disappeared around the PETM.
