= Valenopsalis =

Valenopsalis Temporal range: - Middle Puercan, 65 Ma

Scientific classification
- Kingdom: Animalia
- Phylum: Chordata
- Class: Mammalia
- Order: †Multituberculata
- Superfamily: †Taeniolabidoidea
- Genus: †Valenopsalis; Williamson, 2015
- Species: †V. joyneri

Binomial name
- †Valenopsalis joyneri Sloan and Van Valen, 1965

Extinct genus of mammals

Valenopsalis is an extinct mammal from the Paleocene of North America (more specifically, Puercan-aged deposits in Wyoming, Montana and Saskatchewan. Originally referred to the genus Catopsalis (C. joyneri), it has more recently been moved to its own genus as the former was understood to be a wastebasket taxon. It is currently considered to be the most basal representative of Taeniolabidoidea.
