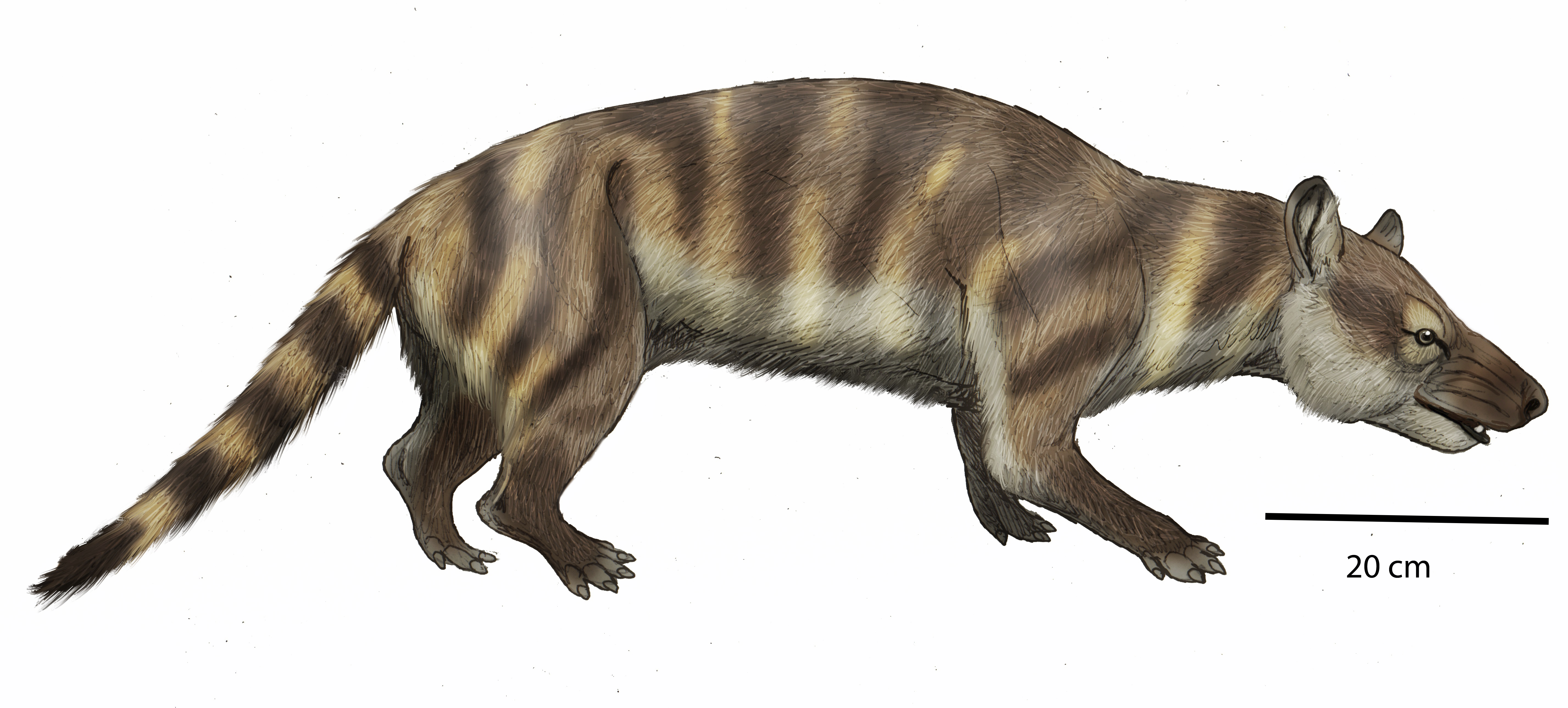
- Life restoration of C. coarctatus

Scientific classification
- Kingdom: Animalia
- Phylum: Chordata
- Class: Mammalia
- Family: †Periptychidae
- Subfamily: †Periptychinae
- Genus: †Carsioptychus; Simpson, 1936

Type species
- †Periptychus coarctatus Cope, 1883

Species
- C. coarctatus (Cope, 1883)

Synonyms
- C. hamaxitus Gazin, 1941; C. matthewi (Simpson, 1936); Periptychus brabensis Cope, 1888

= Carsioptychus =

Carsioptychus Temporal range: Early Paleocene (Puercan)

Extinct genus of mammals

Carsioptychus is an extinct genus of periptychid mammal from the early Paleocene (Puercan) of North America. The skull anatomy of Carsioptychus suggests that it had a relatively small brain among mammals, with large olfactory bulbs (indicating a good sense of smell), a standard hearing range, and low agility similar to modern pigs. It would have had a strong bite and thick bunodont teeth useful for processing tough plant material such as nuts, tubers, and leaves.

== Taxonomy ==
The type species, Carsioptychus coarctatus, was originally named as a species of Periptychus. Simpson (1935) later gave it the new genus Plagioptychus, which he quickly amended to Carsioptychus (as Plagioptychus was preoccupied by a rudist bivalve). Subsequent studies disagreed over whether Carsioptychus is a junior synonym of Periptychus or a valid genus, while recent overviews regard it as valid.

C. coarctatus was first discovered in the Nacimiento Formation of New Mexico. Several other early periptychids (C. matthewi and Periptychus brabensis from the Nacimiento Formation, C. hamaxitus from the early Torrejonian North Horn Formation of Utah) are probably synonymous with C. coarctatus. Carsioptychus is also known from Corral Bluffs, a site from the Denver Formation of Colorado.
