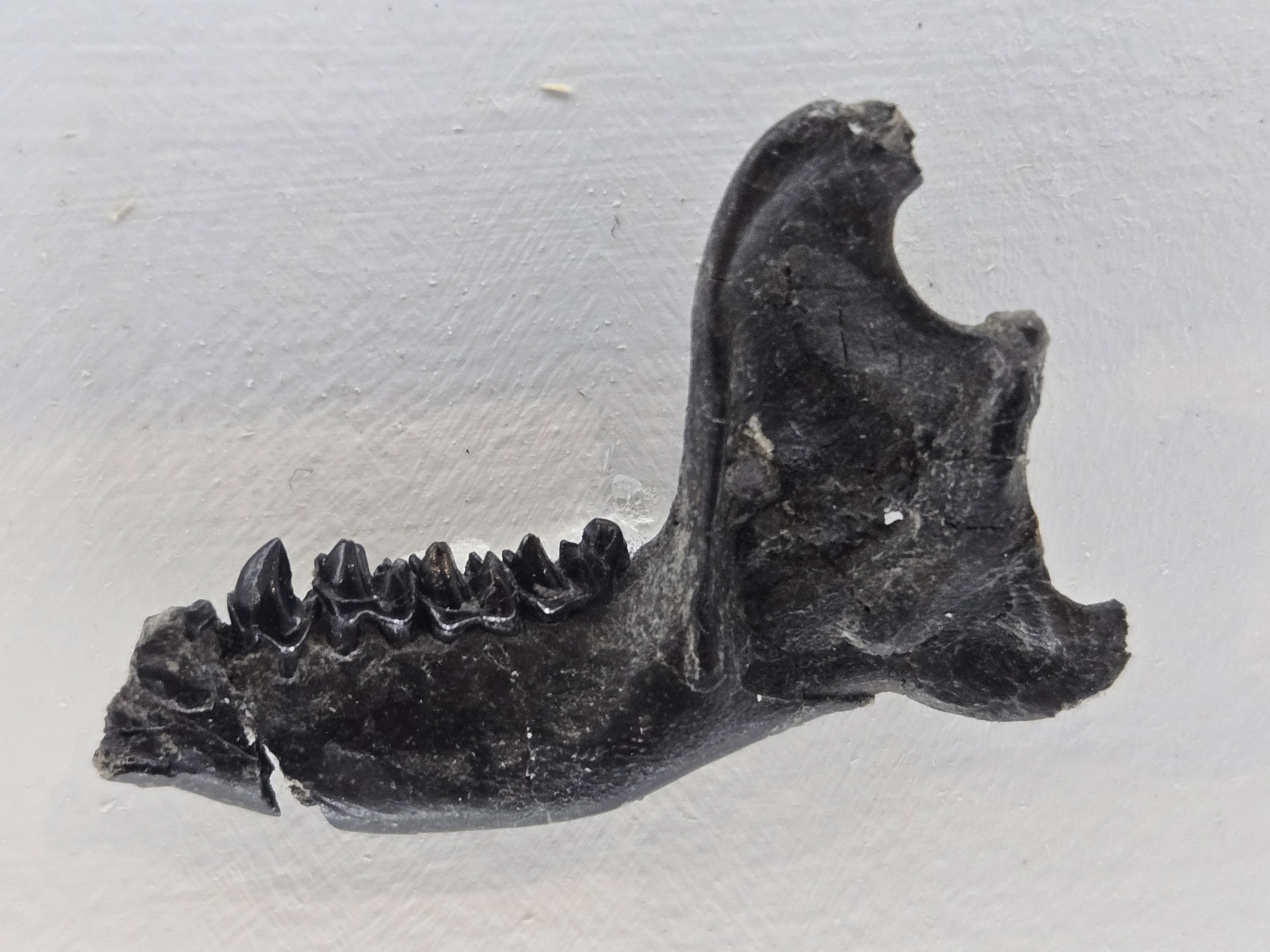
- A partial jaw from the Willow Creek Formation of Alberta

Scientific classification
- Kingdom: Animalia
- Phylum: Chordata
- Class: Mammalia
- Family: †Periptychidae
- Subfamily: †Conacodontinae
- Genus: †Oxyacodon; Osborn and Earle, 1895

Species
- O. agapetillus (Cope, 1884); O. apiculatus (type) Osborn and Earle, 1895; O. ferronensis Archibald et al., 1983; O. marshater Van Valen, 1978; O. priscilla Matthew, 1937

= Oxyacodon =

Oxyacodon Temporal range: 66–63 Ma Early Paleocene

Extinct genus of mammals

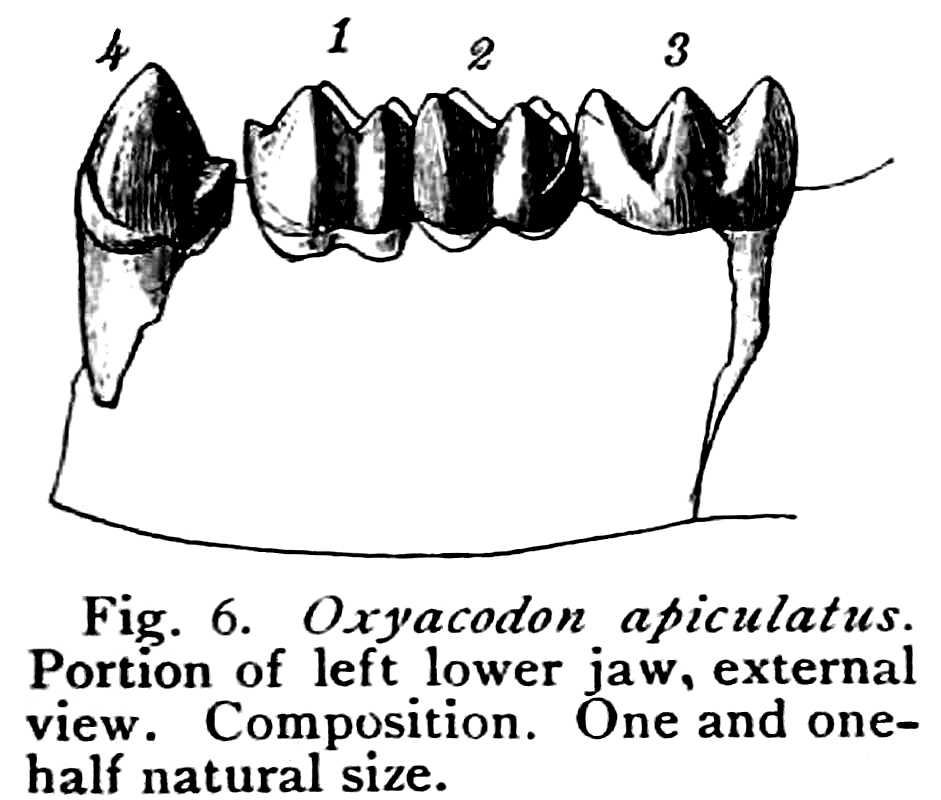

Oxyacodon is an extinct genus of condylarth of the family Periptychidae endemic to North America during the Early Paleocene living from 66 to 63.3 mya, existing for approximately 2.7 million years.

== Taxonomy ==
Oxyacodon was named by Osborn and Earle (1895). Its type is Oxyacodon apiculatus. It was assigned to Periptychidae by Osborn and Earle (1895) and Carroll (1988); and to Conacodontinae by Archibald (1998), Eberle (2003) and Middleton and Dewar (2004).

Fossils have been found dating back to the Puercan stage in New Mexico, Colorado, Utah, Wyoming, Montana, North Dakota and Saskatchewan.
