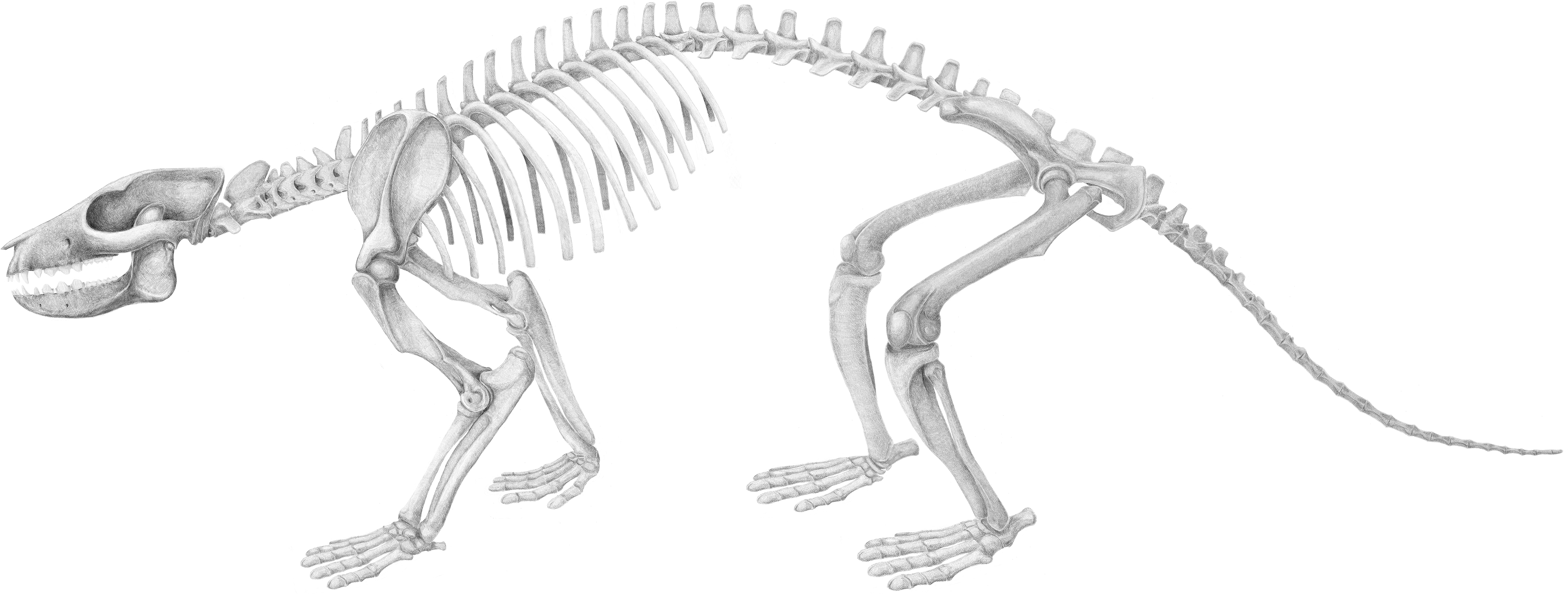
- Skeletal reconstruction of P. carinidens

Scientific classification
- Kingdom: Animalia
- Phylum: Chordata
- Class: Mammalia
- Infraclass: Placentalia
- Family: †Periptychidae
- Subfamily: †Periptychinae
- Genus: †Periptychus; Cope, 1881

Type species
- †Periptychus carinidens Cope, 1881

Species
- P. carinidens Cope, 1881

= Periptychus =

Periptychus Temporal range: Early Paleocene-Late Paleocene (Torrejonian-Tiffanian) ~63.3–61.7 Ma

Extinct genus of mammals

Periptychus is an extinct genus of mammal belonging to the family Periptychidae. It lived from the Early to Late Paleocene and its fossil remains have been found in North America.

== Description ==
This animal was of medium size and could exceed one meter in overall length; Periptychus is supposed to have weighed about 23 kilograms. Periptychus was an unusual mammal that combined a number of rather specialized dental, cranial, and postcranial features with a relatively generalized skeletal structure.

=== Skull ===
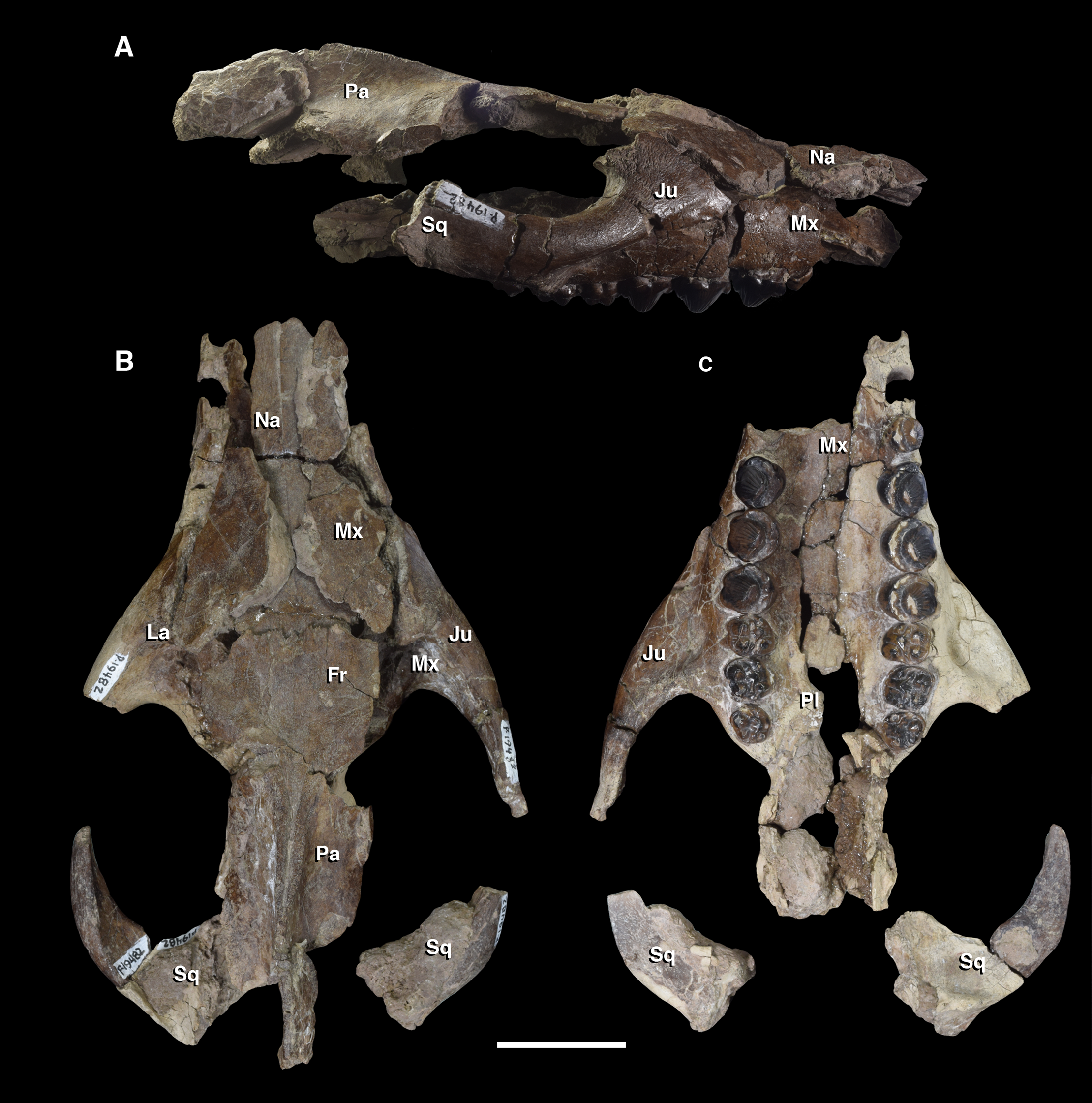
Skull of P. carinidens

The shape of the skull of Periptychus was almost identical to that of early Eutheria, although it was more robust. The snout of Periptychus was moderately elongated and tall, and tapered anteriorly without a rostral constriction. The morphology of the rostrum of this animal was very similar to that found in related genera such as Carsioptychus or Ectoconus; the snout was not elongated as in other condylarths such as Arctocyon, but it was longer than that of pantodonts such as Pantolambda.

In lateral view, the dorsal surface of the skull of Periptychus was relatively flat compared to the more domed morphology found in Pantolambda. The zygomatic arches of Periptychus were wide and protruded laterally. The skull was small and low, with well-developed nuchal and sagittal ridges. The latter, in particular, was robust and provided a substantial insertion point for the temporal muscles along the entire length of the cranial box. The paired nasal bones were very elongated and went to form a wide, flat "roof" over the rostrum. The maxilla was characterized by an unusual pitted surface, just above the tooth row; these holes, concentrated mainly above the premolars and around the infraorbital foramen, varied in shape and size: some were circular and others ovoid, and did not exceed 0.7 millimeters in diameter. In the living animal, these holes probably housed a network of capillaries that supply blood to the jaws and were connected to the vibrissae.

The mandible of Periptychus was particularly robust; the paired dental bones were co-ossified toward the end, and went to form a high mandibular symphysis that extended from the incisors to the ventral limit of the mandible, at the level of the anterior margin of the second inferior premolar. The ascending ramus of the mandible was rather high in relation to the mandibular body, and went to form a rounded, high and wide coronoid process.

The dentition of Periptychus was distinctive: the premolars were larger than the molars and possessed highly expanded central cusps, while the molars were highly bunodont and possessed bulbous cusps compressed at the apex. The dental enamel was strongly crenulated with well-aligned ridges, typical of all periptychids but reaching their maximum development in Periptychus. The canine was relatively small and single-rooted.

=== Postcranial skeleton ===
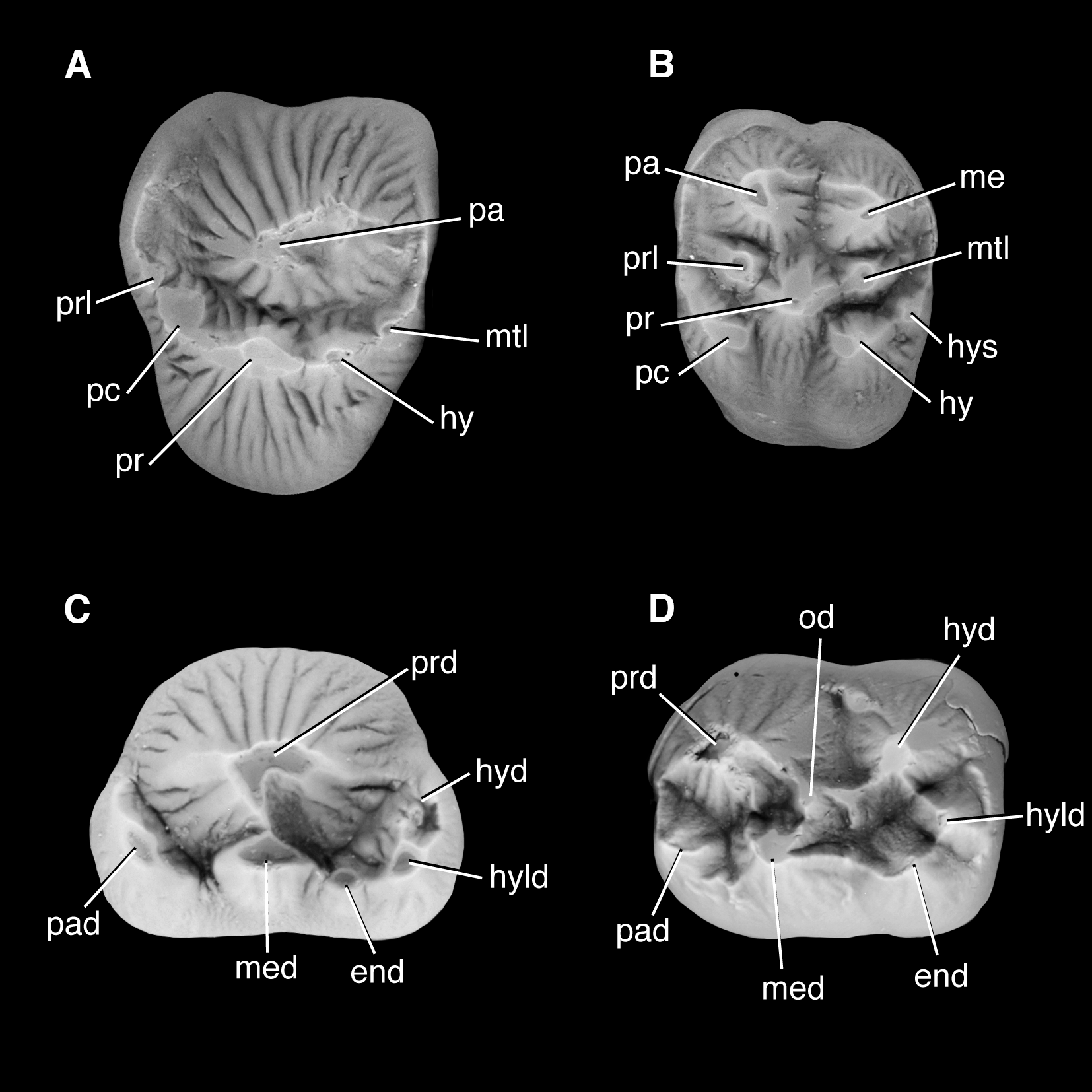
Morphology of the teeth of P. carinidens

The postcranial skeleton of Periptychus was that of a robust, strong-footed animal with a plantigrade gait. The lumbar vertebrae were robust and dorsoventrally compressed. The caudal vertebrae were also robust, rod-like; the tail must have been rather long and heavy, although not as long as that of Ectoconus.

The forelimbs were mainly characterized by a humerus that was rather short compared to ulna and radius, with a hemispherical head equipped with large low tuberosities; the humerus also had a wide and elongated deltopectoral region and a region for the insertion of the teres major muscle that was rather small. Expanded medial and lateral entepicondyles were also present, and the humerus-radial joint was open. The ulna was rather straight and gracile, with a posterior bulge of the diaphysis, while the olecranon was massive and formed an almost rectangular projection at the proximal part of the ulna. The radius was robust compared to the ulna. The carpus was wide and had an enlarged central bone. The hand had five fingers, and the number of phalanges was the generalist number for mammals (2-3-3-3). The bones of the fingers were rather short and compact, and ended in nail-like hoof phalanges.

The ilium of Periptychus was slender and elongated, and in dorsal view was concave in the central area. The femur was typical of a robustly built animal, and it had strong trochanters; a third trochanter was present. The greater trochanter was high but did not extend beyond the head of the femur. The tibia was also strong, but somewhat elongated, while the fibula was small. The foot of Periptychus was plantigrade, pentadactylous and paraxonic in structure, with wide toes well spaced apart, much like those of the hand. The astragalus was dorsoventrally compressed, and its joint was wedged between the tibia and fibula, allowing the latter to make contact with the calcaneus. A tibial bone was present, sandwiched between the tendons of the posterior tibial muscle. The phalanges of the tarsus were almost identical to those of the hand, but were slightly larger.

== Classification ==
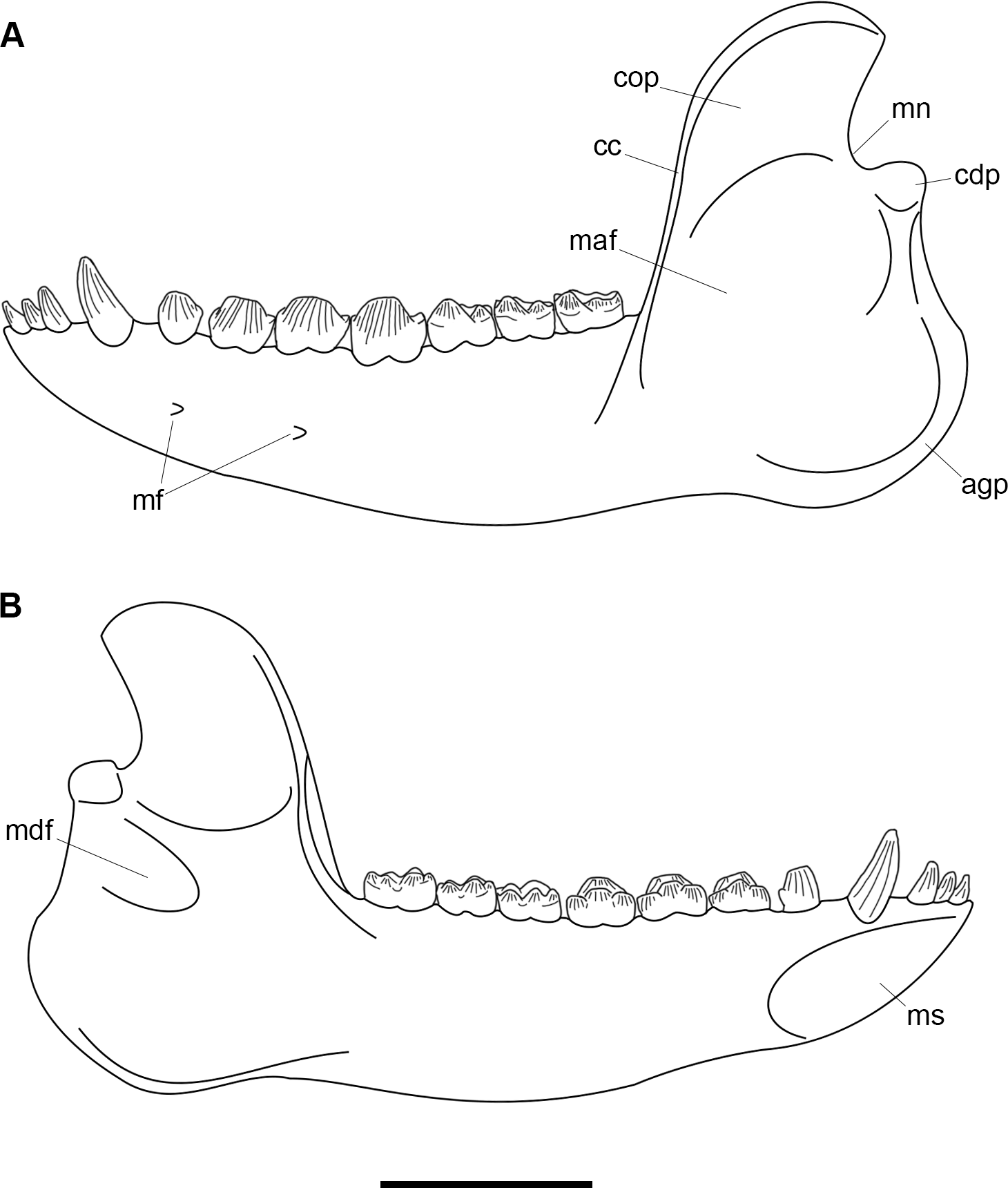
Mandible of P. carinidens

Periptychus was first described by Edward Drinker Cope in 1881, based on fossil remains found in New Mexico in deposits dating to the Middle Paleocene. The fossils were very fragmentary including a part of a jaw with teeth and belonging to a juvenile specimen, which Cope did not recognize as such and assigned it to Creodonta. In the same year Cope described a jawbone, also from New Mexico, and described it as Catathleus rhabdodon. Only later, through the discovery of more complete remains, did it become clear that the two forms were synonymous and belonged to the same species. To the genus Periptychus was then also ascribed by Cope himself the species P. coarctatus (Carsioptychus) which is slightly older and perhaps ancestral to the type species. Fossils of Periptychus have since also been found in Texas, Utah and Wyoming.

Periptychus is the eponymous genus of the family Periptychidae, a family of archaic mammals that developed immediately after the Cretaceous-Tertiary extinction event, and produced a variety of forms of different sizes. In particular, Periptychus would appear to be a derived member of the group.

== Paleobiology ==
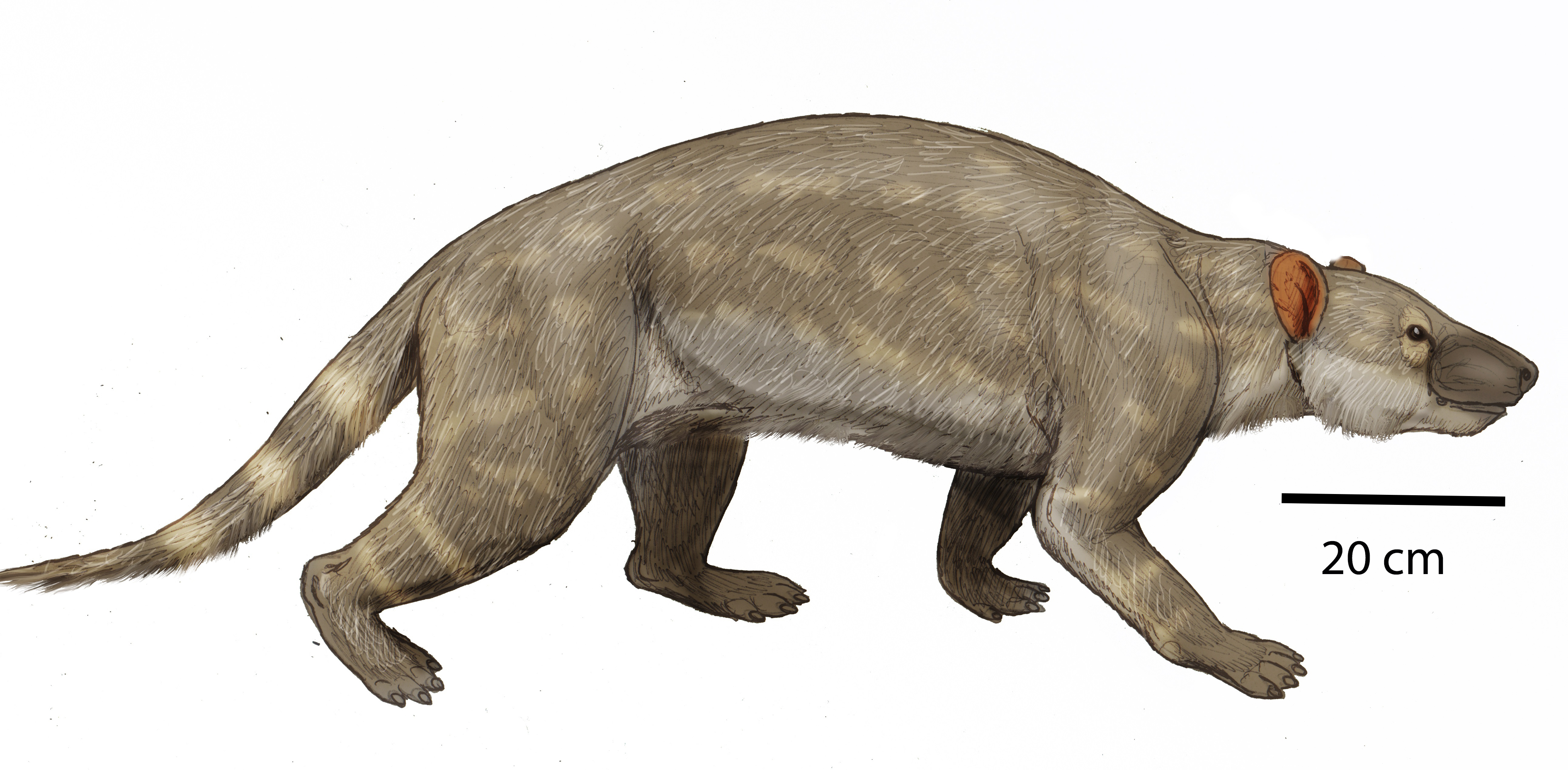
Life restoration of P. carinidens

Periptychus was endowed with many features such as the broad facial region, high sagittal and nuchal ridges, dentition with enlarged premolars and highly developed enamel that indicate a durophagous diet, based on dense, fibrous plants. The postcranial skeleton of Periptychus indicates that this animal was plantigrade, adapted to move slowly over the ground; it was also capable, on occasion, of making rapid movements. Despite its robust structure, Periptychus retained a fairly high degree of movement capacity in its legs: they were very powerful but did not make very rapid movements. The flexor and extensor muscles in the hands and fingers were highly developed, indicating that this animal was probably capable of climbing and digging.
