= Bubodens =

Scientific classification
- Kingdom: Animalia
- Phylum: Chordata
- Class: Mammalia
- Order: †Multituberculata
- Suborder: †Cimolodonta
- Superfamily: †Taeniolabidoidea
- Genus: †Bubodens; Wilson, 1987
- Species: †B. magnus

Binomial name
- †Bubodens magnus Wilson, 1987

Extinct species of mammal

Bubodens magnus is a poorly understood, extinct multituberculate mammal from the Upper Cretaceous of South Dakota. It is known only from a single tooth, and has uncertain placement within the suborder Cimolodonta though has been tentatively argued to belong to Taeniolabidoidea. Based on the dimensions of its molar, this species was estimated to have weighed around 5.25 kilograms (11.6 lb).
