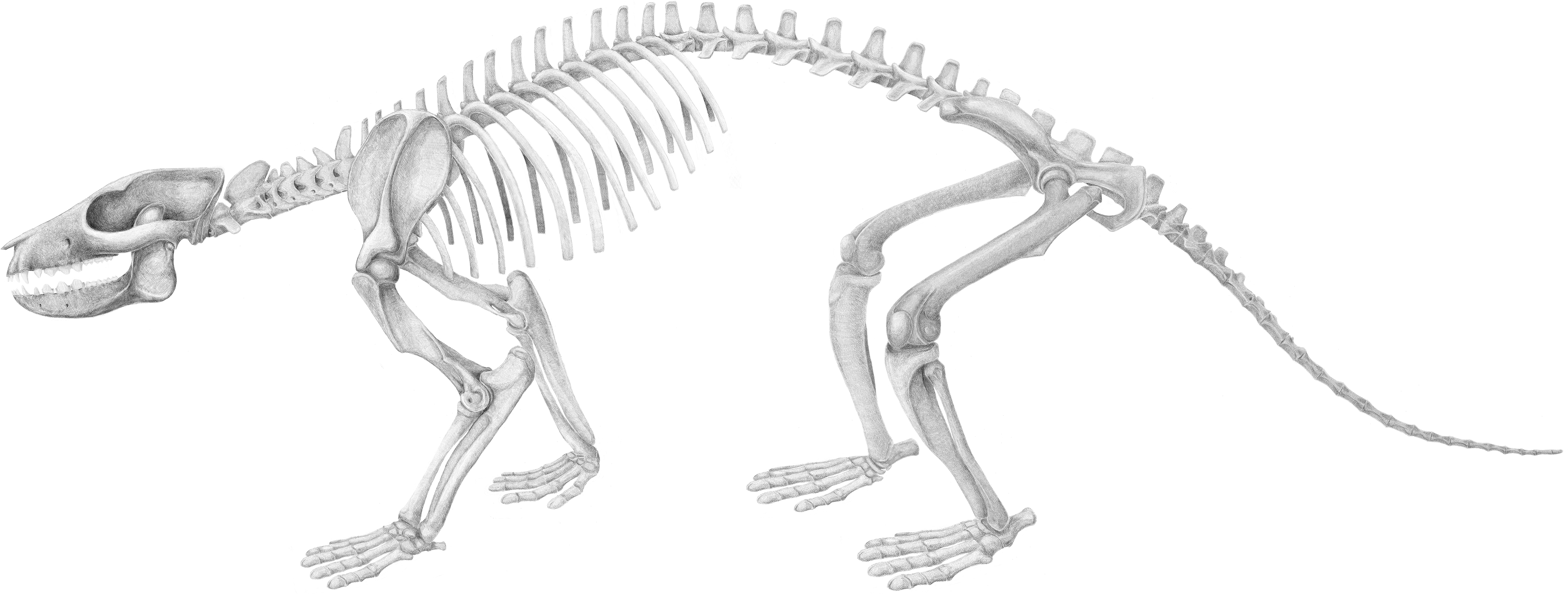
- Skeletal reconstruction of Periptychus

Scientific classification
- Kingdom: Animalia
- Phylum: Chordata
- Class: Mammalia
- Infraclass: Placentalia
- Clade: Paraxonia
- Family: †Periptychidae; Cope, 1882

Subfamilies and genera
- †Anisonchinae: †Alticonus; †Ampliconus; †Anisonchanus; †Haploconus; †Hemithlaeus; †Mimatuta; †Mithrandir; †Conacodontinae: †Conacodon; †Militocodon; †Oxyacodon; †Periptychinae: †Beornus; †Carsioptychus; †Ectoconus; †Maiorana; †Miniconus; †Periptychus; †Tinuviel; incertae sedis: †Auraria; †Goleroconus

= Periptychidae =

Periptychidae Temporal range: Late Cretaceous to Late Paleocene

Extinct family of mammals

Periptychidae is a family of Cretaceous–Paleocene placental mammals, known definitively only from North America. The family is part of a radiation of early herbivorous and omnivorous mammals formerly classified in the extinct order "Condylarthra", which may be related to some or all living ungulates (hoofed mammals). Periptychids are distinguished from other "condylarths" by their teeth, which have swollen premolars and unusual vertical enamel ridges. The family includes both large and small genera, with the larger forms having robust skeletons. Known skeletons of periptychids suggest generalized terrestrial habits.
