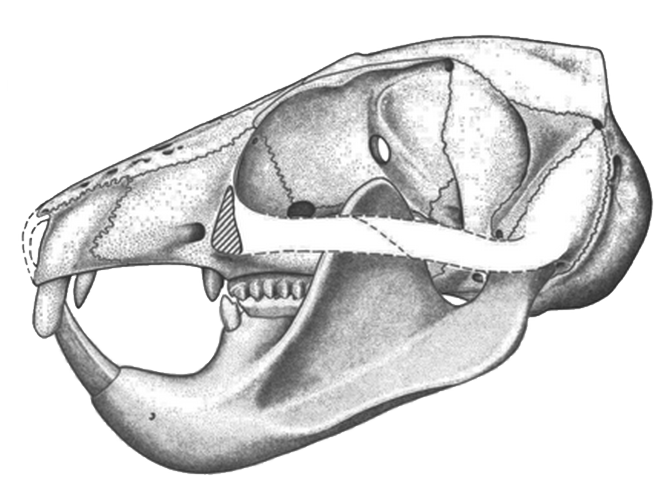
- Lambdopsalis bulla - skull

Scientific classification
- Kingdom: Animalia
- Phylum: Chordata
- Class: Mammalia
- Order: †Multituberculata
- Family: †Lambdopsalidae
- Genus: †Lambdopsalis
- Species: †L. bulla

Binomial name
- †Lambdopsalis bulla Chow & Qi, 1978

= Lambdopsalis =

Lambdopsalis Temporal range: Thanetian ~59–55 Ma

Extinct genus of mammal

Lambdopsalis is an extinct multituberculate mammal from the Late Paleocene of China and Mongolia. It is placed within the suborder Cimolodonta and is a member of the superfamily Taeniolabidoidea. Fossil remains have been found in the Late Paleocene Nomogen and Khashat Formations in Nao-mugen and Bayn Ulan of China and Mongolia, dated to 59-55 million years ago from the Thanetian age. Lambdopsalis bulla is the type species of this genus. The genus and species were named by Chow and Tao Qi in 1978.

Hair and fur fossilize very infrequently, if at all. This genus of multituberculate mammals provides one of the earliest unequivocal examples of mammal fur (Lower Cretaceous fossils of Eomaia, Volaticotherium and Castorocauda with the fur preserved still attached are currently the oldest). Indirect evidence suggest that hair first appeared on non-mammalian therapsids (Therapsida), back in the Triassic or even earlier. This is inferred from small hollows on the bone of the snout similar to holes in the skulls of cats which provide space for concentrations of nerves and blood vessels that innervate prominent whiskers (specialized hairs). This adaptation allows cats to use their whiskers as effective tactile sensory organs.

In the same Upper Paleocene strata, exceptionally preserved coprolites, originally excreted by unknown carnivorous animals, were discovered to contain undigested remains, including hair from Lambdopsalis and three other different mammal taxa.

Studies on its tooth prism and enamel patterns have been performed. It had deciduous enamel, and there is evidence that adults and juveniles had substantially different diets. Cervical vertebrae C2-C3 or C2-C3-C4 appear to be typically fused in individuals of this genus. Based on its robust humerus bones, its flat skull, its fused and stiff neck bones, and thick enamel on its lower incisors, it is believed that this genus was either partially or fully adapted to a burrowing (fossorial) lifestyle. Kielan-Jaworowska and Qi suggest similar locomotive behavior to the modern golden mole. Fully grown L.bulla individuals were estimated to have had a body mass of 0.78 kilograms (1.7 lb) and skull length of about 60.8 millimetres (2.39 in).
