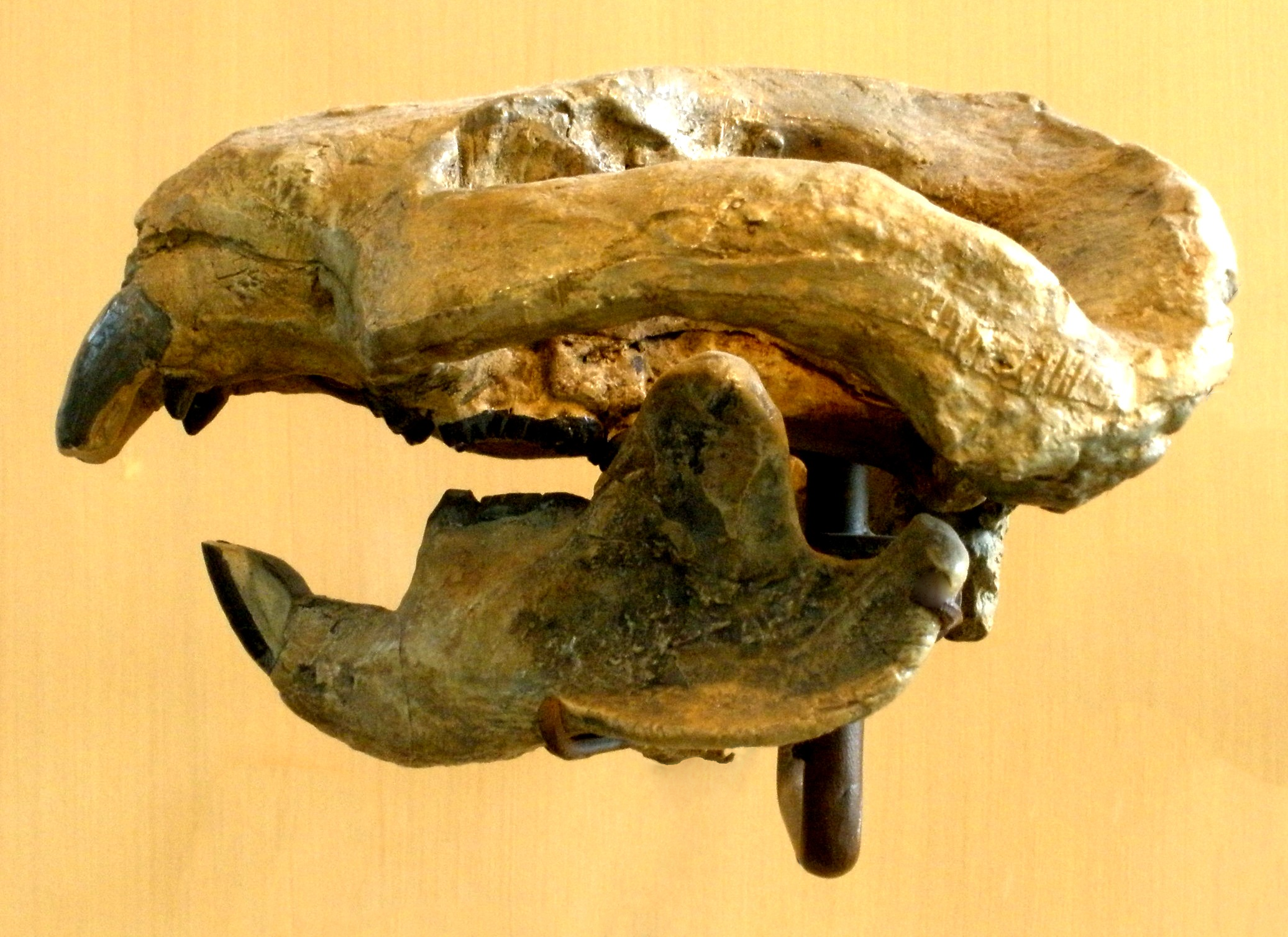
- Taeniolabis taoensis

Scientific classification
- Domain: Eukaryota
- Kingdom: Animalia
- Phylum: Chordata
- Class: Mammalia
- Order: †Multituberculata
- Family: †Taeniolabididae
- Genus: †Taeniolabis; Cope, 1882

Type species
- Taeniolabis taoensis Cope, 1882

Other species
- T. lamberti Simmons, 1987

= Taeniolabis =

Taeniolabis Temporal range: Danian, 65–64 Ma

Extinct genus of rodent-like mammals from the Paleocene epoch

Taeniolabis ("banded incisor") is a genus of extinct multituberculate mammal from the Paleocene of North America.

== Description ==
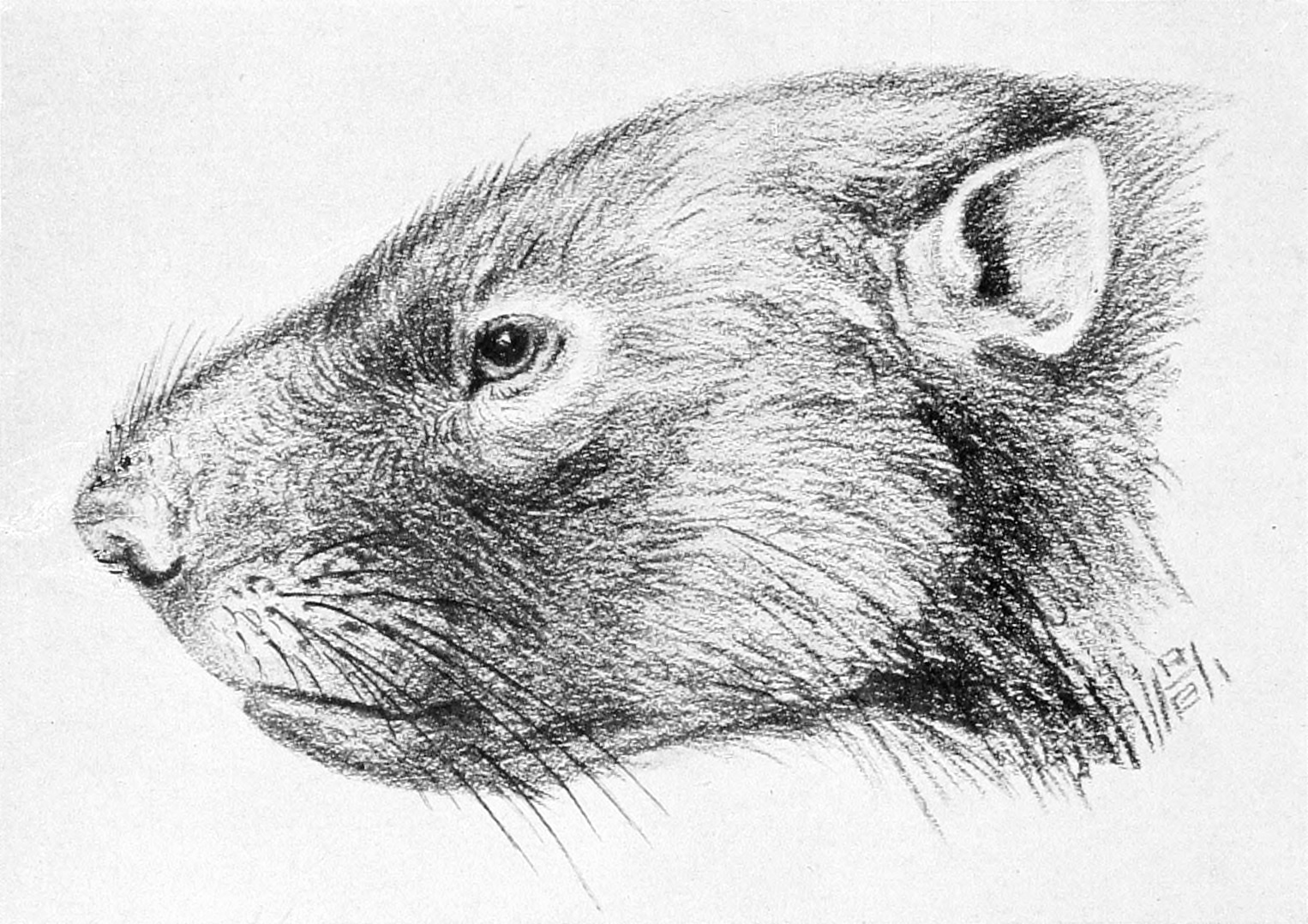
Restoration of T. taoensis

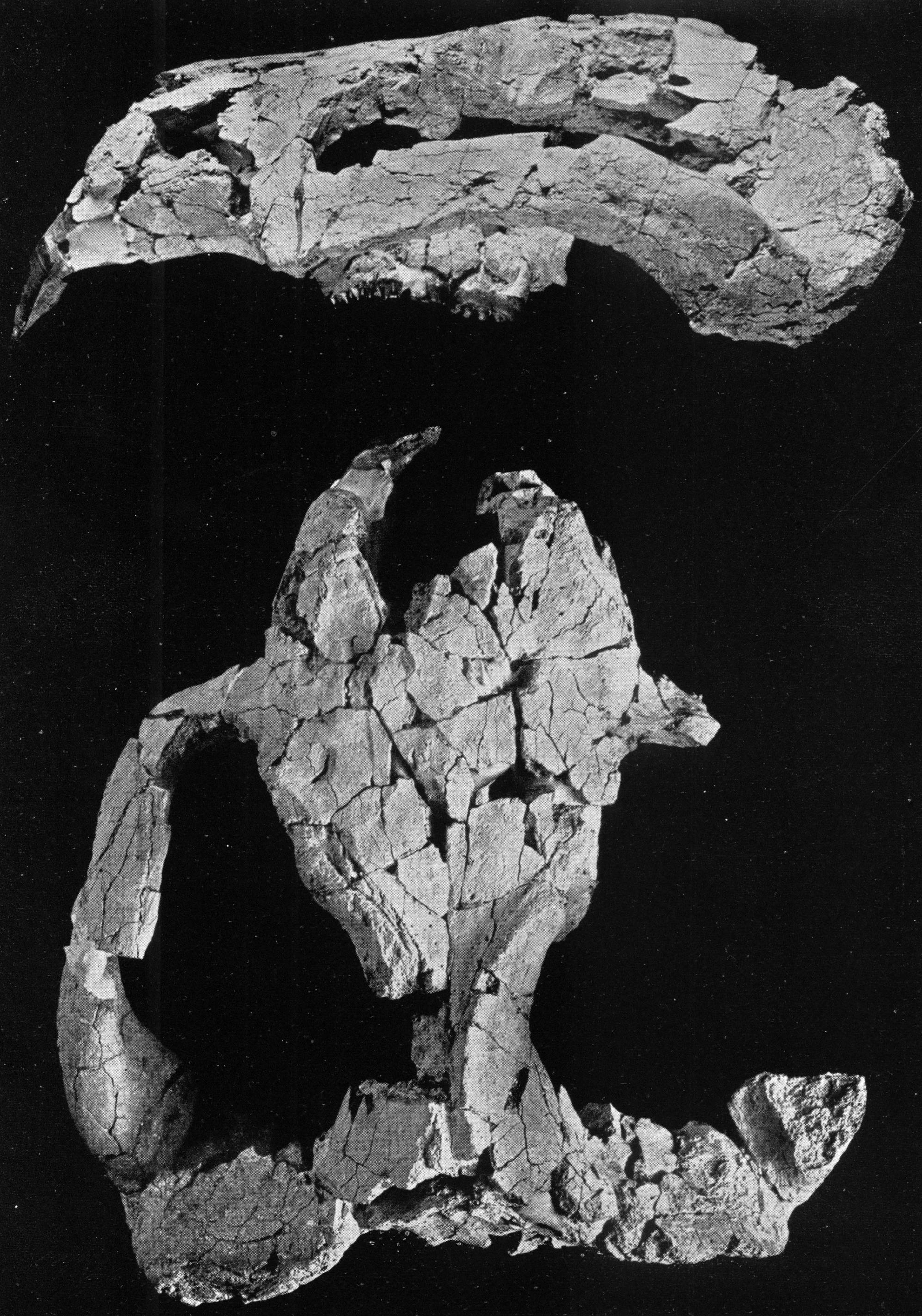
Taeniolabis taoensis skull, Am. Mus. 16321.

Taeniolabis is a member of the Taeniolabidoidea, a superfamily of multituberculates that are known for their highly derived teeth, and a short wide snout with a blocky head. The teeth modifications were likely an adaptation for herbivory that may have resulted from rapid diversification of angiosperms at the very end of the Cretaceous, which would thus have created opportunities for novel specialization in herbivores. T. taoensis possessed an elongate, gently curved cochlear canal and an enlarged vestibule. It is the largest known multituberculate, as well as the largest allotherian mammal, with T. taoensis weighing up to 34 kilograms (75 lb). Species under this genus have been known under other names. Taeniolabis taoensis is found frequently enough and in a very limited time range that it can be used as an index fossil for the Puercan faunal stage within Danian aged fossil deposits.

== Taxonomy ==
=== History ===
It is within the suborder of Cimolodonta and is a member of the superfamily Taeniolabidoidea. The genus was named by Edward Drinker Cope in 1882. Species have also been placed with the genera Catopsalis and Polymastodon.

=== Species ===
- Taeniolabis lamberti was named by Nancy Simmons in 1987. It has been found in the Danian aged Tullock Formation of Montana. It is not quite as large as T. taoensis, but still a hefty size for a multituberculate, weighing around 11 kilograms (24 lb).

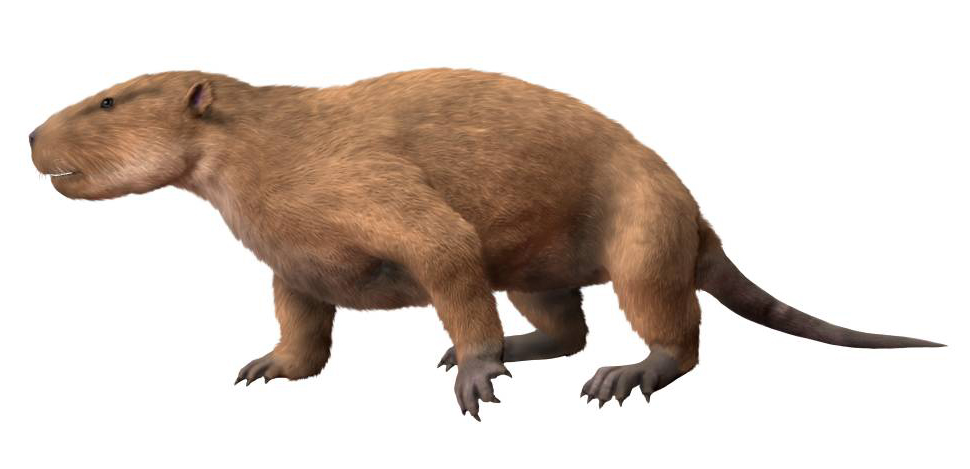
Life reconstruction of Taeniolabis taoensis

- Taeniolabis taoensis was originally named Taeniolabis sulcatus by Cope in 1882 as the type species of the genus. It was later renamed as T. taoensis. Known fossils date to approximately 64 million years of age. They are found in Danian aged deposits of the Nacimiento Formation of New Mexico, the Ravenscrag Formation of Saskatchewan and the Denver Formation of Colorado. This species likely had a roughly16 centimetres (6.3 in) long skull and had an average body mass of 22.7 kilograms (50 lb), which is approximately the size of a modern beaver. The species was once considered to have had a body mass of up to 100 kg and sized like a sheep or larger by extrapolating body size on the basis of their huge teeth. However, improved analyses and the realization that the teeth were extraordinarily robust due to herbivory rather has generally disproved that.
