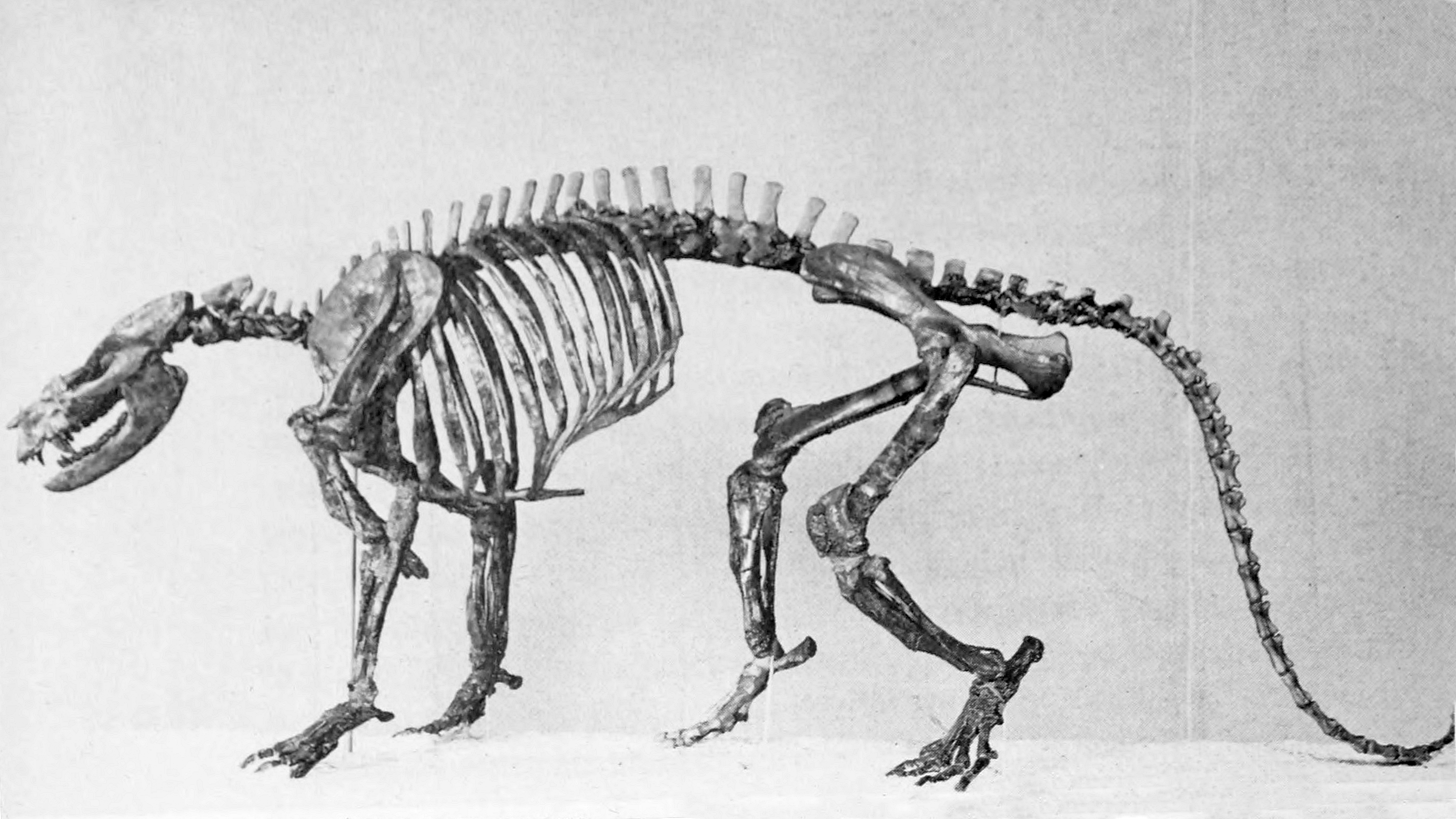

Scientific classification
- Kingdom: Animalia
- Phylum: Chordata
- Class: Mammalia
- Family: †Periptychidae
- Subfamily: †Periptychinae
- Genus: †Ectoconus; Cope, 1884

Type species
- †Ectoconus ditrigonus

Species
- E. cavigellii Eberle and Lillegraven, 1998; E. ditrigonus (Cope, 1882) (syn. E. majusculus Matthew, 1937), E. symbolus Gazin, 1939

= Ectoconus =

Ectoconus Temporal range: early Paleocene

Genus of mammals (fossil)

Ectoconus (Greek: "outside" (ektos), "cone" (konos)) is an extinct genus of terrestrial herbivorous mammal of the family Periptychidae, endemic to North America during the Early Paleocene subepochs (66—63.3 mya) existing for approximately 2.7 million years. Its skull is about 16 cm in length.

== Taxonomy ==
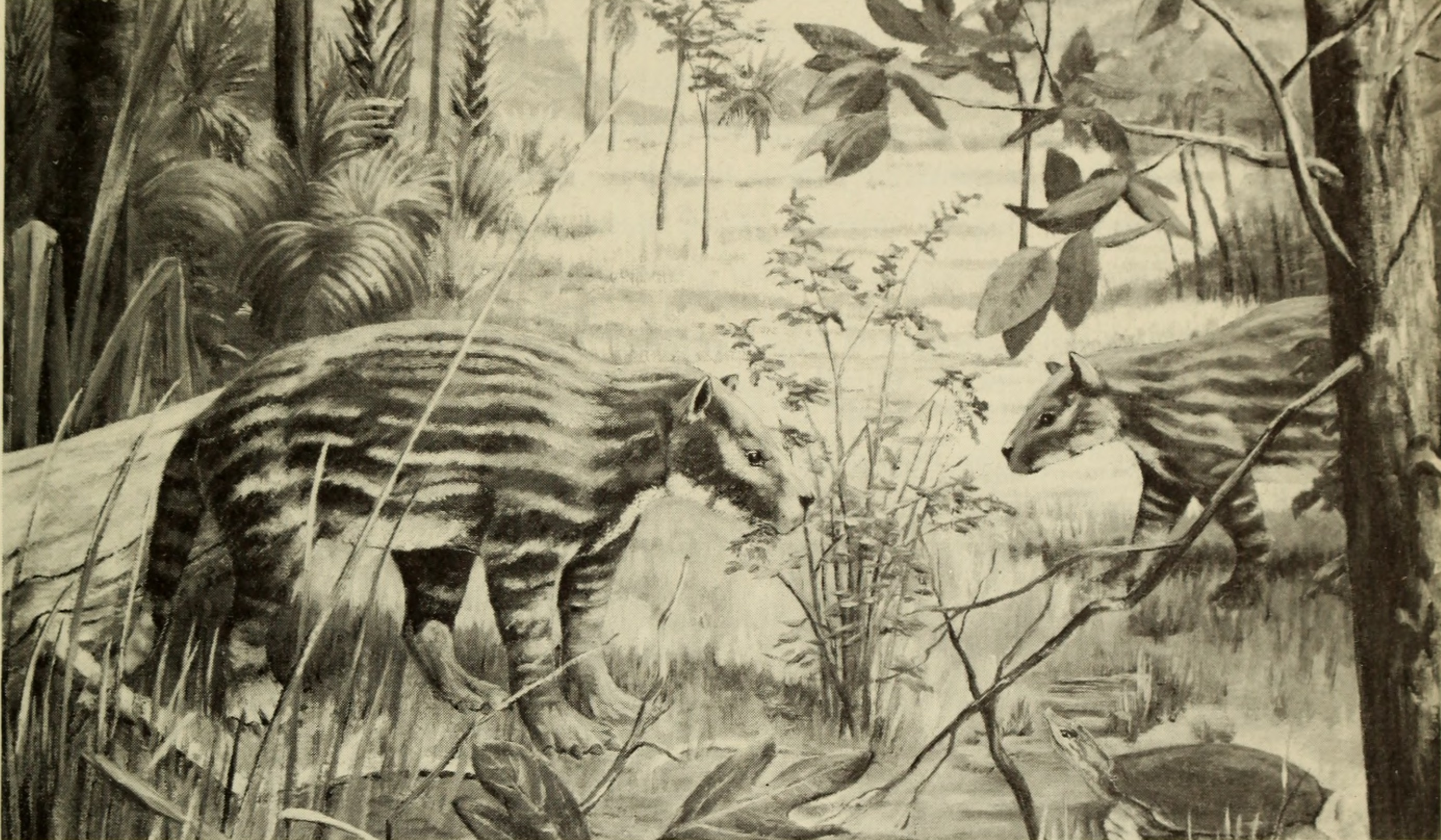
Restoration

Ectoconus was stoutly built, sheep-sized condylarth and had a small braincase, short, strong limbs and a heavy tail. Its feet had five hooved digits much in the manner of extremely primitive ungulates. It was named by Cope (1884) and was synonymized subjectively with Conoryctes by Cope (1885). It was assigned to Periptychidae by Cope (1884), Cope (1888), Osborn and Earle (1895), Matthew (1937) and Carroll (1988); and to Periptychinae by Archibald (1998) and Eberle (2003).

Nearly complete skeletons of Ectoconus have been found in New Mexico and it is one of the most completely known Paleocene mammals.
