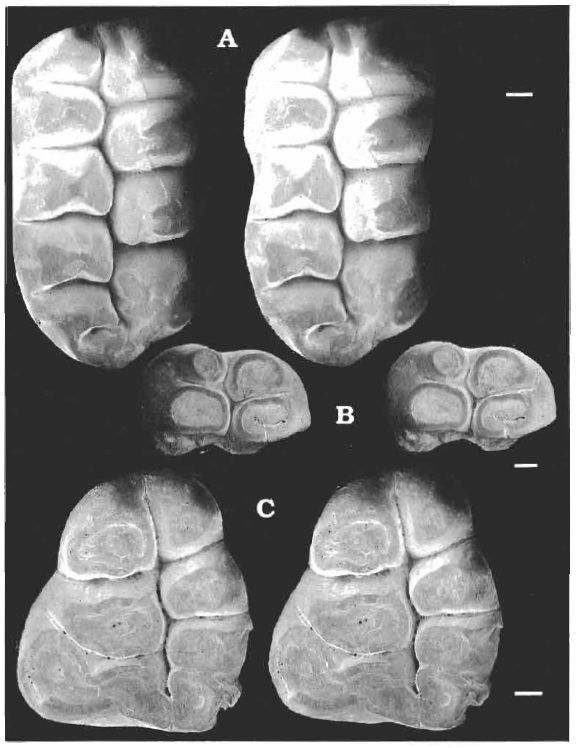
- Catopsalis waddleae

Scientific classification
- Kingdom: Animalia
- Phylum: Chordata
- Class: Mammalia
- Order: †Multituberculata
- Superfamily: †Taeniolabidoidea
- Genus: †Catopsalis; Cope, 1884

Species
- C. alexanderi Middleton, 1982; C. calgariensis Russell, 1926; C. fissidens Cope, 1884; C. foliatus Cope, 1882 (type); C. kakwa Scott, Weil and Theodor, 2018; C. waddleae Buckley, 1995

= Catopsalis =

Catopsalis Temporal range: Paleocene, 66–63 Ma

Extinct genus of mammals

Catopsalis is a genus of extinct mammal from the Paleocene of North America. This animal was a relatively large member of the extinct order of Multituberculata. Most multituberculates were much smaller.

At one time, the genus was also formally reported from the upper Cretaceous of Mongolia. However, that material was subsequently referred to the genera of Djadochtatherium and Catopsbaatar. Catopsalis is within the suborder of Cimolodonta and a member of the superfamily Taeniolabidoidea.

Recent research suggests that "Catopsalis" is actually a paraphyletic assemblage, and one species, C. joyneri, has been moved to its own genus, Valenopsalis.

== Species ==
The species Catopsalis foliatus was named by Cope E.D. in 1882. It has also been known as C. johnstoni (Fox R.C. 1989) and Polymastodon foliatus (Cope 1884). This species has been found in Puercan (Paleocene)-age strata of the San Juan Basin of New Mexico and in the Ravenscrag Formation of Canada. C. johnstoni, from Saskatchewan, is also in the Alberta collection.

The species Catopsalis fissidens was named by Cope E.D. in 1884. It has also been known as C. utahensis (Gazin C.L., 1939) and Polymastodon fissidens (Cope, 1884). It has been found in the Torrejonian (Paleocene)-age beds in the San Juan Basin of New Mexico and Utah. The University of Wyoming boasts a possible specimen.

The species Catopsalis calgariensis was named by Russell L.S. in 1926. Remains were found in Paleocene-age strata of Wyoming and Alberta, Canada. The holotype, collected in 1924, is in the collection of Alberta University. Further material is in the possession of Wyoming University.

The species Catopsalis alexanderi was named by Middleton M.D. in 1982. It is found in the Puercan (Paleocene)-age Littleton Local Fauna of Colorado, Montana and Wyoming (United States), dating from 66 - 63 million years ago. Specimens are included in the collections of the American Museum of Natural History in New York and the Peabody Museum of Natural History at Yale University.

The species Catopsalis waddleae was named by Buckley G.A. in 1995. It has been found in the Puercan age beds of the Simpson Quarry of Montana. Relative to the other species it is an extreme heavyweight. Remains of this species have also recently been discovered in the Idaho panhandle region.
