= Zidek =

Zidek may refer to:

- Zídek, Czech surname
- Žídek/Židek, Czech and Slovak surname
- Anna Carin Zidek (born 1973), Swedish biathlete
- George Zidek (born 1973), Czech basketball player
- Jiri Zidek (paleontologist), Czech-born American paleontologist
