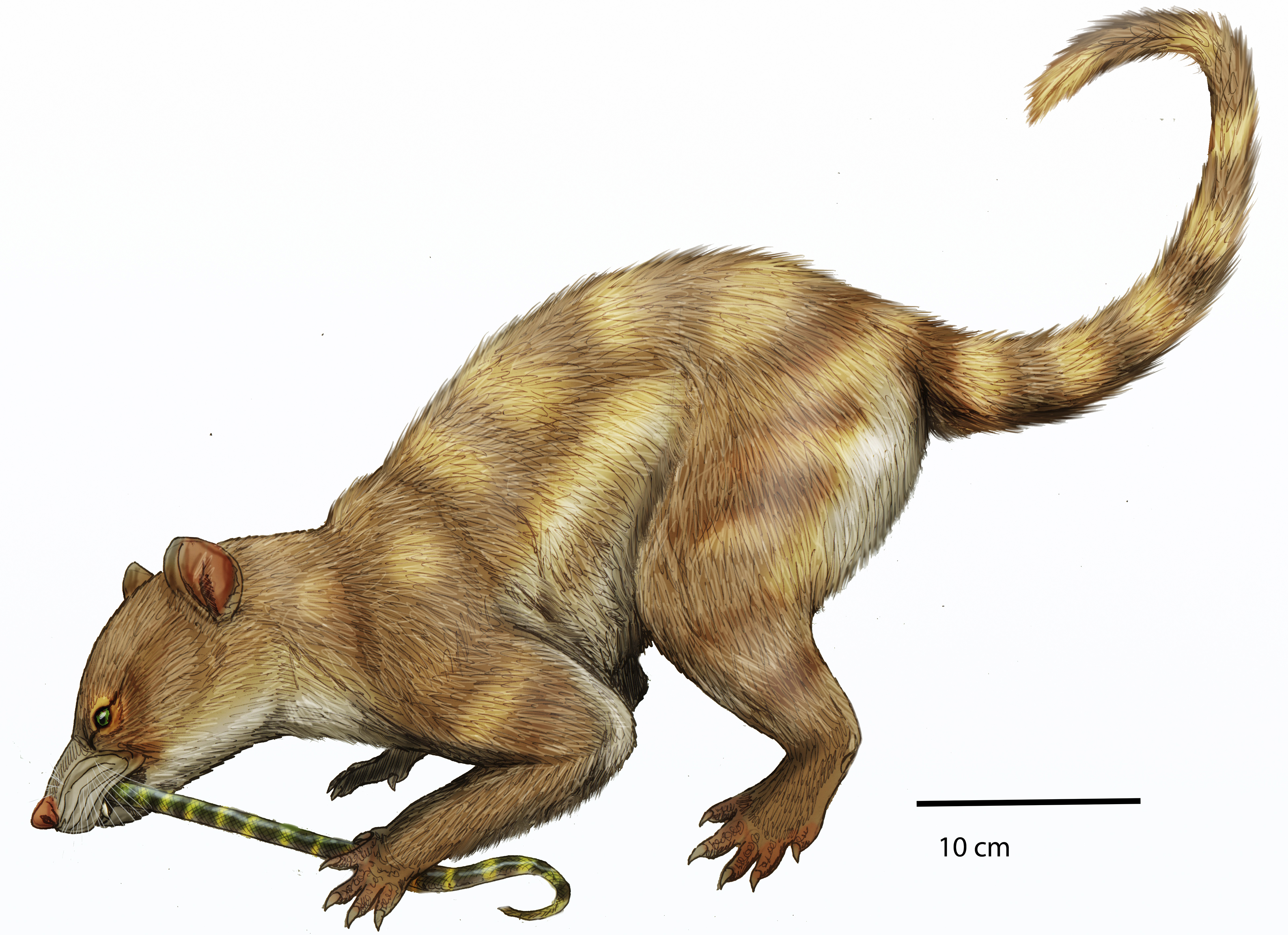
- Life reconstruction of Chriacus sp.

Scientific classification
- Kingdom: Animalia
- Phylum: Chordata
- Class: Mammalia
- Order: †Arctocyonia
- Family: †Arctocyonidae
- Genus: †Chriacus; Cope, 1883

Type species
- †Lipodectes pelvidens Cope, 1881

Species
- †C. badgleyi Gingerich, 1989; †C. baldwini (Cope, 1882); †C. calenancus Van Valen, 1978; †C. gallinae Matthew & Granger, 1915; †C. katrinae Van Valen, 1978; †C. metocometi Van Valen, 1978; †C. oconostotae Van Valen, 1978; †C. orthogonius Russell, 1929; †C. pelvidens (Cope, 1881); †C. punitor (Simpson, 1935)

Synonyms
- Genus synonymy: Metachriacus Simpson, 1935; Spanoxyodon Simpson, 1935; Tricentes (in part) Cope, 1883; Species synonymy: C. pusillus Simpson, 1935 (synonym of C. punitor); C. schlosserianus Cope, 1888 (synonym of C. baldwini); C. stenops Cope, 1888 (synonym of C. pelvidens); C. truncatus Cope, 1884 (synonym of C. baldwini); M. provocator Simpson, 1935 (synonym of C. baldwini); M. punitor Simpson, 1935 (synonym of C. orthogonius?); S. latrunculus Simpson, 1935 (synonym of C. baldwini); T. crassicollidens Cope, 1884 (synonym of C. baldwini)

= Chriacus =

Chriacus Temporal range: early Paleocene–early Eocene, (Puercan 2–Wasatchian)

Extinct genus of mammals

Chriacus is an extinct genus of placental mammals that lived in what is now North America during the Paleocene and early Eocene epochs (Puercan through Wasatchian faunal ages). In life, members of the genus may have looked and lived in ways similar to coatimundis, though they were not closely related to any living mammal. Like many early Cenozoic mammals, its relationships are uncertain, with possible affinities to ungulates or Ferae (carnivorans and their relatives). Chriacus and similar Paleocene-Eocene mammals are generally known as arctocyonids, though it is unclear whether different arctocyonids are actually related to each other.

== Paleobiology ==
Chriacus were probably omnivores, eating fruit, eggs, insects and small mammals.

=== Climbing adaptations ===
Chriacus has better-preserved fossils than most other Paleocene mammals. The most complete skeleton belongs to an uncertain species (Chriacus sp.) from the Willwood Formation of Wyoming. In life, it would have measured around 1 metre (3.3 ft) long, including a long, robust tail, which may or may not have been prehensile. Other features include a light build, weighing approximately 5–7 kilograms (11–15 lb), and many adaptations typical of animals that live in trees. These include the ability to walk on the soles of their five-toed feet, as well as claws which are long, curved, and compressed. The powerfully-built limbs have flexible joints, especially the ankles, an adaptation that allows an animal to turn its hind feet behind it, like modern tree squirrels, in order to climb downward.

=== Senses ===
Analysis of casts of the brain and inner ear from C. pelvidens and C. baldwini suggest these animals depended more on their sense of smell than sight, may have been able to hear about as well as a modern aardvark, and were slow-moving to moderately agile.

The encephalization quotient (EQ) had a range of 0.12–0.41 (1.0 is set as an average brain size in modern mammals of a similar body size) and the neocortex was less developed than later mammals. By the standards of modern mammals, Chriacus would have been neither especially quick nor intelligent, but their brains were comparable to many mammals of their time.

Derived features of the inner ear were shared with fossils that are assigned to Euungulata (artiodactyls+perissodactyls), suggesting the genus may be close to the origin of ungulates, though it is too different in form to be a direct ancestor.

== Classification ==
=== Species ===
At least nine species are currently recognized in the genus, though it is unknown whether all of these species share exclusive ancestry with each other. Variation within the genus (at its widest concept) is unusually high. Chriacus fossils from the Willwood Formation point towards a slow, climbing lifestyle similar to some scansorial carnivorans such as raccoons. Others, such as a C. baldwini skeleton from New Mexico, are oddly similar to Diacodexis, a fleet-footed early artiodactyl related to deer and antelope.

| Species | Author and Year | Notes |
|---|---|---|
| C. badgleyi | Gingerich, 1989 | A small species from the Wasatchian 0 age of Clarks Fork Basin, Wyoming. Name honors Dr. Catherine Badgley. |
| C. baldwini | (Cope, 1882) | A medium-sized species from the Torrejonian age of New Mexico, Wyoming, Utah, Montana, and Texas. Molars similar to C. baldwini are also found in the Roche Percée local fauna of Saskatchewan (Ravenscrag Formation, Tiffanian 4 age). |
| C. calenancus | Van Valen, 1978 | Based on teeth from Montana. Puercan 2 to Torrejonian 1 in age, this species of Chriacus may be the oldest and most herbivorous in the genus. Name means "green jaws" in J.R.R. Tolkien's Sindarin language. May be a junior synonym of C. baldwini. |
| C. gallinae | Matthew & Granger, 1915 | From the Wasatchian-age Almagre fauna, in the San Jose Formation of New Mexico. The original tooth fossils of this species were missing as of 1971, and may not actually qualify as Chriacus. Similar teeth are also known from the Powder River fauna of Wyoming. |
| C. katrinae | Van Valen, 1978 | Based on a jaw from Rock Bench Quarry in Bighorn Basin, Wyoming. Named after Van Valen's daughter. Rock Bench Quarry is late Torrejonian in age. |
| C. metocometi | Van Valen, 1978 | Based on an upper molar from Mason Pocket in southwestern Colorado. Named after the Wampanoag chief Metacomet. Mason Pocket is Tiffanian 4 in age. |
| C. oconostotae | Van Valen, 1978 | Based on fossils from Wyoming: Cedar Point Quarry in Bighorn Basin and the Chappo type locality in the Green River Basin. Also reported from the Paskapoo Formation of Alberta. All of these sites are Tiffanian 3 in age. Named after the Cherokee chief Oconostota. |
| C. orthogonius | Russell, 1929 | From the Torrejonian age of Alberta, Montana, and New Mexico. |
| C. pelvidens | (Cope, 1881) | The type species of Chriacus, originally regarded as a species of Lipodectes. A large species from the Torrejonian age of New Mexico, Wyoming, and possibly Texas. |
| C. punitor | (Simpson, 1935) | From the Torrejonian age of New Mexico, Montana, and Alberta. Formerly known as Metachriacus punitor. Sometimes regarded as a synonym of C. orthogonius, though other times regarded as a valid species of its own. |

=== Affinities ===
Like most early placental mammals, the classification of Chriacus in relation to other groups is disputed. Halliday et al. (2015) consider it a member of the family Oxyclaenidae, a sister group to palaeoryctids and creodonts, while Tabuce et al. (2011) classify it as an arctocyonid, most closely related to Loxolophus, then Arctocyon, and allied to the Mesonychia.

This difference mirrors the history of the mammals classified as arctocyonids. They were first considered creodonts (imagined to be the ancestors of modern carnivorans), and then "condylarths" (imagined to be the ancestors of hoofed mammals). Modern studies suggest the confusion is due to the fact that ungulates, carnivorans, and creodonts are related groups, and flesh-eating lineages and adaptations evolved within each of them. Chriacus lies somewhere within the range of their early relatives.
