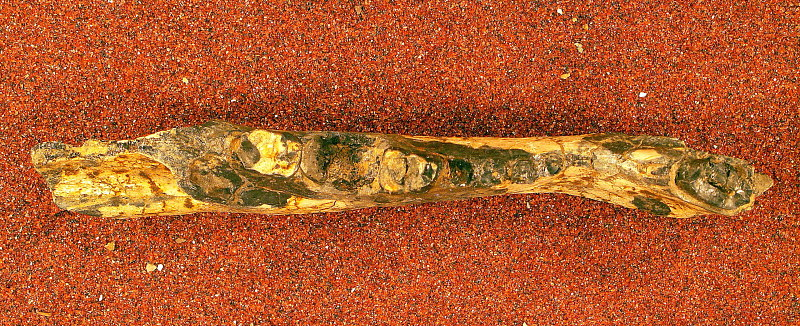
- Mentoclaenodon acrogenius

Scientific classification
- Kingdom: Animalia
- Phylum: Chordata
- Class: Mammalia
- Infraclass: Placentalia
- Order: †Arctocyonia
- Family: †Arctocyonidae
- Subfamily: †Arctocyoninae
- Genus: †Mentoclaenodon; Weigelt, 1960

= Mentoclaenodon =

Mentoclaenodon Temporal range: Late Paleocene

Extinct genus of mammals

Mentoclaenodon is an extinct genus of arctocyonid ungulate mammals.

Mentoclaenodon had large upper canines comparable to the "saber-teeth" of various Miocene and Pleistocene feliform saber-toothed cats. This genus and its sister-genus Anacodon, and the oxyaenid Machaeroides were the first true mammals to develop saber-teeth. (The various saber-tooth gorgonopsian genera, such as Inostrancevia and Ruhuhucerberus, are regarded as "stem-mammals" that are close relatives of true mammals). Fossils of Mentoclaenodon are found in late Paleocene-aged strata of Cernay, France, and in strata of Walbeck, Germany. The average estimated skull length is 15 cm.

Mentoclaenodon is one of the largest European mammals during the Paleocene. It is also thought to be one of the earliest known Cenozoic-aged mammalian predators that would have preyed on other mammals. Mentoclaenodon and its ancestors reigned from the Cretaceous to the Paleocene. By the early Eocene the arctocyonids were supplanted by the hyaenodonts, mesonychians and the early carnivorans such as Miacis.
