= Loxolophus =

Loxolophus Temporal range: Lower Palaeocene

Scientific classification
- Domain: Eukaryota
- Kingdom: Animalia
- Phylum: Chordata
- Class: Mammalia
- Order: †Arctocyonia
- Family: †Arctocyonidae
- Genus: †Loxolophus; Cope, 1885

Type species
- †Loxolophus hyattianus Cope, 1885

Species
- †Loxolophus priscus Cope, 1888

Extinct mammal genus

Loxolophus is a genus of large arctocyonid from the early Palaeocene of North America. Two species are currently recognised: the type species, Loxolophus hyattianus, and L. priscus.

== Taxonomy ==
=== Early history ===
The holotype of Loxolophus (AMNH 3121), a fragment of the left maxilla, was formally described by Edward Drinker Cope in 1885. Cope initially assigned it to Chriacus, and gave it the binomial name C. hyattianus. In the same paper, a single page later, he described Loxolophus adapinus. Subsequently, they turned out to represent the same taxon, which at some point thereafter was recombined as Loxolophus hyattianus. A second species, L. priscus, was named three years after the initial paper, also by Cope, who similarly assigned it to Chriacus. Subsequently, it was reassigned to Protochriacus by William Berryman Scott in 1892, then synonymised with Chriacus pugnax by George Gaylord Simpson in 1935, and finally was assigned to Loxolophus by William Diller Matthew in 1937.

=== Classification ===
A phylogenetic analysis by Peter E. Kondrashov and Spencer G. Lucas in 2015 recovered Arctocyonidae as a paraphyletic lineage of archaic ungulates, wherein Loxolophus forms a sister taxon to a clade consisting of Arctocyon, Desmatoclaenus, Protogonodon, Deuterogonodon and Tricentes. Another analysis published that year, published by Thomas J. D. Halliday, Paul Upchurch and Anjali Goswami, recovered Loxolophus as part of a clade also including Anacodon, Oxyclaenus, and several other traditional arctocyonid genera, distantly related to pangolins.
