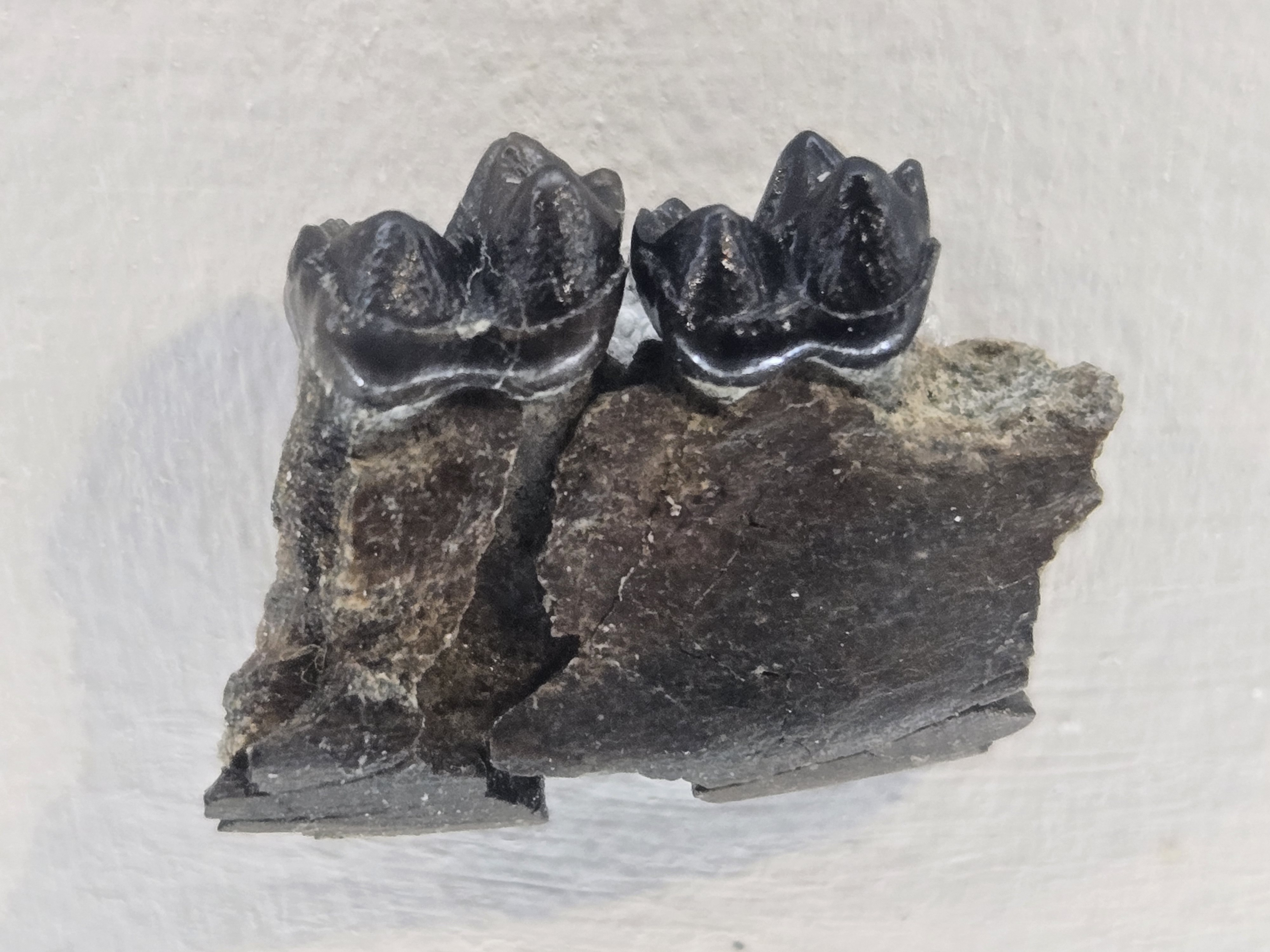
- A partial jaw of Oxyclaenus corax from the Willow Creek Formation of Alberta

Scientific classification
- Kingdom: Animalia
- Phylum: Chordata
- Class: Mammalia
- Family: †Triisodontidae
- Genus: †Oxyclaenus; Cope, 1884

Type species
- †Oxyclaenus cuspidatus Cope, 1884

Species
- †Oxyclaenus cuspidatus Cope, 1884; †Oxyclaenus antiquus Simpson, 1935

= Oxyclaenus =

Oxyclaenus Temporal range: Lower Palaeocene

Extinct genus of mammal

Oxyclaenus is an extinct genus genus of triisodontid from the Lower Palaeocene of North America. Originally named as a subgenus of Mioclaenus, it is now regarded as a genus of its own, with Mioclaenus being a junior synonym of the genus. The genus currently consists of two species, the type species O. cuspidatus, and O. antiquus. O. simplex was moved to Carcinodon.

== Taxonomy ==
=== Early history ===
The genus Oxyclaenus was originally erected by Edward Drinker Cope in 1884, as one of two subgenera of Mioclaenus. It was distinguished from the other subgenus, conventional Mioclaenus, by the lack of an internal tubercle on the third premolar. Three species, O, cuspidatus, O. simplex and the now-invalid O. ferox, were also assigned to Oxyclaenus. The type, O. cuspidatus, was distinguished from Mioclaenus by having molars that were wider transversely (diagonally) than anteroposteriorly (from front-to-back). Oxyclaenus was elevated to genus level by William Berryman Scott in 1892, who created a new diagnosis for the genus, and assigned it to a family of its own, Oxyclaenidae. Scott also synonymised O. simplex with O. cuspidatus. A species formerly assigned to Chriacus, C. antiquus, was reassigned to Oxyclaenus by Leigh Van Valen and Robert E. Sloan in 1965. The family Oxyclaenidae briefly became a wastebasket for basal arctocyonids, including Chriacus. In 2004, it was revised by Peter Kondrashov and Spencer G. Lucas and became a subfamily of Arctocyonidae that includes only Oxyclaenus. However, later studies have recovered Oxyclaenus as a Triisodontidae.

=== Other species ===
Over the decades, several species have been assigned to Oxyclaenus that have since been reassigned or reassessed as invalid. O. pugnax, originally assigned to Chriacus, was reassigned to Oxyclaenus by Van Valen and Sloan in 1965. Kondrashov and Lucas determined that it was instead a subjective junior synonym of Loxolophus. O. pearcei, named Charles Lewis Gazin in 1941, and O. corax, named by Paul A. Johnston and Richard C. Fox, in 1984, are likely synonyms of O. simplex. Williamson and Carr (2007) recovered O. simplex as another species of Carcinodon.
