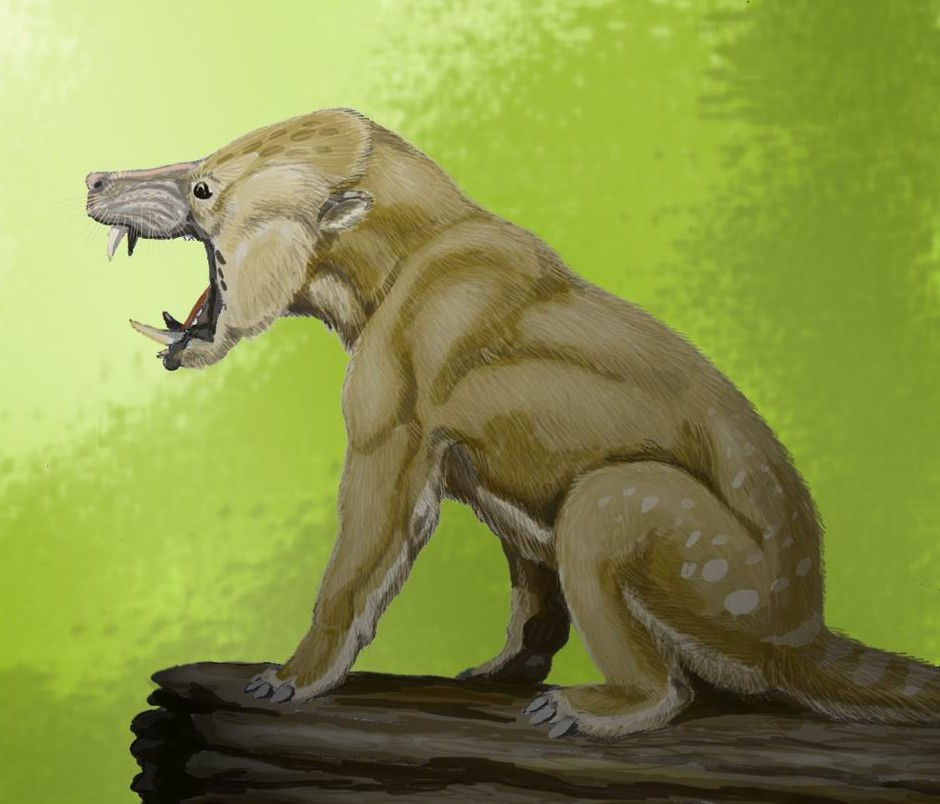
- Arctocyon

Scientific classification
- Kingdom: Animalia
- Phylum: Chordata
- Class: Mammalia
- Infraclass: Placentalia
- Order: †Arctocyonia
- Family: †Arctocyonidae; Giebel, 1855

Subfamilies and genera
- †Karakia Thewissen, Williams & Hussain, 1977; †Loxolophinae Van Valen, 1978; †Platymastus Van Valen, 1978; †Desmatoclaenus Gazin, 1941; †Baioconodon Gazin, 1941; †Loxolophus Cope, 1885; †Mimotricentes Simpson, 1937; †Deuterogonodon Simpson, 1935; †Arctocyoninae Giebel, 1855; †Neoclaenodon Gidley, 1919; †Claenodon Scott, 1892; †Colpoclaenus Patterson & McGrew, 1962; †Mentoclaenodon Weigelt, 1960; †Arctocyonides Lemoine, 1891; †Landenodon Quinet, 1968; †Arctocyon de Blainville, 1841; †Anacodon Cope, 1882

= Arctocyonidae =

Arctocyonidae Temporal range: Early Paleocene to Early Eocene 65.5–53.1 Ma

Extinct family of mammals

Arctocyonidae (from Ancient Greek ἄρκτος (árktos), meaning "bear", and κύων (kúon), meaning "dog", and thus, "bear-dog") is an extinct polyphyletic family of placental mammals which lived from the Early Paleocene to the Early Eocene. They first appeared roughly 500,000 years after the Cretaceous-Paleogene extinction event, which wiped out the non-avian dinosaurs. They were initially regarded as creodonts, though have since been reassigned to an order of their own, the Arctocyonia. They were the most diverse during the Paleocene epoch, although a few such as Anacodon, Chriacus, and Thryptacodon, were present in the Early Eocene. All three genera would go extinct during the Early Eocene roughly 53.1 Ma. Some have suggested that arctocyonids are ancestral to modern-day artiodactyls, or that they form a sister group. However, more recent phylogenetic analyses suggest that arctocyonids may represent an artificial grouping of extinct ungulates, or that they might be an assemblage of unrelated placentals related to pangolins, pantodonts, and periptychids.

Members of Arctocyonidae are characterised by long skulls, with large sagittal crests and very large canines. In the case of Arctocyon proper, the lower canines especially were large enough to require a diastema on the upper jaw to accommodate them. Arctocyonids varied considerably in size and morphology. Smaller genera, like Chriacus, were about the size of a coati, while larger ones, such as Arctocyon, weighed up to 44 kg (97 lb) and stood 45 cm (18 in) at the shoulder. Many arctocyonids have climbing adaptations, suggesting that they were either descended from arboreal taxa, or were arboreal themselves. The North American Anacodon was more robust than other genera, and had adaptations for burrowing as well as climbing. Most genera appear to have been omnivorous, though Anacodon showed signs of an increase in herbivory.

== Taxonomy ==
The family Arctocyonidae was named by Christoph Gottfried Andreas Giebel in 1855, as a carnivoran subfamily that included Arctocyon, the amphicyonid Amphicyon, and the ursid Agriotherium. It was elevated to family level by Scottish zoologist Andrew Murray. At some point thereafter, arctocyonids became a family within Creodonta. In 1975, Malcolm McKenna erected a new order, Arctocyonia, to accommodate them, placing them within Ungulata. Since then, Arctocyonidae has largely been treated as a family of its own, though how that family is divided has been another matter. William Diller Matthew, in 1937, divided it into four subfamilies (Arctocyoninae, Chriacinae, Oxyclaeninae, and Triisodontinae); the latter is now regarded as a family of its own. That same year, George Gaylord Simpson suggested that arctocyonids could instead be divided into Arctocyoninae, Oxyclaeninae, and Triisodontinae. In 1978, Leigh Van Valen erected a new subfamily, Loxolophinae.

The relationship between arctocyonids and other clades has long been uncertain. Since becoming the sole representatives of their own order, they have been suggested to be either ancestral to artiodactyls or close to the clade's stem. The family's monophyly has also been called into question. In 2012, a phylogenetic analysis of Prolatidens waudrae, a traditional arctocyonid, recovered it as a more basal ungulate; Arctocyon, Landenodon and Thryptacodon were recovered as part of a clade sister to triisodonts and mesonychids; and the remainder of tested arctocyonids formed a polytomy basal to that clade and Diacodexis. In 2015, Peter E. Kondrashov and Spencer G. Lucas recovered the family as an artificial assemblage of basal ungulates. That same year, a larger analysis by Thomas J. D. Halliday, Paul Upchurch and Anjali Goswami recovered arctocyonids as several entirely unrelated placental lineages. By their unconstrained strict consensus tree, Arctocyon is related to Periptychus and Protolitopterna, Loxolophinae is related to pantolestids and pangolins. By their constrained strict consensus tree, Arctocyon and Loxolophus form a clade related to pantodonts and periptychids, and the rest of Arctocyonidae is recovered close to pangolins.

== Description ==
Arctocyonidae, if monophyletic, was a morphologically disparate lineage. Some genera, such as Chriacus, were fairly small, and bore adaptations for an arboreal or scansorial lifestyle. Others, like Anacodon, were very large and robust, having adaptations for both arboreal and fossorial lifestyles. Arctocyon, particularly Arctocyon mumak, appears to have been the most terrestrial, though likely descended from arboreal ancestors. Most arctocyonids are fragmentary, making it difficult to determine body size. Chriacus likely weighed 5–10 kg (11–22 lb), and was slightly larger than a modern coati. Arctocyon primaevus may have weighed up to 44 kg (97 lb), and had an estimated shoulder height of 45 cm (18 in). Remains of Mentoclaenodon suggest a very large body size, though exactly how large it grew is unclear, although it was outsized by Arctocyon mumak.

=== Skulls and dentition ===
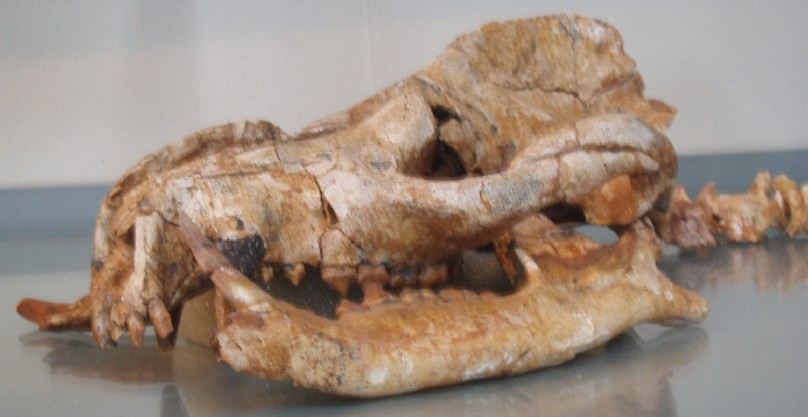
Arctocyon primaevus skull

The skulls of arctocyonids were fairly long, with a small braincase and very large sagittal and occipital crests, combined traits of herbivorous and carnivorous mammals. The zygomatic arch of Arctocyon specifically was very large, with a posterior angle anterior to the mandibular fossa, almost forming a right angle. In most genera, the incisors were small and unspecialised, though others, like Thryptacodon, had modified them into grooming teeth convergent with those of lemurs. Though the canines likely had a role in feeding in certain genera, in others, like Anacodon, they did not. In the case of Arctocyon, the lower canines were longest, to the extent that they were accommodated by a gap (or diastema) between the upper canines and premolars. The cheek teeth were tricuspid (three-cusped) and were often bunodont. The premolars were simple, if fairly sharp, while the molars were blunt and resembled those of bears. Overall, the dental morphology of arctocyonids suggests that they were omnivorous to varying degrees.

=== Postcranial elements ===
In Arctocyon, the mammillary processes of the dorsal vertebrae were robust (suggesting powerful musculature), and the caudal vertebrae appear to have been tightly interlocked, suggesting that the tail was fairly rigid. In Chriacus, however, there are signs that the tail may have been prehensile. Arctocyonid limbs were fairly typical in length, with stout ulnar and fibular shafts. In Anacodon, particularly, the limbs were very robust. In Chriacus, the ankle joints were flexible and allowed the hind feet to rotate, enabling them to climb downward. Anacodon's ankles had very little lateral movement. Five digits were present on all limbs. The phalanges were narrow and long, though the innermost and outermost digits were slightly reduced. In the case of Chriacus, the innermost digit (the hallux) was divergent. On all digits, the unguals were laterally compressed and quite clawlike. In some genera, like Anacodon, they may have been used for digging.

== Biology ==
=== Diet and feeding ===
Arctocyonid cheek teeth were bunodont, and the carniassials seen in other predatory mammal clades were essentially absent. Overall, the dental morphology of arctocyonids suggests that they were omnivorous, to varying degrees. Anacodon may have been among the least carnivorous, having flat, crenulated cheek teeth while Arctocyon corrugatus was among the most carnivorous.

== See also ==
- Mesonychidae
