= Christine Janis =

British–American palaeontologist

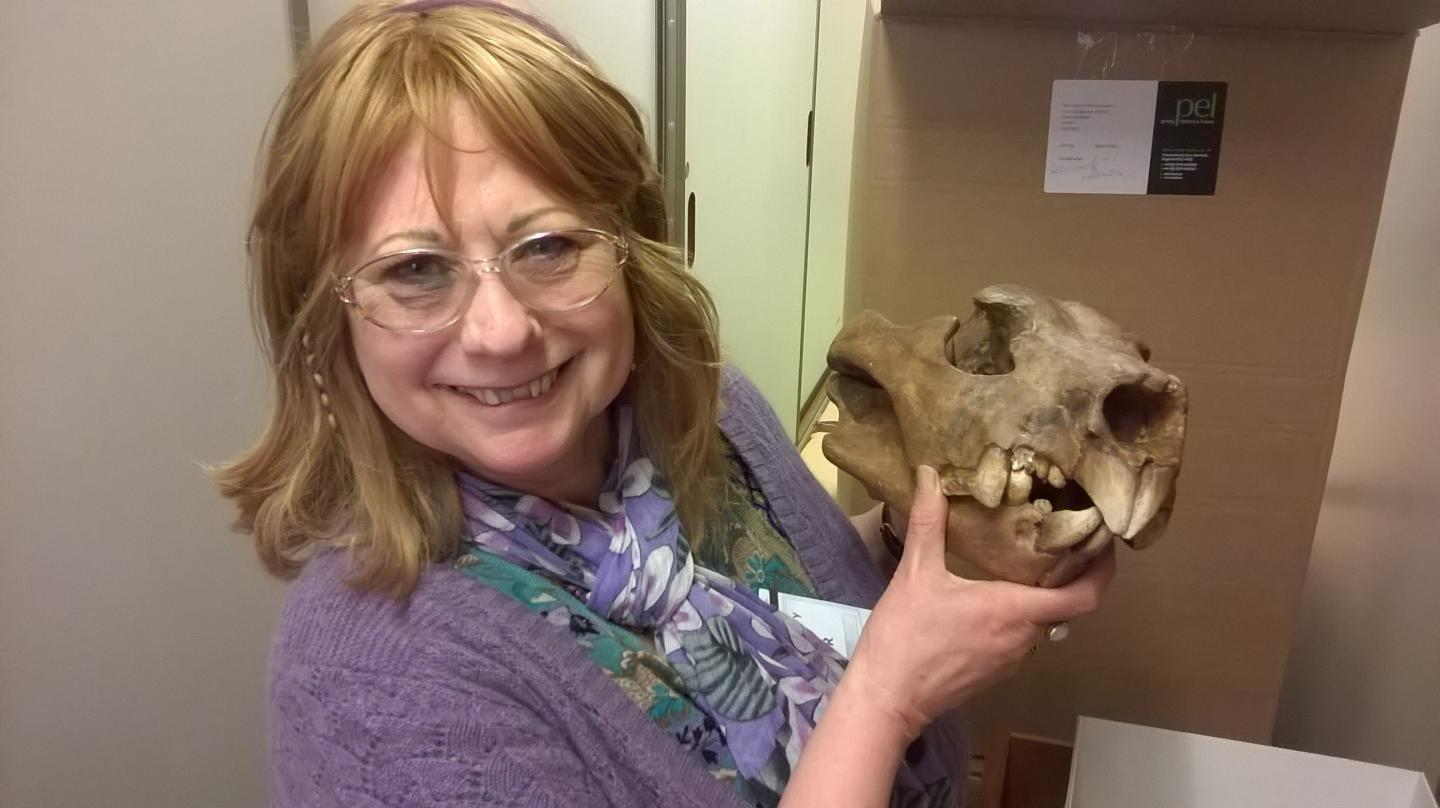
- Janis with a cast of the skull of the "marsupial lion" Thylacoleo carnifex, Natural History Museum, London (photograph by Elsa Panciroli)
- Born: Christine Marie Janis
- Education: University of Cambridge (1973); Harvard University (1979)
- Known for: Mammalian evolution; ungulate dentition; hypsodonty index; mammalian locomotion
- Awards: George Gaylord Simpson Prize (1985); Romer-Simpson Medal (2024); Fellow of the American Academy of Arts and Sciences (2025)
- Scientific career
- Fields: Palaeontology, Vertebrate palaeontology, Evolutionary biology
- Workplaces: Brown University; University of Bristol

Christine Marie Janis is a British–American palaeontologist whose work focuses on mammalian evolution. She is Professor Emerita of Biology at Brown University and Honorary Professor in the School of Earth Sciences at the University of Bristol. Her research examines the evolution of mammalian diet and locomotion, particularly in relation to climatic and environmental change during the Cenozoic.

Janis's research has addressed mammalian herbivory, limb biomechanics, and locomotor evolution, with a focus on ungulates, carnivorans, and macropodoid marsupials (kangaroos). She has received several professional honors, including the George Gaylord Simpson Prize and the Romer-Simpson Medal. She is an elected Fellow of the American Academy of Arts and Sciences.

== Early life and education ==
Janis earned a bachelor's degree in Natural Sciences (Zoology) from the University of Cambridge in 1973, and a PhD in Organismal Biology (Vertebrate Paleontology) from Harvard University in 1979.

== Academic career ==
Janis joined Brown University in 1983, where she served as assistant professor, associate professor, and professor of biology until her retirement in 2016, when she was appointed Professor Emerita.

She was a visiting professor at the University of Chicago from 1994 to 1996, and held Benjamin Meaker Fellowships at the University of Bristol in 2001 and 2008. Since 2015 she has been Honorary Professor in the School of Earth Sciences at the University of Bristol. She has also served as an honorary research associate at the Field Museum of Natural History in Chicago.

Since 2019, Janis has been a member of the advisory board of the NOW (New and Old Worlds) Database of Fossil Mammals, a global resource for documenting Cenozoic mammalian occurrences and supporting macroevolutionary and palaeoecological research.

== Scientific contributions ==
Janis's research examines the evolution of Cenozoic mammals, with particular attention to relationships between morphology, behaviour, and environmental change. Her work integrates fossil evidence with functional and biomechanical analyses to reconstruct diet, locomotion, and ecological adaptation in both living and extinct mammals. Much of her research focuses on ungulates, carnivorans, and macropodoid marsupials (kangaroos).

Janis's first publication addressed competition between horses and ruminant artiodactyls, a topic she continued to investigate later in her career and revisited in recent work on the drivers of late Cenozoic equid evolution.

She has contributed to research on mammalian herbivory through analyses of dental morphology and wear, particularly in relation to the evolution of hypsodont (high-crowned) cheek teeth. This work includes quantitative studies of dental traits in living ungulates and examinations of the relationships between tooth form, feeding ecology, palaeoenvironmental reconstruction, and adaptive responses to increasingly abrasive diets. Janis has also conducted research on ruminant artiodactyl systematics and on patterns of Cenozoic mammalian evolution in relation to climate change. Her work has contributed to broader analyses of how long-term environmental change is associated with mammalian diversity and ecological specialisation.

From the 1990s onward, Janis published extensively on mammalian locomotion and limb biomechanics, demonstrating how limb proportions, joint morphology, and scaling relationships can be used to infer locomotor behaviour in extinct mammals. This research has provided a functional framework for interpreting postcranial fossil material across a range of mammalian groups.

Her publications also include studies of the predatory behaviour of marsupial carnivores, incorporating biomechanical and functional analyses that have been reported in popular science media.

In more recent research, Janis has examined the evolution of horse locomotion, particularly hypotheses concerning the evolution of a single functional toe in modern horses. She has also contributed to research on kangaroo locomotion, proposing that extinct short-faced giant kangaroos (sthenurines) used bipedal walking rather than hopping. This interpretation was later supported by fossil trackway evidence. Beyond mammals, Janis has published on the palaeobiology of other fossil vertebrates, including early vertebrates, early tetrapods, dinosaurs, Mesozoic mammals, and the timing of divergence among placental mammal lineages.

== Honors and awards ==
- George Gaylord Simpson Prize, Yale University (1985)
- Fellow, The Paleontological Society (2007)
- Elizabeth Leduc Award, Brown University (2008)
- Honorary Member, Society of Vertebrate Paleontology (2019)
- Elected member, Linnean Society of London (2022)
- Romer-Simpson Medal, Society of Vertebrate Paleontology (2024)
- Elected member, American Academy of Arts and Sciences (2025)

== Books ==
Janis has authored and edited several widely used textbooks and edited volumes on vertebrate evolution and mammalian palaeontology. These include seven editions of Vertebrate Life (1998–2023), with Harvey Pough as senior author, and two volumes of the reference work Evolution of Tertiary Mammals of North America (1998, 2008), for which she served as senior editor.

== Selected publications ==
- Janis, C. M. (1976). "The evolutionary strategy of the Equidae and the origins of rumen and cecal digestion". Evolution. 30 (4): 757–774. 1976. doi:10.2307/2407816.
- Janis, Christine (1982). "Evolution of Horns in Ungulates: Ecology and Paleoecology". Biological Reviews. 57 (2): 261–318. doi:10.1111/j.1469-185X.1982.tb00370.x. (awarded the George Gaylord Simpson Prize)
- Janis, C. M.; Fortelius, M. (1988). "On the means whereby mammals achieve increased functional durability of their dentitions, with special reference to limiting factors". Biological Reviews. 63 (2): 197–230. 1988. doi:10.1111/j.1469-185X.1988.tb00630.x.
- Garland, T. Jr.; Dickerman, A. W.; Janis, C. M.; Jones, J. A. (1993). "Phylogenetic analysis of covariance by computer simulation". Systematic Biology. 42 (3): 265–292. 1993. doi:10.1093/sysbio/42.3.265.
- Janis, C. M. (1993). "Tertiary mammal evolution in the context of changing climates, vegetation, and tectonic events". Annual Review of Ecology and Systematics. 24: 467–500. 1993. doi:10.1146/annurev.es.24.110193.002343.
- Pough, F. H.; Janis, C. M.; Heiser, J. B. (1999). Vertebrate Life. Prentice Hall. 1999. ISBN 978-0-13-127836-3.
- Foote, M.; Hunter, J. P.; Janis, C. M.; Sepkoski, J. J. Jr. (1999). "Evolutionary and preservational constraints on origins of biologic groups: Divergence times of eutherian mammals". Science. 283 (5406): 1310–1314. 1999. doi:10.1126/science.283.5406.1310.
- Janis, C. M.; Damuth, J.; Theodor, J. M. (2002). "Miocene ungulates and terrestrial primary productivity: Where have all the browsers gone?". Proceedings of the National Academy of Sciences. 99 (14): 7899–7904. 2002. doi:10.1073/pnas.97.14.7899. PMC 16642.
- Damuth, J.; Janis, C. M. (2011). "On the relationship between hypsodonty and feeding ecology in ungulate mammals, and its utility in palaeoecology". Biological Reviews. 86 (3): 733–758. 2011. doi:10.1111/j.1469-185X.2011.00176.x.

== Personal life ==
In addition to her research on fossil horses, Janis has been a life-long equestrian. She was married to palaeontologist Jack Sepkoski (1948–1999).

== Public engagement ==
Janis has contributed to public understanding of science through radio and television appearances, including participation in BBC Radio 4's In Our Time. She served as a scientific advisor for the Netflix documentary series Life on Our Planet (2023), and has provided extensive advisory input for a forthcoming BBC television series on evolution.
