= Armintomys =

Armintomys Temporal range: 50.3–46.2 Ma

Scientific classification
- Kingdom: Animalia
- Phylum: Chordata
- Class: Mammalia
- Order: Rodentia
- Suborder: Myomorpha
- Family: †Armintomyidae; Dawson, Krishtalka, & Stucky, 1990
- Genus: †Armintomys; Dawson, Krishtalka, & Stucky, 1990
- Species: †A. tullbergi

Binomial name
- †Armintomys tullbergi Dawson, Krishtalka, & Stucky, 1990

Extinct genus of rodents

Armintomys is an extinct genus of rodent from North America related to jerboas and jumping mice. It is the only genus in the family Armintomyidae. It lived during the early Eocene, and is the oldest known example of a hystricomorphous skull. In addition, Armintomys is also the oldest known rodent that had an incisor enamel transition from pauciserial to uniserial. Its remains have only been found in the Wind River Basin in Wyoming. It was previously assumed that Armintomys belonged to the Dipodoidea family, but has since been understood to have been part of an early radiation of dipodoid rodents, but was not directly ancestral to any later dipodoids, thus it was recategorized into its own family.
