= William A. Clemens Jr. =

American paleontologist and academic (1932–2020)

William Alvin Clemens, Jr.
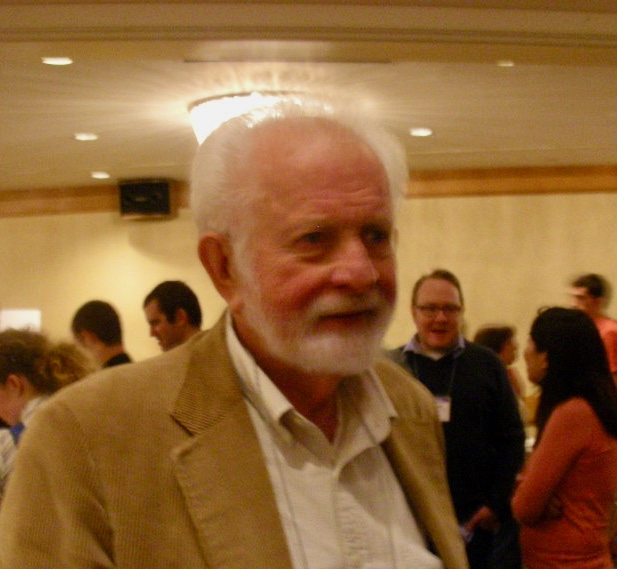
- Clemens in 2008
- Born: May 14, 1932; Berkeley, California
- Died: November 17, 2020 (aged 88); Berkeley, California
- Education: BA, PhD
- Alma mater: University of California, Berkeley
- Known for: Research on Mesozoic mammals, K-Pg extinction
- Awards: Guggenheim Fellowship 1974-1975; Humboldt Research Fellowship; Fellow, American Association for the Advancement of Science; Fellow, Geological Society of America; Fellow, Zoological Society of London; Fellow, Linnean Society of London; President, Society of Vertebrate Paleontology 1992-1994; Joseph T. Gregory Award, Society of Vertebrate Paleontology 2002; Romer-Simpson Medal 2006
- Scientific career
- Fields: Vertebrate Paleontology, Geology
- Institutions: University of California-Berkeley, University of Kansas-Lawrence
- Doctoral advisor: Donald E. Savage
- Website: senate.universityofcalifornia.edu/in-memoriam/files/william-clemens.html

William Alvin Clemens Jr. (May 15, 1932 — November 17, 2020) was a paleontologist at the University of California at Berkeley. He was faculty of the Department of Paleontology from 1967, then the Department of Integrative Biology from 1994 to his retirement and curator of the UC Museum of Paleontology. Clemens was also director of the museum (1987–1989) and chair of the Department of Paleontology (1987–1989). He was awarded a Guggenheim Fellowship (1974–75), a U.S. Senior Scientist Award by the Alexander von Humboldt Foundation, the Romer-Simpson Medal (2006), and was made a Fellow of the California Academy of Sciences.

== Early life and education ==
Clemens was born in Berkeley, California. After graduating from Berkeley High School, he attended the University of California, Berkeley, earning a B.A. in paleontology in 1954 and a Ph.D. in 1960. From 1961 to 1967, he served as faculty in the Zoology Department at the University of Kansas and as the curator of higher vertebrates in their Museum of Natural History.

== Research ==
Clemens' research focussed on the evolution of mammals in the Mesozoic Era, both their origin and diversification as well as the microstructure of the early mammalian jaw and teeth. He was also noted for his research into the extinction of the dinosaurs at the Cretaceous–Paleogene boundary (K–Pg or K-T boundary). Clemens supported a view contrary to the more familiar Alvarez hypothesis model of sudden catastrophic extinction precipitated by an asteroid, which was proposed in part by Walter Alvarez, also at the University of California, Berkeley, at the time. Clemens' research in western North America suggests that the dinosaurs were already undergoing gradual extinction prior to the end of the Cretaceous and that other groups of vertebrates were not severely impacted by the event.

== Selected publications ==
- Clemens, William A. (1997). "Characterization of enamel microstructure and application of the origins of prismatic structures in systematic analyses", pages 85–112 in W. V. Koenigswald (ed.) Tooth enamel microstructure. Rotterdam: A. A. Balkema.
- Clemens, William A. (2001). "Patterns of mammalian evolution across the Cretaceous-Tertiary boundary". Mitteilungen aus dem Museum für Naturkunde in Berlin, Zoologische Reihe 77:175–191.
- Clemens, William A. (2002). "Evolution of the mammalian fauna across the Cretaceous-Tertiary boundary in northeastern Montana and other areas of the Western Interior." Geological Society of America, Special Paper 361: 217–245.
- Clemens, William A. (2006). Ecological diversification of mammals during the Mesozoic, the Age of Dinosaurs. McGraw-Hill.
