= Jiří Zídek =

Jiří Zídek or Jiri Zidek may refer to:

- Jiří Zídek Sr. (1944–2022), Czech basketball player and coach
- Jiri Zidek (paleontologist) (20th century), Czech-American paleontologist and entomologist
- George Zidek or Jiří Zídek Jr. (born 1973), Czech basketball player and commentator
