= Michael Skrepnick =

Palaeoartist and illustrator

Michael W. Skrepnick
- Years active: 2001–present
- Known for: Paleoart
- Website: www.dinosaursinart.com

Michael W. Skrepnick is a Canadian palaeoartist best known for his illustrations of prehistoric animals. He has produced illustrations featured in natural history museums, scientific journals, books and magazines. He lives and works in Alberta, Canada. Skrepnick is noted for his acrylic paintings of dinosaurs, such as his rendition of the 2016 discovery of the ceratopsian dinosaur genus Spiclypeus.

Skrepnick's dinosaur art is recognized for its masterful use of color and imagination, particularly in environmental composition. Some of his most important contributions include cover illustrations for books like the Encyclopedia of Dinosaurs and The Dinosauria. He was a long and close friend of John Lanzendorf, whose famous paleoart collection contained many of Skrepnick's original paintings. He was awarded the Society of Vertebrate Paleontology's Lanzendorf PaleoArt Prize in 2001.
