= Zídek =

Zídek (feminine: Zídková) is a Czech surname. Notable people with the surname include:

- George Zidek (born Jiří Zídek Jr.; 1973), Czech basketball player
- Jan Zídek (born 1999), Czech basketball player
- Jiří Zídek Sr. (1944–2022), Czech basketball player
- Jiri Zidek (paleontologist) (born Jiří Zídek), Czech-born American paleontologist

== See also ==
- Anna Carin Zidek (born 1973), Swedish biathlete
- Žídek/Židek, similar surname
