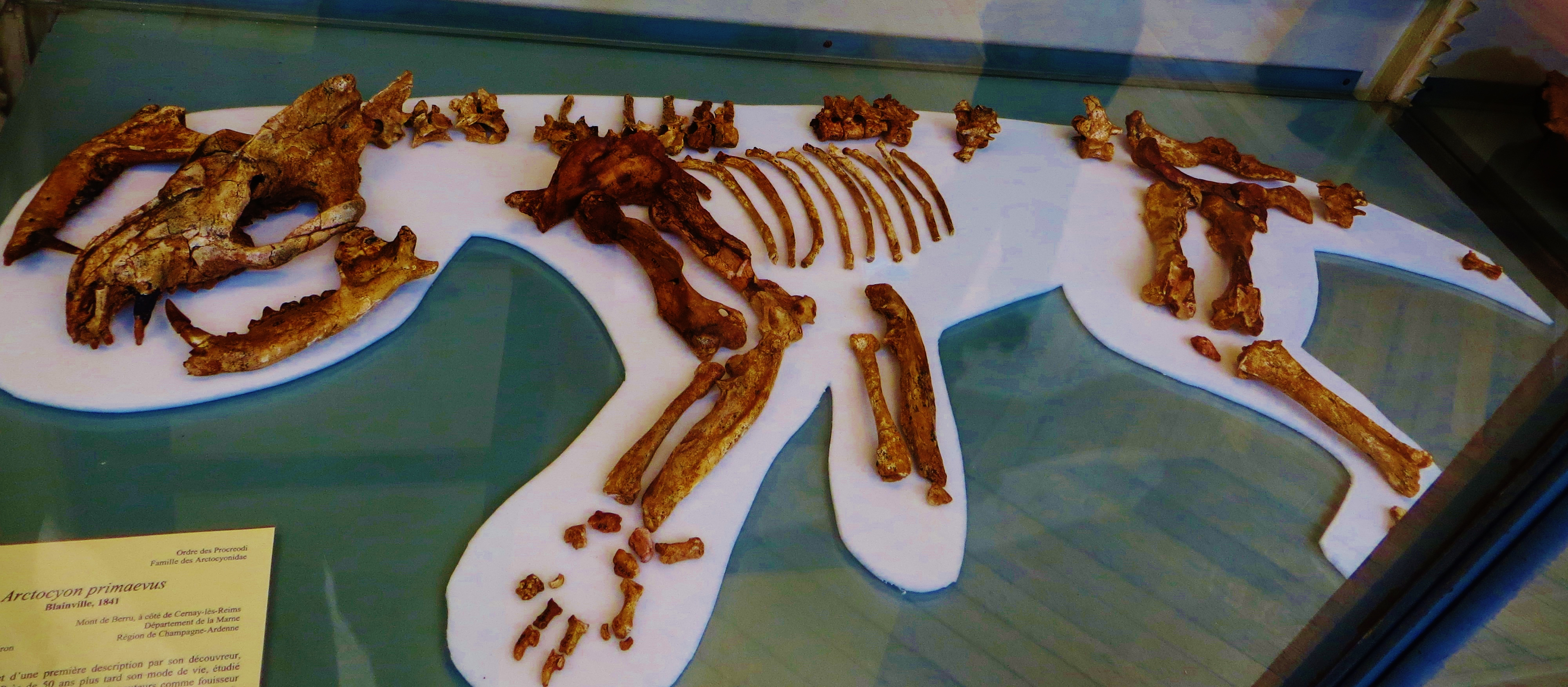
- Skeleton of A. primaevus
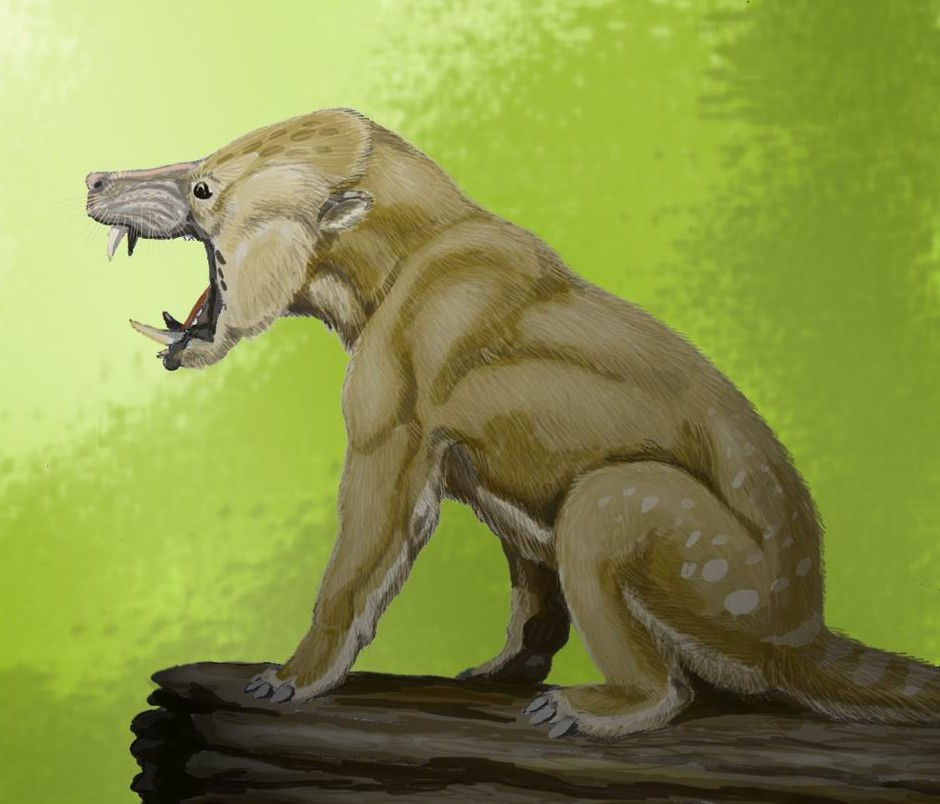
- Life reconstruction of Arctocyon

Scientific classification
- Kingdom: Animalia
- Phylum: Chordata
- Class: Mammalia
- Order: †Arctocyonia
- Family: †Arctocyonidae
- Subfamily: †Arctocyoninae
- Genus: †Arctocyon; Blainville, 1841

Type species
- †Arctocyon primaevus

Species
- †A. acrogenius Gazin, 1956; †A. corrugatus Cope, 1883; †A. ferox Cope, 1883; †A. matthesi Russell, 1964; †A.? nexus Gazin, 1956

Synonyms
- †Claenodon Scott, 1892

= Arctocyon =

Arctocyon Temporal range: Early Paleocene-Late Paleocene 61.3–56.8 Ma

Extinct genus of mammals

Arctocyon (from Ancient Greek ἄρκτος (árktos), meaning "bear", and κύων (kúon), meaning "dog", and thus, "bear-dog") is an extinct genus of large placental mammals, part of the possibly polyphyletic family Arctocyonidae. The type species is A. primaevus, though up to five other species may be known. Fossils of Arctocyon have been found in Europe and North America. Arctocyon was originally named as a subgenus of the bear-dog Amphicyon, though was subsequently found to belong to a genus and family of its own. The relationship between arctocyonids and other placentals is unclear, with early classification efforts placing them as carnivores or creodonts, and later ones classifying them under Condylarthra, a wastebasket taxon for various early ungulates. More recent phylogenetic analyses suggest that arctocyonids are an artificial assemblage of several distantly-related placental lineages, and Arctocyon may be closely related to Loxolophus (another arctocyonid) and to pantodonts.

Arctocyon was the largest arctocyonid. A. primaevus measured 45 cm (18 in) at the shoulder, and weighed up to 44 kg (97 lb), with A. mumak reaching larger sizes. Like many other arctocyonids, Arctocyon had very large canine teeth. In the case of the lower canines, they were large enough that they had to be accommodated by a gap between the upper canines and the premolars. The occipital and sagittal crests were very large. The cheek teeth were fairly unspecialised, and resembled those of bears. Arctocyon's torso was rigid and well-muscled, and the tail was quite inflexible. The forelimbs were powerfully muscled, the claws were curved and laterally compressed, and the digits had a strong grasping ability, suggesting that at least some species, like A. primaevus, were capable of climbing. Other species, such as A. mumak, were more terrestrial, and may have occasionally burrowed.

== Taxonomy ==
=== Early history ===
The earliest fossils of Arctocyon were found in the area around La Fère, France, by M. Fremanger. It was first described by Henri Marie Ducrotay de Blainville in 1841, on the basis of well-preserved fossil remains from the upper Paleocene sediments of France. Initially, it was assigned to Amphicyon as a subgenus, alternatively called Palaeocyon. In 1855, Christoph Gottfried Andreas Giebel elevated the latter name to genus level, and erected the subfamily Arctocyoninae to incorporate it, including Arctocyon, along with Agriotherium and Amphicyon. In 1866, Arctocyonidae was elevated to family level by Scottish zoologist Andrew Murray, who further included Tylodon. In 1892, William Berryman Scott named another arctocyonid, Claenodon, which was subsequently synonymised with Arctocyon proper.

=== Taxonomy ===
Though initially classified within Carnivora, Arctocyonidae subsequently fell under the wastebasket taxon Creodonta. Subsequently, it fell under Condylarthra, a polyphyletic assemblage of basal ungulates. Arctocyonidae saw multiple taxonomic revisions over the coming decades, with anywhere from two to four subfamilies being recognised at a given time.The relationship between arctocyonids and other clades has long been uncertain. Since becoming the sole representatives of their own order, they have been suggested to be either ancestral to artiodactyls or close to the clade's stem.

The family's monophyly has also been called into question. In 2012, a phylogenetic analysis of Prolatidens waudrae, a traditional arctocyonid, recovered it as a more basal ungulate; Arctocyon, Landenodon and Thryptacodon were recovered as part of a clade sister to triisodonts and mesonychids; and the remainder of tested arctocyonids formed a polytomy basal to that clade and Diacodexis. In 2015, Peter E. Kondrashov and Spencer G. Lucas recovered the family as an artificial assemblage of basal ungulates. That same year, a larger analysis by Thomas J. D. Halliday, Paul Upchurch and Anjali Goswami recovered arctocyonids as several entirely unrelated placental lineages. By their unconstrained strict consensus tree, Arctocyon is related to Periptychus and Protolitopterna, Loxolophinae is related to pantolestids and pangolins. By their constrained strict consensus tree, Arctocyon and Loxolophus form a clade related to pantodonts and periptychids, and the rest of Arctocyonidae is recovered close to pangolins.

=== Internal systematics ===
The type species of Arctocyon is A. primaevus, initially named by de Blainville in 1839 for remains recovered from France. Two additional species of Arctocyon, A. corrugatus and A. ferox, were named by Edward Drinker Cope in 1883, both from the Eocene of North America. Both were initially assigned to Mioclaenodon, and subsequently Oxyclaenus. A fourth species, A. mumak, was named by Leigh Van Valen in 1978 and initially assigned to Arctocyonoides. Its name derives from mûmakil, a Haradrim name for oliphaunts (large, elephant-like creatures) in the works of J. R. R. Tolkien. Initially known from only a lower jaw, recovered from Palaeocene strata of North America, A. mumak is now known from a partial skeleton. A. mumak has occasionally been regarded as a junior synonym of A. acrogenius, named in 1956 by Charles Lewis Gazin. Anacodon nexus, also named by Gazin, has been tentatively assigned to Arctocyon. Another possible species, A. matthesi, has been described from Germany.

== Description ==
Arctocyon, particularly A. mumak, appears to have been among the most terrestrial arctocyonids, though likely descended from arboreal ancestors. A. primaevus may have weighed up to 44 kg (97 lb), and had an estimated shoulder height of 45 cm (18 in). The biggest species, as well as the biggest arctocyonid overall, was A. mumak.

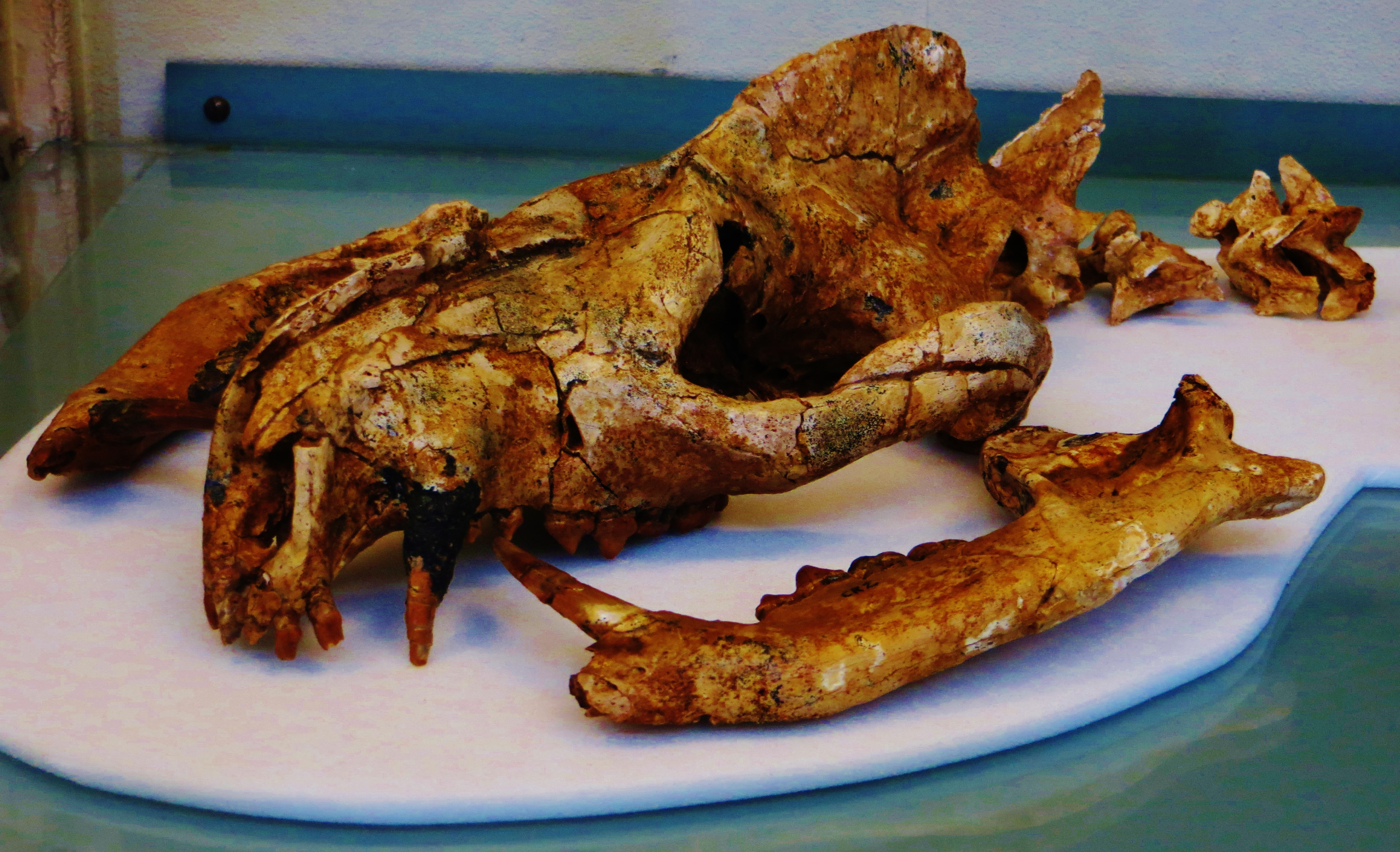
Skull and jaw of A. primaevus

=== Skull and dentition ===
Arctocyon's skull was fairly long, with a small braincase and very large sagittal and occipital crests. The zygomatic arch was very wide, with a posterior angle anterior to the mandibular fossa, almost forming a right angle. Like in most arctocyonid genera, the incisors were small and unspecialised. Though both sets of canines were very large, the lower set was longest, to the extent that they had to be accommodated by a gap (or diastema) between the upper set and the premolars. Like in other arctocyonids, the cheek teeth were tricuspid (three-cusped) and were often bunodont. The carnassial tooth morphology seen in other predatory mammal lineages was absent. The premolars were simple, if fairly sharp, while the molars were blunt and resembled those of bears.

=== Postcranial skeleton ===
In Arctocyon, the mammillary processes of the dorsal vertebrae were robust, suggesting powerful musculature. The posterior thoracic vertebrae were characterised by revolute zygapophyses, suggesting a strong degree of rigidity. The caudal vertebrae appear to have been tightly interlocked, suggesting that the tail, too, was fairly rigid. Like in other arctocyonids, the limbs were fairly typical in length, with stout ulnar and fibular shafts. Five digits were present on all limbs. The phalanges were narrow and long, though the innermost and outermost digits were slightly reduced. The joints of the digits were highly mobile, and the flexor muscles were developed, suggesting a strong grasping ability. On all digits, the unguals were laterally compressed and quite clawlike. Arctocyon was plantigrade, meaning that it walked with its feet flat on the ground like a modern bear. A. mumak had a well-developed furrow under the sustentaculum tali (a horizontal shelf on the calcaneus) and a great plantar tubercle on the navicular, suggesting a higher degree of terrestriality than in other species.

== Paleoecology ==
Arctocyon probably had an omnivorous diet: the molariform teeth indicate that Arctocyon's teeth could grind plant material, but the incisors, and in particular, the large canines, indicate the ability to feed on meat. The postcranial skeleton also suggests a mixed diet, even if the morphology is not found in any modern mammal. A. corrugatus appears to have been the most carnivorous species. The overall morphology of Arctocyon has a combination of arboreal and fossorial traits, suggesting that at least some species, i.e. A. primaevus, were at least somewhat arboreal in habits. Others, like the larger A. mumak, were more terrestrial, and may have been burrowers or even fossorial.

One study indicated that A. primaevus, morphologically, was more similar to some extinct South American metatherians, such as sparassodonts, than to any other mammal. The general size and proportions are a mix between Borhyaena and Prothylacinus, while some characteristics (the development of ridges and processes on the humerus) made it similar to Prothylacinus. In general, it appears that Arctocyon and its close relatives, with their tusk-like canines and molariform teeth indicating an omnivorous diet, and a skeleton more like that of carnivores than that of ungulates, represented a very unusual mosaic of features, and thus their paleobiology and paleoecology are therefore very difficult to establish.
