= Anacodon =

Anacodon Temporal range: Eocene

Scientific classification
- Kingdom: Animalia
- Phylum: Chordata
- Class: Mammalia
- Infraclass: Placentalia
- Order: †Arctocyonia
- Family: †Arctocyonidae
- Genus: †Anacodon; Cope, 1882

Type species
- †Anacodon ursidens Cope, 1882

Species
- †Anacodon cultridens Granger & Matthew, 1956; †Anacodon? nexus Gazin, 1956

Extinct genus of mammal

Anacodon is a genus of arctocyonid from the Eocene of North America. It is known from the type species, A. ursidens, a second species, A. cultridens, and a possible third, A. nexus. Initially believed to be a relative of Phenacodon, it was subsequently found to be an arctocyonid, possibly related to Claenodon. Anacodon was extremely robust compared to other members of its family, and may have been capable of climbing and digging like modern bears.

== Taxonomy ==
=== Early history ===
The first specimens of Anacodon to be discovered were a pair of mandibular rami, apparently from different individuals. In 1882, they were described by Edward Drinker Cope. Cope assigned the new genus to Phenacodontidae. Ten years later, in 1892, Henry Fairfield Osborn and Jacob Lawson Wortman instead assigned it to the family Arctocyonidae. In 1915, a second species of Anacodon, A. cultridens, was named by Walter Granger and William Diller Matthew. In 1937, George Gaylord Simpson suggested that Anacodon may have represented a late-surviving member of an arctocyonid lineage deriving from Claenodon. A second mandible, considerably smaller than A. ursidens, was later recovered in the Buckman Hollow locality of Wyoming's Almy Formation, and in 1956, it was formally described by Charles Lewis Gazin. He tentatively assigned it to Anacodon, assigning to it the binomial name Anacodon? nexus, though noted that it may have been a species of Claenodon. In 2006, it was tentatively reassigned to Arctocyon. Postcranial remains of Anacodon have since been recovered from the Willwood Formation of Wyoming.

== Description ==
The holotype of Anacodon, consisting of two mandibular rami, preserves only the molars, with the exception of what may represent the fourth premolar on the more damaged mandible; the other premolars are not preserved. The overall morphology of the teeth resembles modern bears, being flatter and more crenulated than in other arctocyonids. Anacodon may have been trending away from carnivory and towards a more herbivorous diet. Anacodon is unusually robust by arctocyonid standards, to the point where the remains of its postcranial skeleton were initially mistaken for those of a taeniodont. In many respects, it resembles a larger version of the related Chriacus. The forelimbs were extremely robust, more so than the hind limbs, with curved ungual phalanges. A small spur on the tibia interlocked with the astragalus, restricting mediolateral (side-to-side) movement of the foot. The calcaneus of the foot is unusual in that it is strongly arched, a morphology otherwise only seen in certain hominids, ursids, and the giant anteater. Its overall morphology suggests that it may have been analogous to bears, being partly arboreal and fossorial.
