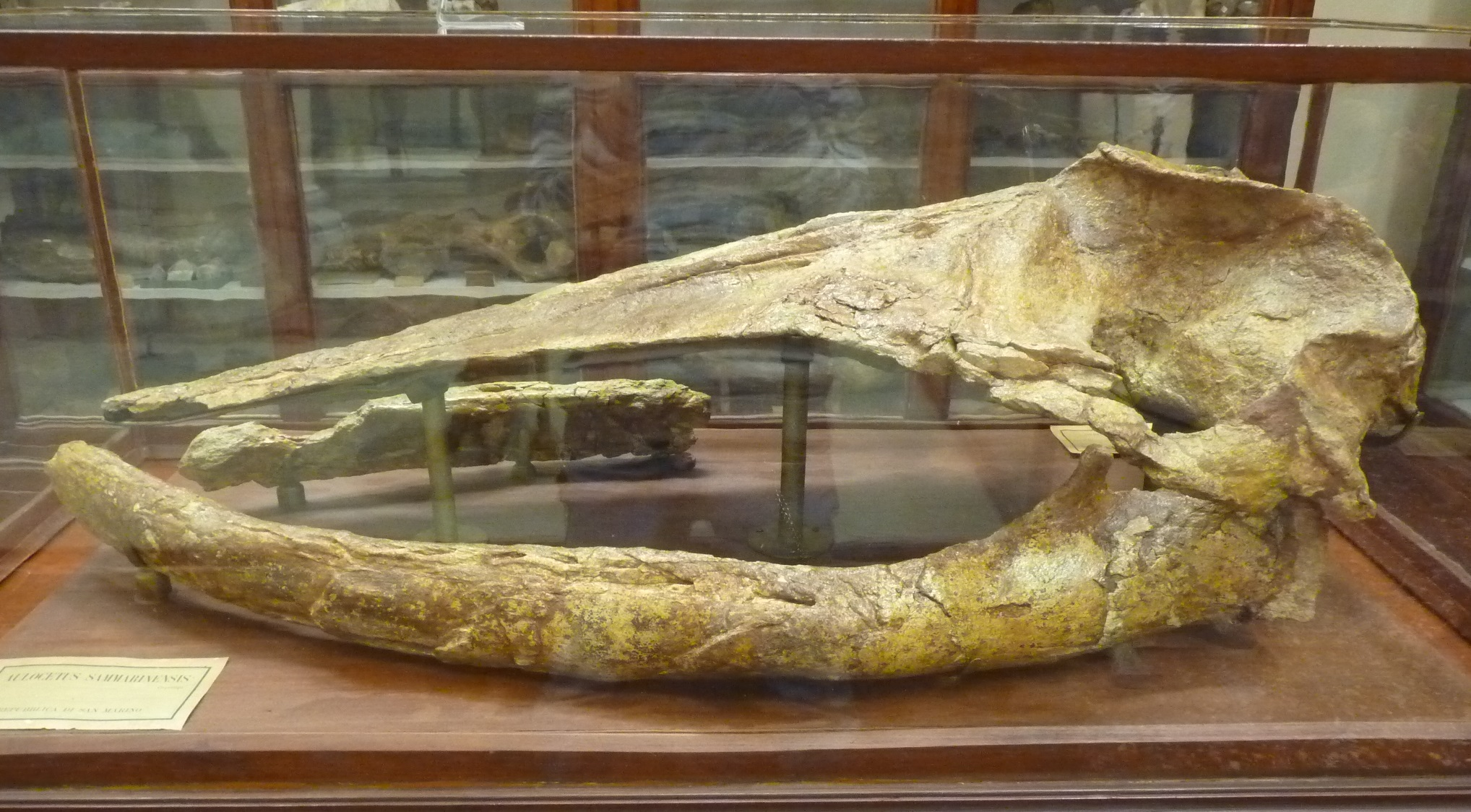
- Skull of Titanocetus sammarinensis (holotype) in Bologna, Italy

Scientific classification
- Kingdom: Animalia
- Phylum: Chordata
- Class: Mammalia
- Infraclass: Placentalia
- Order: Artiodactyla
- Infraorder: Cetacea
- Parvorder: Mysticeti
- Family: Cetotheriidae (?)
- Genus: †Titanocetus (Bisconti 2006)

Species
- †T. sammarinensis Capellini 1901

= Titanocetus =

Titanocetus Temporal range: Serravallian

Extinct genus of mammals

Titanocetus ("Titano whale") is a genus of extinct cetaceans closely related to the family Cetotheriidae.

== Discovery ==
The fossil remains of Titanocetus were discovered within some marine deposits dating back to the Serravallian (middle Miocene) and belonging to the Fumaiolo Formation (Republic of San Marino). The whale was then described in 1900 by the Italian paleontologist Giovanni Capellini, who later (1901) named it Aulocetus sammarinensis. Over a century later, in 2006, the paleontologist Michelangelo Bisconti stated that the remains was too different from the type species of the genus Aulocetus and thus established a new genus, Titanocetus.

== Description ==
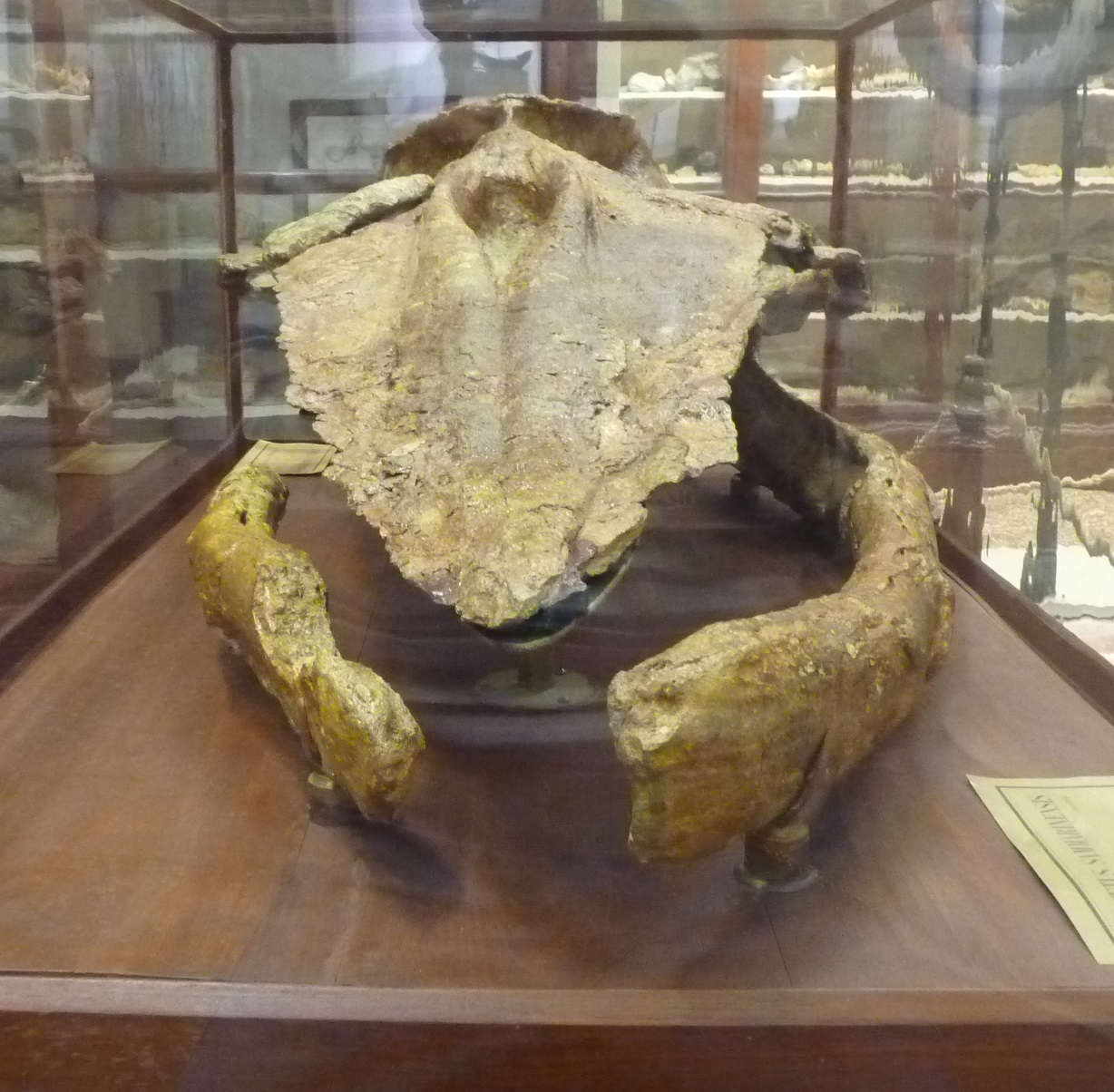
Front view of skull

This whale was similar in appearance to the living Balaenopteridae, although it was considerably smaller: the skull barely exceeded one meter in total length, while the entire animal reached around six meters.

Considered nowadays to be a primitive member of the Mysticeti, already equipped with baleen, Titanocetus was a carrier of both modern (i.e. the rostrum, wide and flat) and ancestral characters (i.e. the squamosal and parietal bones, which occupy part of the temporal fenestra).

== Bibliography ==
- Capellini, G. 1900. "Balenottera miocenica della Repubblica di San Marino". Atti della Reale Accademia dei Lincei 5:233-235.
- Capellini, G. 1901. "Balenottera miocenica del Monte Titano Repubblica di S. Marino". Memorie della Regia Accademia delle Scienze all'Istituto di Bologna 5:237-260.
- Bisconti, M. (2006). "Titanocetus, a new baleen whale from the Middle Miocene of northern Italy (Mammalia, Cetacea, Mysticeti)". Journal of Vertebrate Paleontology. 26 (2): 344–354.
