= Colbert Prize =

The Colbert Prize may refer to:

- A Society of Vertebrate Paleontology prize
- Prix de Rome
