= Romer-Simpson Medal =

Paleontology award

The Romer-Simpson Medal is the highest award issued by the Society of Vertebrate Paleontology for "sustained and outstanding scholarly excellence and service to the discipline of vertebrate paleontology". The award is named in honor of Alfred S. Romer and George G. Simpson.

== Past awards ==
Source: Society for Vertebrate Paleontology

- 1987 Everett C. Olson
- 1988 Bobb Schaeffer
- 1989 Edwin H. Colbert
- 1990 Richard Estes
- 1991 no award
- 1992 Loris S. Russell
- 1993 Zhou Mingzhen
- 1994 John H. Ostrom
- 1995 Zofia Kielan-Jaworowska
- 1996 Percy Butler
- 1997 Colin Patterson
- 1998 Albert E. Wood
- 1999 Robert Warren Wilson
- 2000 John A. Wilson
- 2001 Malcolm McKenna
- 2002 Mary R. Dawson
- 2003 Rainer Zangerl
- 2004 Robert L. Carroll
- 2005 Donald E. Russell
- 2006 William A. Clemens
- 2007 Wann Langston, Jr.
- 2008 Jose Bonaparte
- 2009 Farish Jenkins
- 2010 Rinchen Barsbold
- 2011 Alfred W. Crompton
- 2012 Philip D. Gingerich
- 2013 Jack Horner
- 2014 Hans-Peter Schultze
- 2015 Jim Hopson
- 2016 Mee-mann Chang
- 2017 Philip J. Currie
- 2018 Kay Behrensmeyer
- 2019 Michael Archer
- 2020 Jenny Clack
- 2021 Blaire Van Valkenburgh
- 2022 David W. Krause
- 2023 Mark Norell
- 2024 Christine Janis
- 2025 Michael Benton
- 2026 Bruce MacFadden

== See also ==
- List of biology awards
- List of paleontology awards
