= John Lanzendorf =

American hairstylist (born 1946)

John J. Lanzendorf (1946 – May 27, 2022) was an American hairstylist who amassed one of the world's largest collections of dinosaur-themed artwork. The collection is now owned by the Children's Museum of Indianapolis.

Lanzendorf grew up in Spooner, Wisconsin and attended cosmetology school. As an adult, he lived in the Gold Coast neighborhood of Chicago. During the 1970s and 1980s, he earned a reputation as one of the favorite hairstylists of Chicago's socialites, where his customers included celebrities such as Bette Midler, Jane Fonda, and Rita Hayworth. He worked with the fashion photographer Victor Skrebneski and had his own studio with partner Hank Blankenship on Chicago's Oak Street. A lover of animals, Lanzendorf kept Grand Basset Griffon Vendéen dogs as well as rare parrots, cockatoos and macaws.

Lanzendorf had begun collecting dinosaur-related items as a child, when he found a small plastic dinosaur toy in a cereal box. After recovering from cancer in the early 1990s, he started purchasing sculptures, paintings, and drawings from some of the best-known paleoartists, such as James Gurney, John Gurche, and Michael Skrepnick. He also acquired drawings from the University of Chicago paleontologist Paul Sereno, who became a close friend. By 2000, he owned about 500 pieces, which he kept in his one-bedroom apartment.

In 2000, Chicago's Field Museum of Natural History displayed about seventy of Lanzendorf's Tyrannosaurus sculptures and paintings to complement the grand opening of their Sue the Tyrannosaurus exhibit. That same year, a coffee table book about Lazendorf's collection, Dinosaur Imagery, was released by Academic Press. The book included a foreword by paleontologist Philip J. Currie and commentaries on the collection from other dinosaur researchers.

Lanzendorf sold his dinosaur collection to the Children's Museum of Indianapolis in 2001. He then redecorated his apartment with Asian art. Lanzendorf told an interviewer that he developed an interest in Asian artifacts after visiting fossil sites in Mongolia, and funded scholarships for dozens of young students in China after visiting there on a fossil expedition. His legacy continues to support dinosaur artists (and other science artists) with the Lanzendorf PaleoArt Prize (now called the Lanzendorf-National Geographic PaleoArt Prize), awarded through the Society of Vertebrate Paleontology.

After being diagnosed with pancreatic cancer, Lanzendorf died at 76 years old on May 27, 2022, due to complications from surgery at Northwestern Memorial Hospital.
