= Palaeontologia Electronica =

- Discipline: Paleontology
- Language: English
- Edited by: Julien Louys, Andrew Bush

Publication details
- History: 1998-present
- Publisher: Coquina Press
- Frequency: Triannually
- Open access: Yes
- Impact factor: 1.410 (2017)

Standard abbreviations
- ISO 4: Palaeontol. Electron.

Indexing
- ISSN: 1094-8074 (print); 1935-3952 (web)
- LCCN: 2007214070
- OCLC no.: 1048154389

Links
- Journal homepage; Online archive

Palaeontologia Electronica is a triannual peer-reviewed open-access scientific journal published by Coquina Press covering paleontology. It was established in 1998 and is the oldest fully open-access electronic journal of paleontology. The journal is sponsored by the Society of Vertebrate Paleontology, the Paleontological Society, the Palaeontological Association, and the Western Interior Paleontological Society. The editors-in-chief are Julien Louys (Griffith University) and Andrew Bush (University of Connecticut). In 2000, the first taxonomic names published electronically under new rules in the International Code of Zoological Nomenclature were published in the journal by Scott et al. for three new species of fossil foraminifera: Eggerella matsunoi, Haplophragmoides hatai, and Haplophragmoides nishikizawensis.

== Abstracting and indexing ==
The journal is abstracted and indexed in:

- Biological Abstracts
- BIOSIS Previews
- Current Contents/Physical, Chemical & Earth Sciences
- Science Citation Index Expanded
- Scopus
- Zoological Record

According to the Journal Citation Reports, the journal has a 2017 impact factor of 1.410.
