= Mary R. Dawson =

American paleontologist (1931–2020)

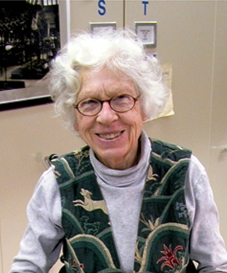
- Born: February 27, 1931; Highland Park, Michigan
- Died: November 29, 2020 (aged 89)
- Education: Michigan State University; University of Kansas
- Awards: Arnold Guyot Prize (1981); Romer-Simpson Medal (2002)
- Scientific career
- Fields: Vertebrate Paleontology, Biostratigraphy, Evolution
- Workplaces: Carnegie Museum of Natural History (retired)
- Thesis: (1957)
- Doctoral advisor: Robert W. Wilson

Mary R. Dawson (February 27, 1931 – November 29, 2020) was a vertebrate paleontologist and curator emeritus at the Carnegie Museum of Natural History in Pittsburgh, Pennsylvania.

== Education and career ==
Dawson was raised in Michigan, received her undergraduate degree from Michigan State University, and received her Ph.D. from the University of Kansas. She was Curator of Vertebrate Paleontology at the Carnegie Museum of Natural History in Pittsburgh from 1972 until she retired in 2003, including serving as chair of the Earth Sciences Division from 1973 to 1997.

== Research ==
Dawson's research has focused on the evolution of mammals, especially of Cenozoic rodents and lagomorphs. She has also maintained an active research program at Ellesmere Island and other sites in the high Arctic which showed that tropical and subtropical animals lived inside the Arctic Circle during the exceptionally warm climates of the Paleogene geological period. Through this work, she and her collaborators discovered the first fossils of Tertiary land animals that documented a migration route between North America and Europe. This migration route provided early support for the theory of plate tectonics, which was only gaining wide acceptance in the 1960s and 1970s. In 2006 she disputed the classification of the Laotian rock rat, arguing that it is a member of the family Diatomyidae, which had previously been believed to have gone extinct 11 million years ago.

== Awards and honors ==
In 1992 Dr. Dawson became the first American woman to receive the Romer-Simpson medal, which is awarded for lifetime achievement in the field of vertebrate paleontology and considered the highest honor bestowed by the Society of Vertebrate Paleontology. Likewise she was only the second woman to serve as the society's president in 1973–1974. The Society of Vertebrate Paleontology's Mary R. Dawson Predoctoral Fellowship Grant, which recognizes and supports graduate student research excellence, is named after her.

In 1986, Dawson was awarded the Outstanding Service Award from the Bernese Mountain Dog Club of America for her service to the breed and the club.

== Major publications ==
- Later Tertiary Leporidae of North America (1958)
- Late Eocene rodents (Mammalia) from Inner Mongolia (1964)
- Contributions in Quaternary vertebrate paleontology : a volume in memorial to John E. Guilday (1984, edited with Hugh H. Genoways)
- Papers on fossil rodents in honor of Albert Elmer Wood (1989, edited by Craig Call Black)
- Dawn of the age of mammals in Asia (1998, edited with K. Christopher Beard)
- Paleogene rodents of Eurasia (2003)
- Fanfare for an uncommon paleontologist : papers in honor of Malcolm C. McKenna (2004, edited with Jason A. Lillegraven)
