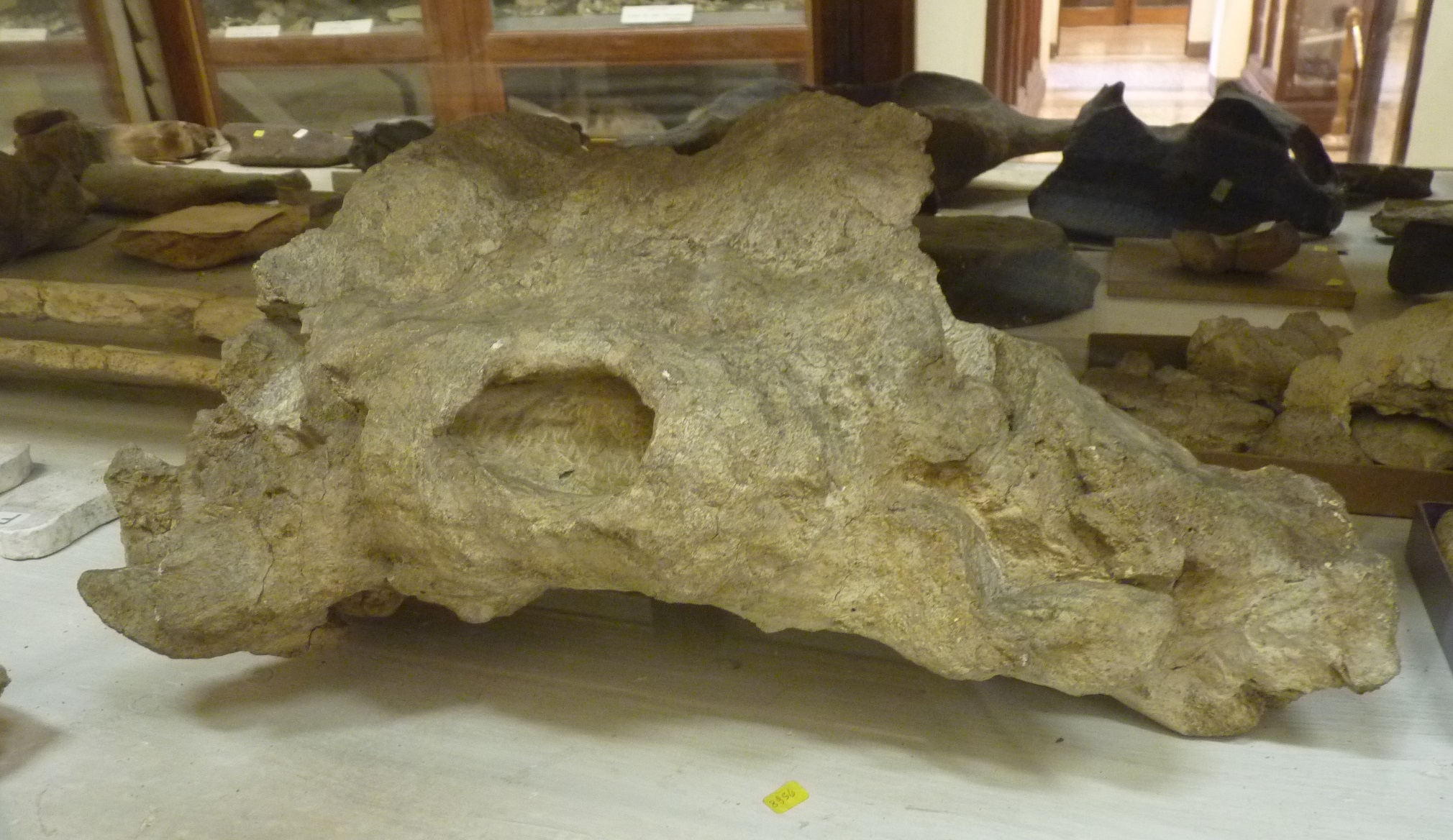
- C. lintianus

Scientific classification
- Kingdom: Animalia
- Phylum: Chordata
- Class: Mammalia
- Order: Artiodactyla
- Infraorder: Cetacea
- Family: †Cetotheriopsidae
- Genus: †Cetotheriopsis; Brandt 1871

Species
- C. lintianus (Meyer, 1849) (type)

= Cetotheriopsis =

Extinct genus of cetaceans

Cetotheriopsis is a genus of extinct cetaceans of the family Cetotheriopsidae.

== Taxonomy ==
The type species of this genus, C. lintianus, was originally described as a species of Balaenodon (a genus of extinct sperm whale) by German paleontologist Hermann von Meyer. It was eventually recognized as distinct from the type species of Balaenodon, and it was given the new generic name Stenodon. However, it was later renamed Cetotheriopsis because Stenodon had already been used for a gastropod by Constantine Samuel Rafinesque in 1818. For his part, Pierre-Joseph van Beneden coined Aulocetus as a replacement name for Stenodon, unaware of the earlier replacement name. Since Cetotheriopsis has priority over Aulocetus and both were based on the same type species, Aulocetus is a junior objective synonym of Cetotheriopsis.

=== Misassigned species ===
- Aulocetus sammarinensis was formerly assigned to this genus, but is now recognized as a distinct genus, Titanocetus. Aulocetus lovisati and A. calaritanus, both from Miocene-age deposits in Italy, are also generically distinct and in need of new generic names.
- Aulocetus latus, known from a Tortonian-age geologic unit in Portugal, is now assigned to Adicetus.
