= Donald McKenna (philanthropist) =

American businessman

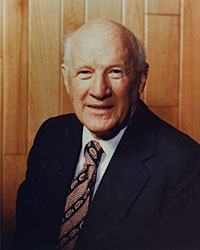
Donald McKenna, unknown date.

Donald Carnegie McKenna (10 October 1907 – 26 November 1997) was an American businessperson and philanthropist. He is best remembered as a founder of and major donor to the Claremont McKenna College, a liberal arts college and member of the Claremont Colleges, located in Claremont, California.

== History ==
McKenna was born in Washington, DC in 1907 to Eliza and Alexander G. McKenna. His father was a Pennsylvania steel metallurgist. His grandmother, Anna Hogan McKenna, was a cousin of Andrew Carnegie, and the families were close.

The family moved to Claremont in 1918. There McKenna met Bernice Waller; they married in 1928. Their son Malcolm McKenna was born in 1930. They had four grandchildren, Douglas McKenna, Katharine McKenna, Andrew McKenna, and Bruce McKenna.

In 1929, McKenna graduated Phi Beta Kappa with a bachelor's degree in English literature from Pomona College. He then earned his master's degree, with a thesis entitled "Naturalism of Thomas Hardy" at Claremont Graduate University in 1931. Both institutions are members of the Claremont Colleges.

He continued on to Harvard to pursue a Ph.D. but left in 1934, when he was called back to California during the Great Depression to manage the Pomona Pump Company, a family business in the Pomona Valley that made submersible pumps and marine engine parts. His brother Philip McKenna founded McKenna Metals Company in 1940, renamed Kennametal Inc. in 1943, a major steel cutting and mining manufacturer and distributor based in Latrobe, Pennsylvania. Donald was an original partner of what became Kennametal and member of its board of directors. He became chairman of the board in 1969 and retired in 1978.

With cousin Charles McKenna, he bred Arabian horses, winning numerous medals at the Los Angeles County Fairgrounds in Pomona. McKenna was a collector of Native American art, especially Hopi kachina dolls. He died at age 90, on 26 November 1997 at his home in Laguna Beach.

== Claremont McKenna College ==
McKenna played a key role in the founding of the school that later came to bear his name, first with his own money in 1944 and through fundraising. It was organized to be a business and public affairs college for returning servicemen ready to study under the G.I. Bill. It was named Claremont Men's College on opening in 1946. He continued to contribute to the development of it as a member of the board of directors for the rest of his life.

Becoming coeducational in 1976, Claremont Men's College changed its name to Claremont McKenna College in 1981, in honor of its founding trustee.

McKenna also established the McKenna Merit Scholarship program, the McKenna Professorship in Asian Economics, and the McKenna International Summer Internship Program for students pursuing summer internships abroad in their sophomore and junior years.
