= Margaret Lewis (paleontologist) =

Carnivore paleontologist; Professor

- Education: Ph.D.
- Alma mater: Stony Brook University
- Known for: evolution and ecology of Carnivora in the Neogene of East Africa
- Awards: President, Society of Vertebrate Paleontology 2022-2024
- Scientific career
- Fields: Vertebrate Paleontology, Paleoecology
- Institutions: Stockton University (1996-Present)
- Thesis: (1995)
- Website: stockton.edu/sciences-math/faculty-staff/faculty-lewis.html

Margaret E. Lewis is an anthropologist and vertebrate paleontologist at Stockton University. Her most important scientific work includes studies of the Carnivora of East Africa that were associated with the early evolution of humans, including paleoecological studies of their speciation and extinction, the paleobiology of extinct Felidae like Dinofelis, and the assembly of carnivoran paleocommunities. Lewis received her PhD in at Stony Brook University in 1995 and her bachelor's degree at Rice University in 1988, both in anthropology. She served as President of the Society of Vertebrate Paleontology in 2022–24.
