= Catherine E. Badgley =

American paleontologist and professor

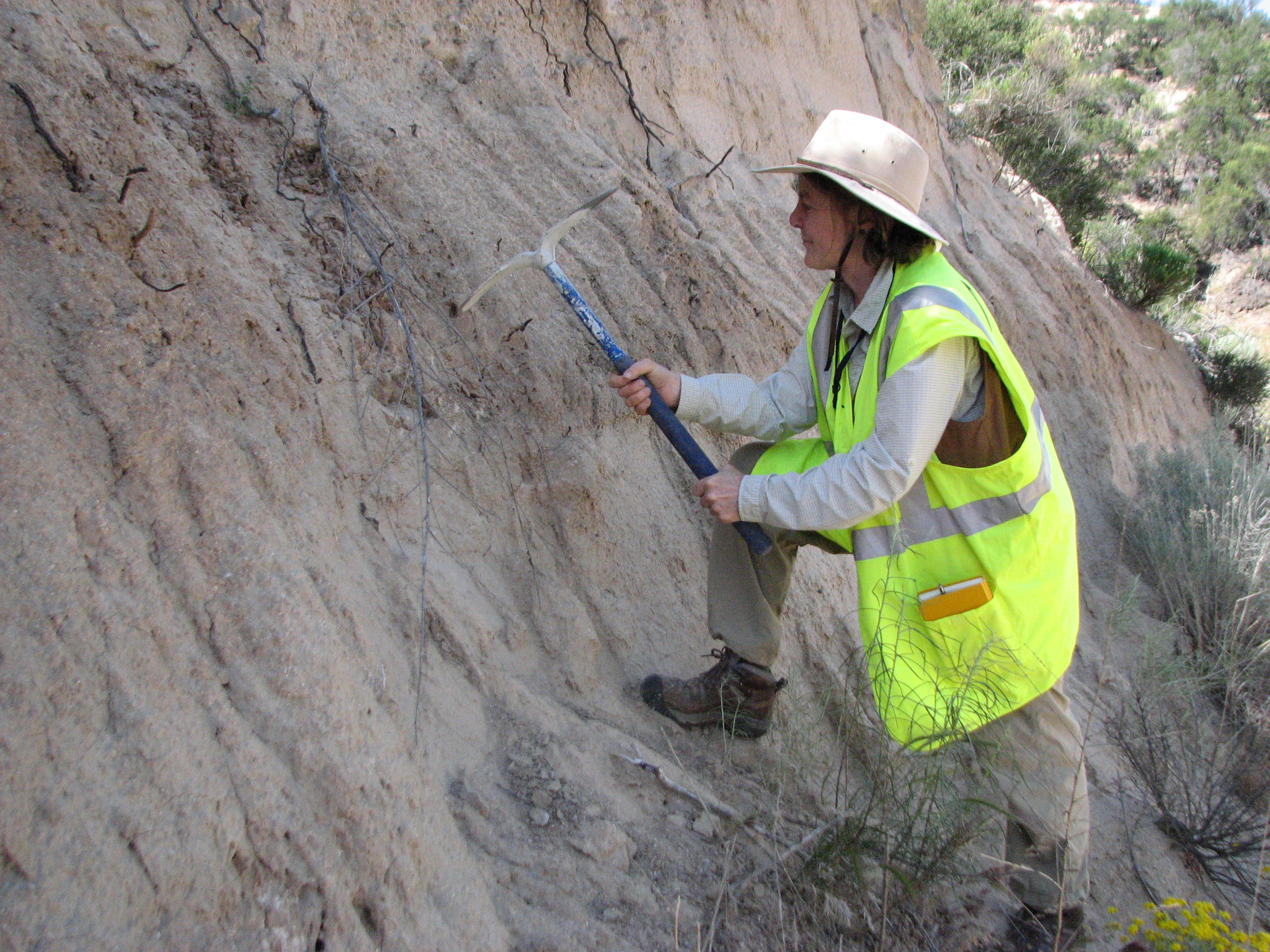
- Born: Catherine Elizabeth Badgley; November 15, 1950 (age 75)
- Education: Yale (Ph.D., M.S.); Radcliff College (B.S.)
- Scientific career
- Fields: Vertebrate Paleontology, Paleoecology
- Workplaces: Michigan (1982-Present)
- Website: lsa.umich.edu/eeb/people/faculty/cbadgley.html

Catherine E. Badgley (born November 15, 1950) is an American paleontologist and professor in the Department of Ecology and Evolutionary Biology at the University of Michigan, Ann Arbor. She is also currently the director of the university's Residential College.

The focus of Badgley's research is the evolution and fossil history and biodiversity of mammals, especially the role of mountains in driving biodiversity patterns. She has also pursued research on organic agriculture and global food supplies, for which she has received considerable public attention. Badgley has also authored a children's book, Pippa's First Summer, with artist Bonnie Miljour.

Badgley received a Ph.D. from the Biology Department at Yale University in 1982, a Master of Forest Science degree from Yale School of Forestry and Environmental Studies in 1974, and a Bachelor of Science degree from Radcliffe College (Harvard University) in 1972. Badgley served as president of the Society of Vertebrate Paleontology from 2006 to 2008.
