= Journal of Vertebrate Paleontology =

- Discipline: Paleontology, vertebrates
- Language: English
- Edited by: Lars Werdelin, Alan Turner

Publication details
- History: 1980–present
- Publisher: Taylor & Francis for the Society of Vertebrate Paleontology
- Frequency: Bimonthly
- Impact factor: 2.190 (2017)

Standard abbreviations
- ISO 4: J. Vertebr. Paleontol.

Indexing
- ISSN: 0272-4634 (print); 1937-2809 (web)
- LCCN: 81645781
- JSTOR: 02724634
- OCLC no.: 238100068

Links
- Journal homepage; Online access; Online archive; Online access at BioOne; Journal page at society's website

The Journal of Vertebrate Paleontology is a bimonthly peer-reviewed scientific journal that was established in 1980 by Jiri Zidek (University of Oklahoma). It covers all aspects of vertebrate paleontology, including vertebrate origins, evolution, functional morphology, taxonomy, biostratigraphy, paleoecology, paleobiogeography, and paleoanthropology. The journal is published by Taylor & Francis on behalf of the Society of Vertebrate Paleontology. According to Journal Citation Reports, the journal has a 2017 impact factor of 2.190.
