= Malcolm McKenna =

American paleontologist (1930–2008)

Malcolm C. McKenna
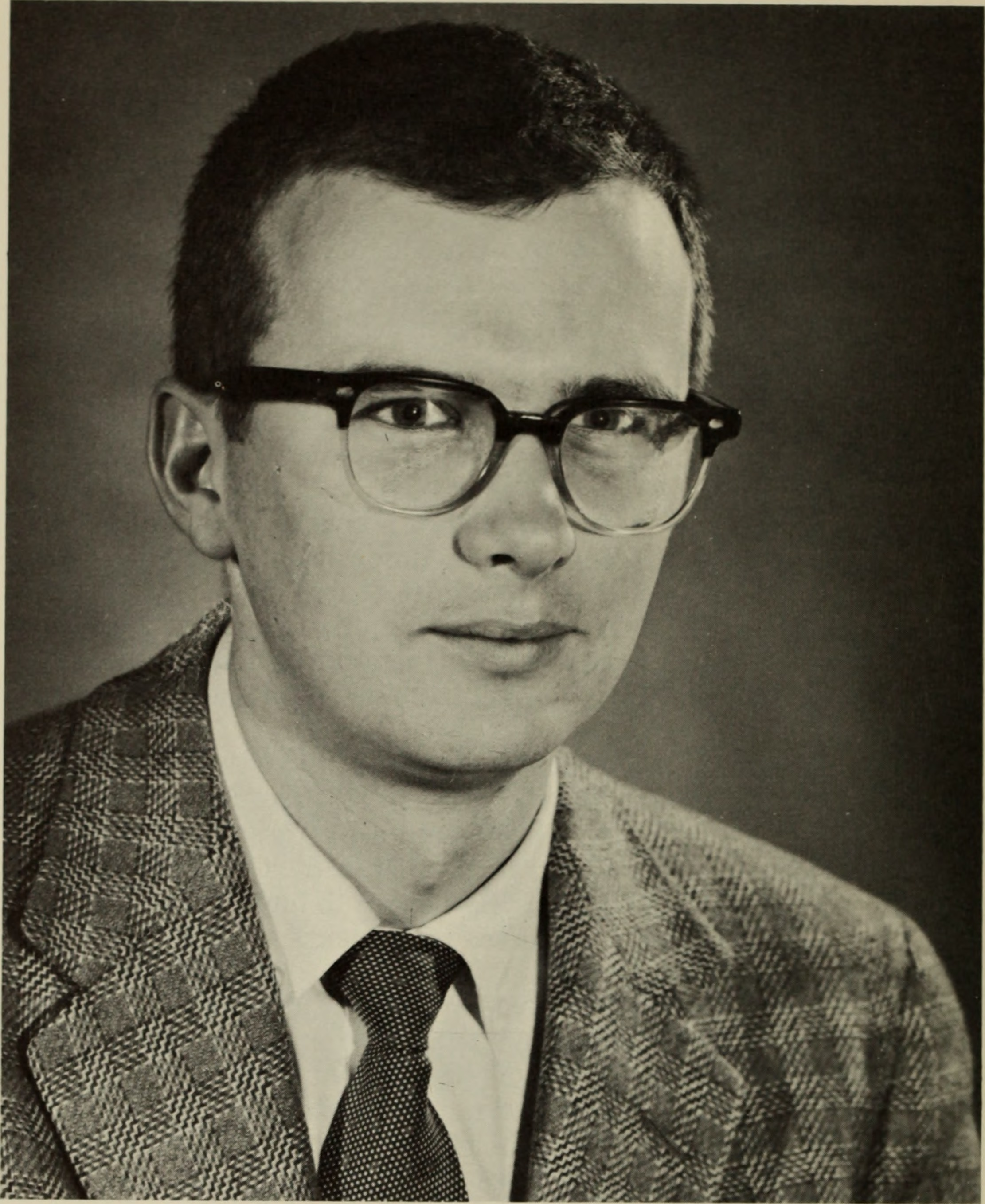
- Born: July 21, 1931; Pomona, California
- Died: March 3, 2008 (aged 76); Boulder, Colorado
- Education: California Institute of Technology; Pomona College; University of California, Berkeley (Ph.D., 1958)
- Known for: Classification of mammals
- Children: Douglas, Andrew, Katharine, and Bruce
- Awards: President, Society of Vertebrate Paleontology (1975-76); Paleontological Society Medal (1992); Romer-Simpson Medal (2001)
- Scientific career
- Fields: paleontology; molecular biology; geology
- Workplaces: American Museum of Natural History; Columbia University
- Doctoral advisor: Donald E. Savage

Malcolm Carnegie McKenna (21 July 1931 – 3 March 2008) was an American paleontologist and author on the subject.

== Paleontologist ==
McKenna began his paleontology career at the Webb School of California (grades 9-12) in Claremont, California, under noted paleontologist and teacher, Raymond Alf. He attended the California Institute of Technology and Pomona College, then graduated in paleontology at the University of California, Berkeley, where he also earned his Ph.D.

He was the curator of vertebrate paleontology at the American Museum of Natural History in New York City. Through most of his four decades at the museum, he held a professorship in geosciences at Columbia University. From 1975 to 1976 he served as president of the Society of Vertebrate Paleontology.

With Susan K. Bell, he co-authored the 1997 book Classification of Mammals Above the Species Level, a comprehensive work genealogy of Mammalia, including the systematics, relationships, and occurrences of all Mammal taxa, living and extinct, down through the rank of genus. In 1992 he was awarded the Paleontological Society Medal and the Romer-Simpson Medal in 2000, the Society of Vertebrate Paleontology’s highest honor.

== Family ==
McKenna was born in Pomona, California, the son of Bernice and Donald McKenna, a founding trustee of Claremont McKenna College in Southern California.

He was a resident of Englewood, New Jersey, while he was at the American Museum of Natural History. His wife, Priscilla, had served as President of the City Council for many years. A great-grandparent was a cousin of the steel magnate Andrew Carnegie.

Since 2013, McKenna has been listed on the Advisory Council of the National Center for Science Education.

McKenna's son, Bruce, is a screenwriter whose work has included the television miniseries The Pacific.

McKenna's daughter, Katharine L. McKenna, is an artist living in Woodstock, NY.

Malcolm Carnegie McKenna died on March 3, 2008, in Boulder, Colorado.
