= External occipital crest =

Ridge of the occipital bone

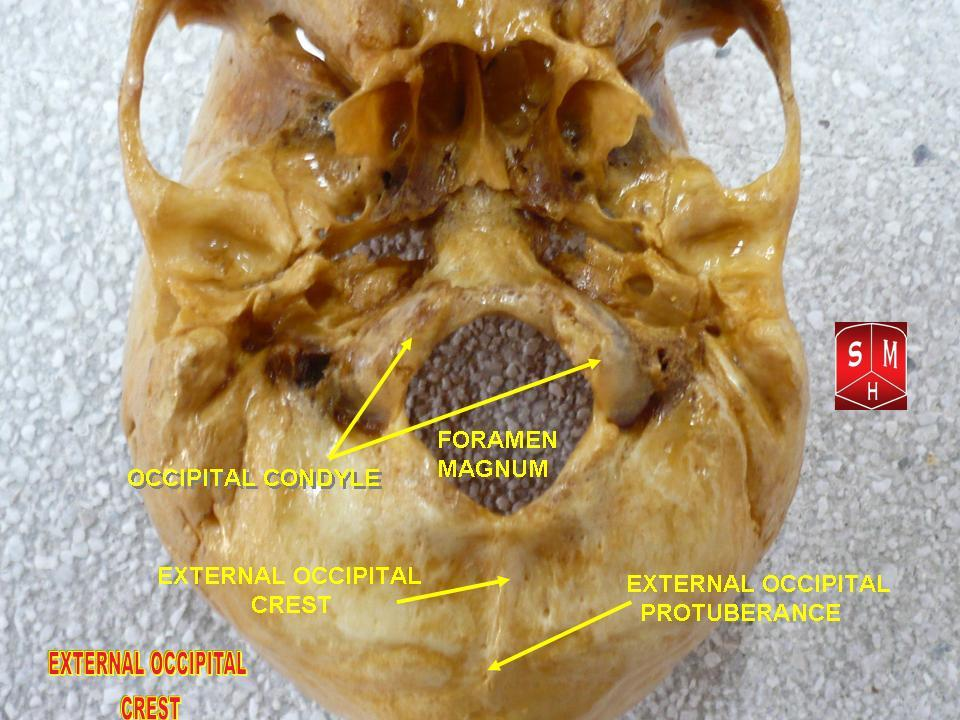
- Skull seen from below

Details

Identifiers
- Latin: crista occipitalis externa
- TA98: A02.1.04.023
- TA2: 569
- FMA: 75753

The external occipital crest is part of the external surface of the squamous part of the occipital bone. It is a ridge along the midline, beginning at the external occipital protuberance and descending to the foramen magnum, that gives attachment to the nuchal ligament. It is also called the median nuchal line.
