= Charles Lewis Gazin =

American paleontologist

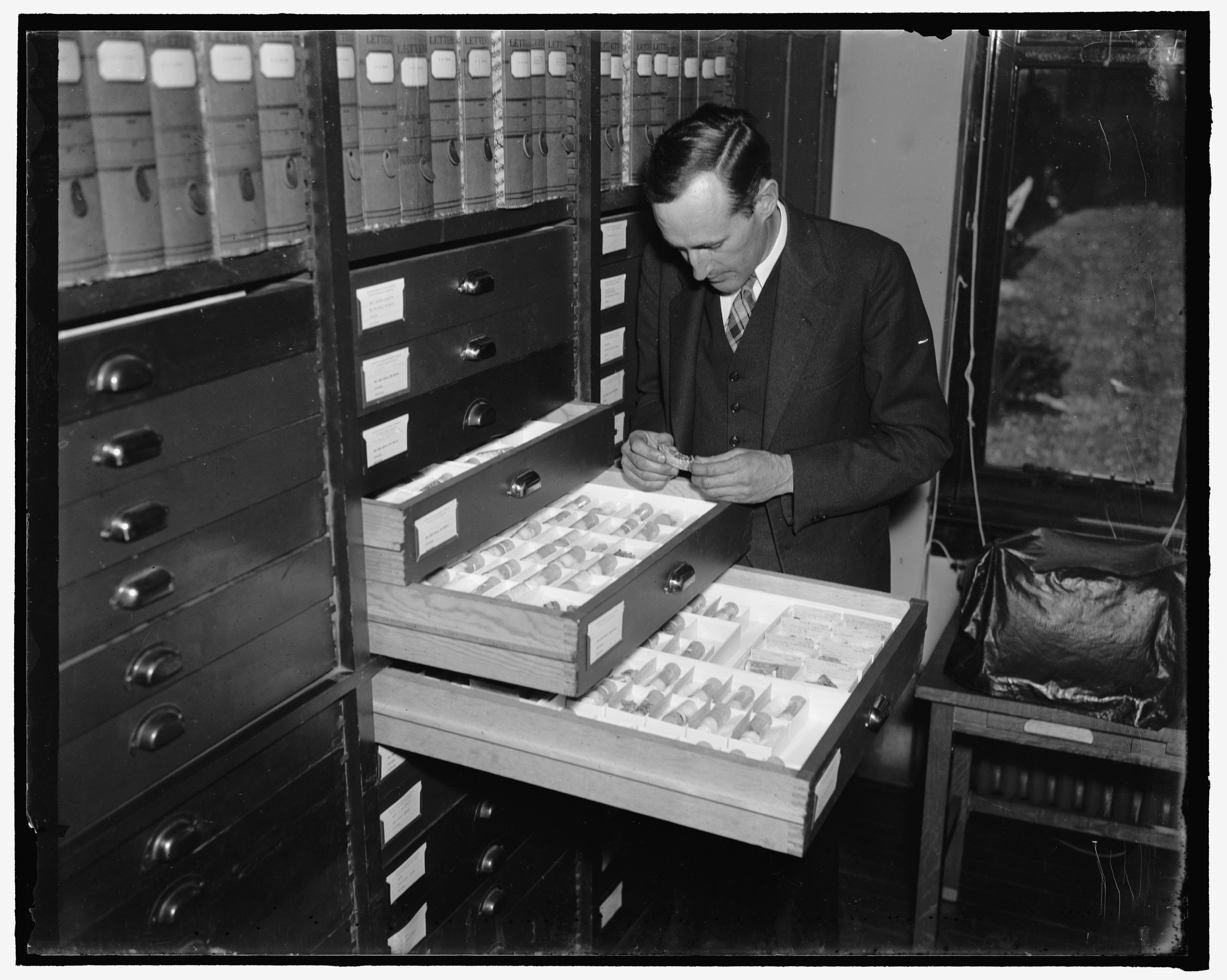
- Born: 1904; Colorado, USA
- Died: 1996 (aged 91–92)
- Scientific career
- Fields: Paleontology; Paleobiology
- Institutions: California Institute of Technology; Society of Vertebrate Paleontology; American Geological Institute; United States National Museum

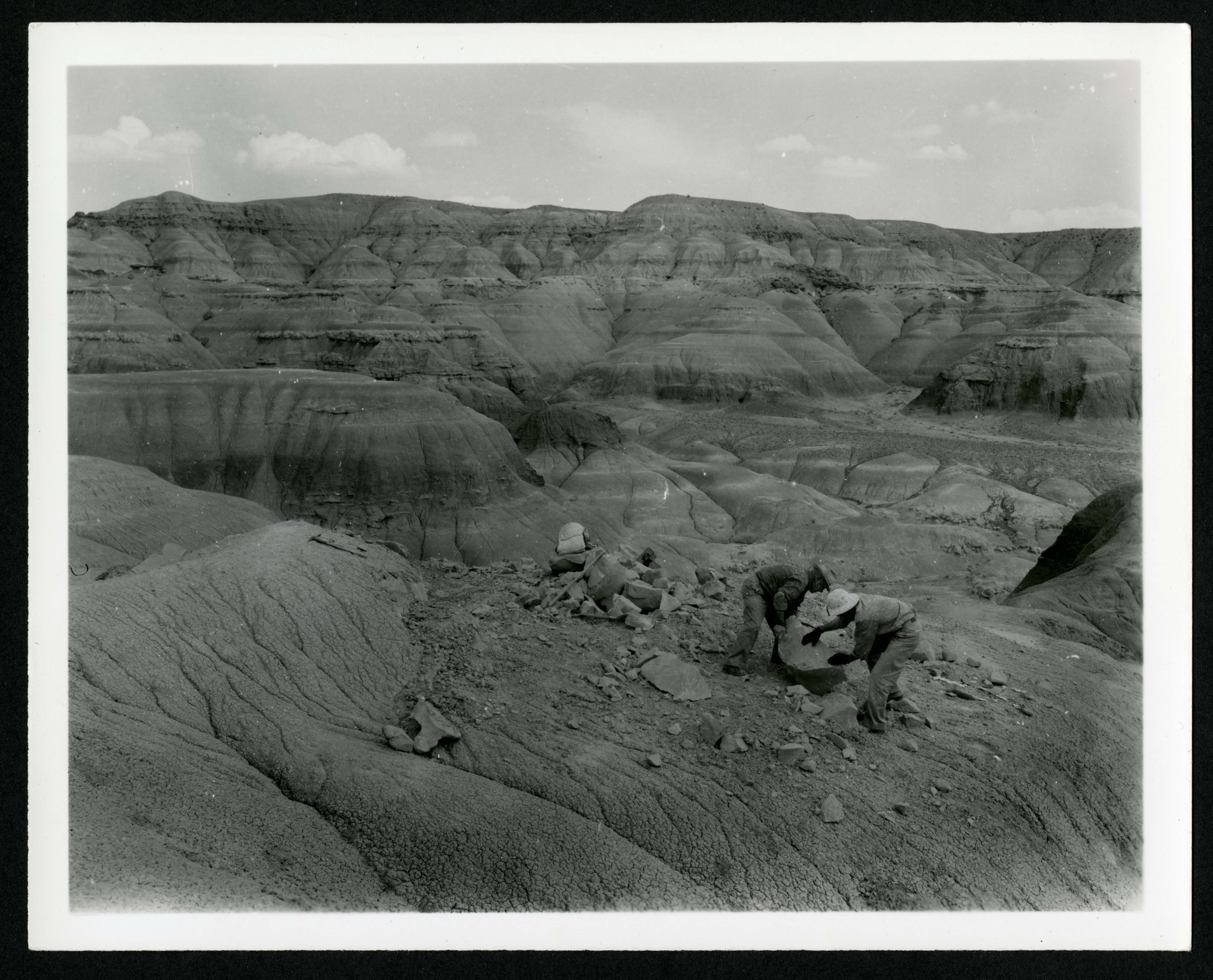
Charles Lewis Gazin's field work and collecting in Wyoming, 1941.

Charles Lewis Gazin (1904–1996) was an American vertebrate paleontologist and paleobiologist.

== Biography ==
Gazin was born in Colorado Springs, Colorado on 18 June, 1904, to Charles Edward and Janie Frances (née Nicklaus) Gazin.

In 1942, he was commissioned as First Lieutenant in the United States Army Air Forces, and was eventually promoted to Major. He received the Legion of Merit in 1946, for work on radar scopes.

He had a son named Chester. Charles Gazin died in 1996.

== Career ==
Gazin completed a senior thesis in geology in 1927. He was close friends with the physicist Carl Anderson from an early age. Both men attended California Institute of Technology together for bachelor's and graduate education and received their doctorates on the same day in 1930. During the same year he began working for the United States Geological Survey. He was named Assistant Curator in the Division of Vertebrate Paleontology at the Smithsonian Institution in 1932. Ten years later, in 1942 he became Associate Curator and in 1946, a Curator of the Division. He was named Senior Paleobiologist in 1967, and when his retirement came in 1970, he got a Paleobiologist Emeritus position. Twelve years later in 1982 he became a Curator Emeritus. He wrote ninety-nine works on vertebrate paleontology, most of which were focused on mammalian paleontology. Gazin served as President of the Society of Vertebrate Paleontology and was a Director of the American Geological Institute.

=== Discoveries ===
The giant ground sloth and Uintatherium of North America were discovered by Gazin, and displayed in the Smithsonian Natural History Museum.

Gazin also described the genus Conoryctella.
