= Žídek =

Žídek (feminine Žídková) is a Czech surname. Židek (feminine Židková) is a Slovak surname. They are diminutives of the surname Žid and the word Žid, meaning 'Jew'. Notable people with the surnames include:

- Ivo Žídek (1926–2003), Czech opera singer
- Monika Brzesková (née Žídková; born 1977), Czech politician and beauty pageant titleholder
- Radoslav Židek (born 1981), Slovak snowboarder

== See also ==
- 58578 Žídek, a main belt asteroid
- Anna Carin Zidek (born 1973), Swedish biathlete
