= Jiri Zidek (paleontologist) =

American paleontologist

Jiri Zidek (born Jiří Zídek; active 1970–2000s) is a Czech-born American paleontologist and entomologist.

He was founder of the Journal of Vertebrate Paleontology at the University of Oklahoma in 1980.

== Publications ==
- Zidek, Jiri (1976-05-05) "Kansas Hamilton Quarry (Upper Pennsylvanian) Acanthodes, with remarks on the previously reported North American occurrences of the genus". ISSN 0075-5052.
