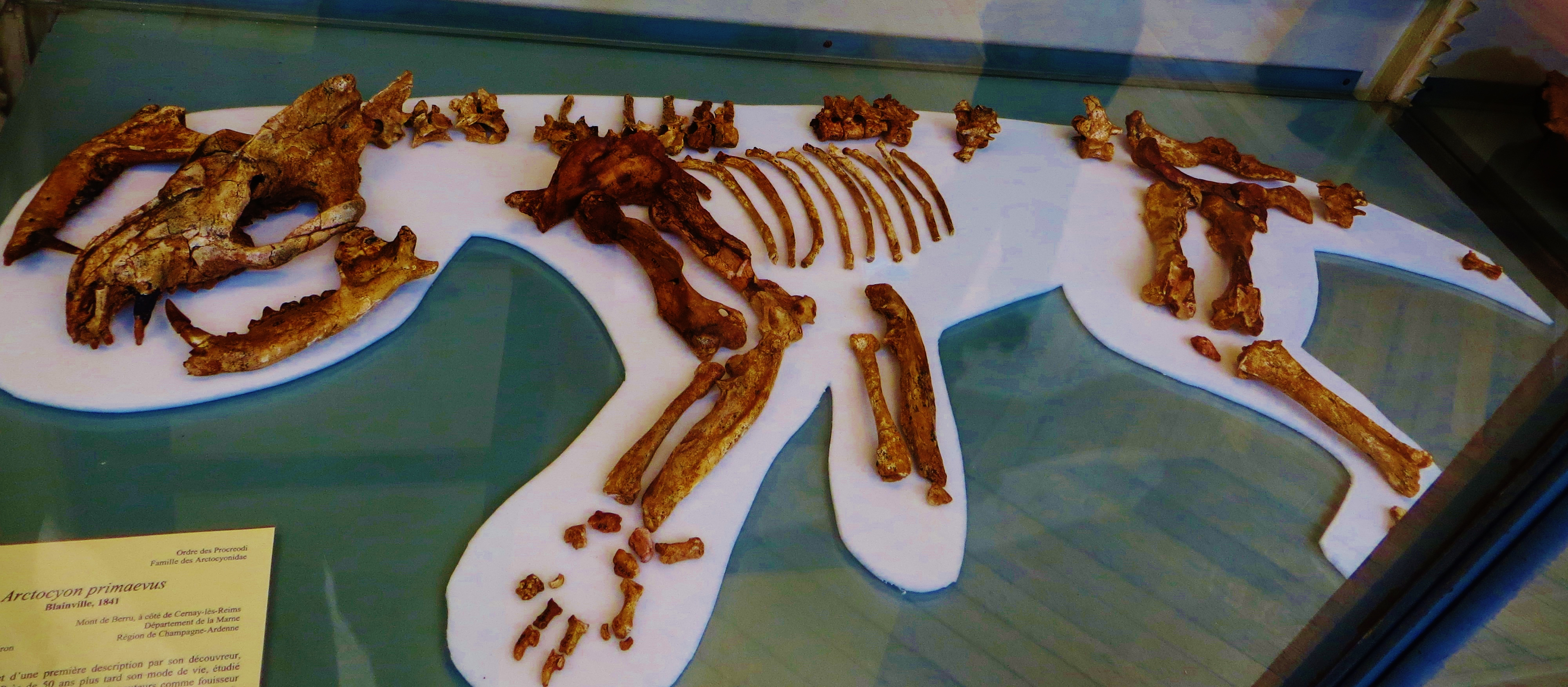
- Fossils of Arctocyon primaevus

Scientific classification
- Kingdom: Animalia
- Phylum: Chordata
- Class: Mammalia
- Grandorder: Ferungulata
- Order: †Arctocyonia; Van Valen, 1969

Families
- †Arctocyonidae †Oxyclaenidae

= Arctocyonia =

Arctocyonians Temporal range: Early Paleocene to Early Eocene 65.5–53.1 Ma

Extinct clade of mammals

Arctocyonia (Arctocyonians; also known as "Procreodi") (from Ancient Greek ἄρκτος (árktos), meaning "bear", and κύων (kúon), meaning "dog", and thus, "bear-dog") were a clade of Ferungulata mammals that roamed North America, Europe, and possibly Asia from the Early Paleocene to the Early Eocene epoch. While Halliday et al. (2015) have classified the group as members of Ferae, others suggests a closer relation to ungulates classifying them as stem-artiodactyls. There are two families classified in the order: Arctocyonidae and Oxyclaenidae.
