= Society of Vertebrate Paleontology =

American professional organization

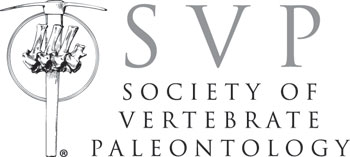
- Abbreviation: SVP
- Predecessor: Section on Vertebrate Paleontology, Paleontological Society
- Formation: December 1940; 85 years ago
- Founded at: Cambridge, Massachusetts
- Type: non-profit
- Legal status: charitable 501(c)(3)
- Purpose: scientific
- Location: 1660 International Drive, Suite 600 McLean, VA 22102
- Fields: Vertebrate Paleontology; Evolution; Stratigraphy
- Members: 2,300 (2017)
- President: Kristi Curry Rogers
- Vice President: Taissa Rodrigues
- Past President: Stuart Sumida
- Main organ: Journal of Vertebrate Paleontology
- Website: vertpaleo.org

The Society of Vertebrate Paleontology (SVP) is a professional organization that was founded in the United States in 1940 to advance the science of vertebrate paleontology around the world.

== Mission and activities ==
SVP has about 2,300 members internationally and holds annual scientific conferences in North America and elsewhere. It is organized for educational and scientific purposes with a mission to "advance the science of vertebrate paleontology and to serve the common interests and facilitate the cooperation of all persons concerned with the history, evolution, comparative anatomy, and taxonomy of vertebrate animals, as well as field occurrence, collection, and study of fossil vertebrates and the stratigraphy of the beds in which they are found." SVP is also concerned with the conservation and preservation of fossil sites. SVP publications include the Journal of Vertebrate Paleontology, the SVP Memoir Series, the News Bulletin, the Bibliography of Fossil Vertebrates and most recently Palaeontologia Electronica.

== History ==
SVP was founded as an independent society in 1940 by a group of scientists who had formed the 'section of vertebrate paleontology' in the Paleontological Society six years earlier. Among the founding members were George Gaylord Simpson, who was nine years later also a founding member of the Society for the Study of Evolution, and Alfred Sherwood Romer. SVP's members wanted to maintain a strong focus on evolution and zoology at a time when the Paleontological Society was becoming increasingly biostratigraphic and industry focused. SVP's first president was Al Romer (served 1940-41), and its current president is Kristi Curry Rogers. Eight out of the last twelve of SVP's presidents have been women (Annalisa Berta, Catherine E. Badgley, Blaire Van Valkenburgh, Catherine Forster, Emily Rayfield, Margaret Lewis, Jessica Theodor, and Kristi Curry Rogers), as is the president-elect (Taissa Rodrigues).

== Public policies ==
SVP considers that "vertebrate Fossils are significant nonrenewable paleontological resources that are afforded protection by federal, state and local environmental laws and guidelines", and that scientifically important fossils, especially those found on public land, should be held in the public trust, preferably in a museum or research institution, where they can benefit the scientific community as a whole. The Paleontological Resources Preservation Act. S. 546 and H. R. 2416 were introduced in the US Congress with the support of SVP. SVP has also been involved in legal action to protect the original boundaries of Grand Staircase–Escalante and Bears Ears national monuments, both of which were established to provide protection for paleontological resources.

The ethics by-law of SVP states "The barter, sale, or purchase of scientifically significant vertebrate fossils is not condoned, unless it brings them into or keeps them within a public trust." Because of this, SVP has advocated that scientifically important fossils, such as the theropod skeleton auctioned in Paris in 2018, be placed in public trust repositories like those at major museums and universities.

The position of the SVP is that "The fossil record of vertebrates unequivocally supports the hypothesis that vertebrates have evolved through time" and that evolution is "the central organizing principle of biology, understood as descent with modification" and is important to geology as well. The Society believes only scientifically supported evolutionary theory should be taught in school and that creationism and intelligent design have no place in the scientific curriculum. To this end, SVP has set up programs to train educators in teaching evolution.

== Publications ==
- The Journal of Vertebrate Paleontology (JVP) is the society's flagship publication. JVP was founded in 1980 at the University of Oklahoma and continued in 1984 by SVP. JVP contains original contributions on all aspects of the vertebrate paleontology; including vertebrate origins, evolution, functional morphology, taxonomy, biostratigraphy, paleoecology, paleobiogeography, and paleoanthropology.
- The SVP Memoir Series publishes monographic papers that are longer than JVP articles.
- The News Bulletin has been published for SVP since its founding. The News Bulletin contains minutes of annual business meetings, news from members around the world, address changes, new members, job advertisements, and obituaries.
- The Bibliography of Fossil Vertebrates is an index for publications on all subjects related to vertebrate paleontology.
- Palaeontologia Electronica is the world's first electronic journal of paleontology and is sponsored in part by SVP.

== Awards and prizes ==
The SVP issues the following awards, grants and prizes:

- Cohen Award for Student Research (after Steven Cohen)
- Colbert Prize Student Poster Prize (after Edwin H. and Margaret Colbert)
- Dawson Predoctoral Fellowship Grant (after Mary R. Dawson)
- Estes Memorial Grant (after Richard Estes)
- Gregory Award (after Joseph T. Gregory)
- Hix Preparators' Grant (after Marvin and Beth Hix)
- Honorary Membership
- Institutional Membership (a program for institutions in developing nations)
- Lanzendorf-National Geographic PaleoArt Prizes (after John Lanzendorf)
- Patterson Memorial Grant (after Bryan Patterson)
- Program for Scientists from Economically Developing Nations
- Romer Prize (after Alfred Romer)
- Romer-Simpson Medal (after Alfred S. Romer and George G. Simpson)
- Skinner Award (after Morris Skinner)
- Wood Award (after Albert E. Wood)
- Jackson School of Geosciences Travel Grant
- SVP Futures Award
- Carroll Award (after Robert Carroll)

== See also ==
- EAVP
- Paleontological Society
- Palaeontological Association
