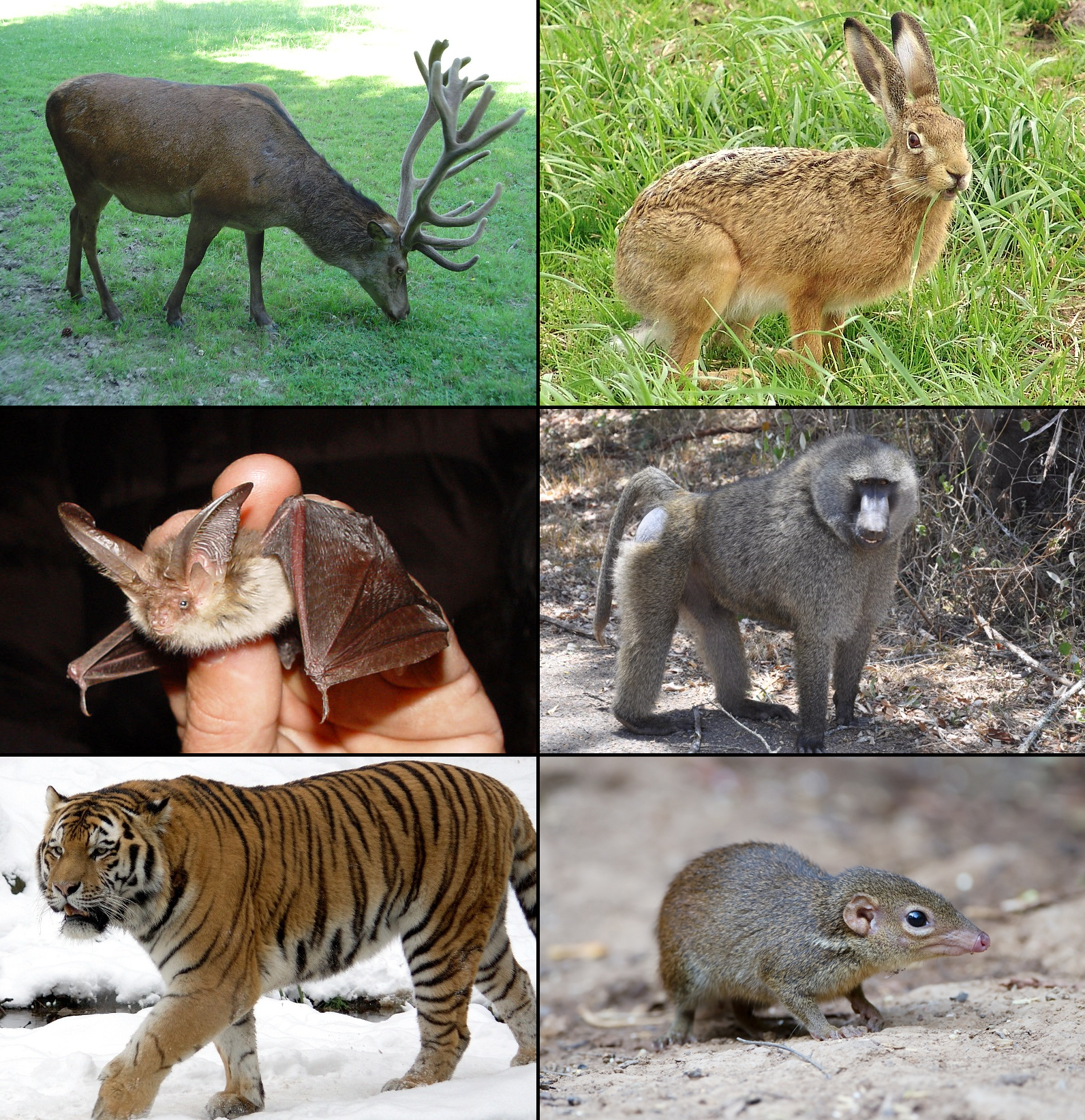

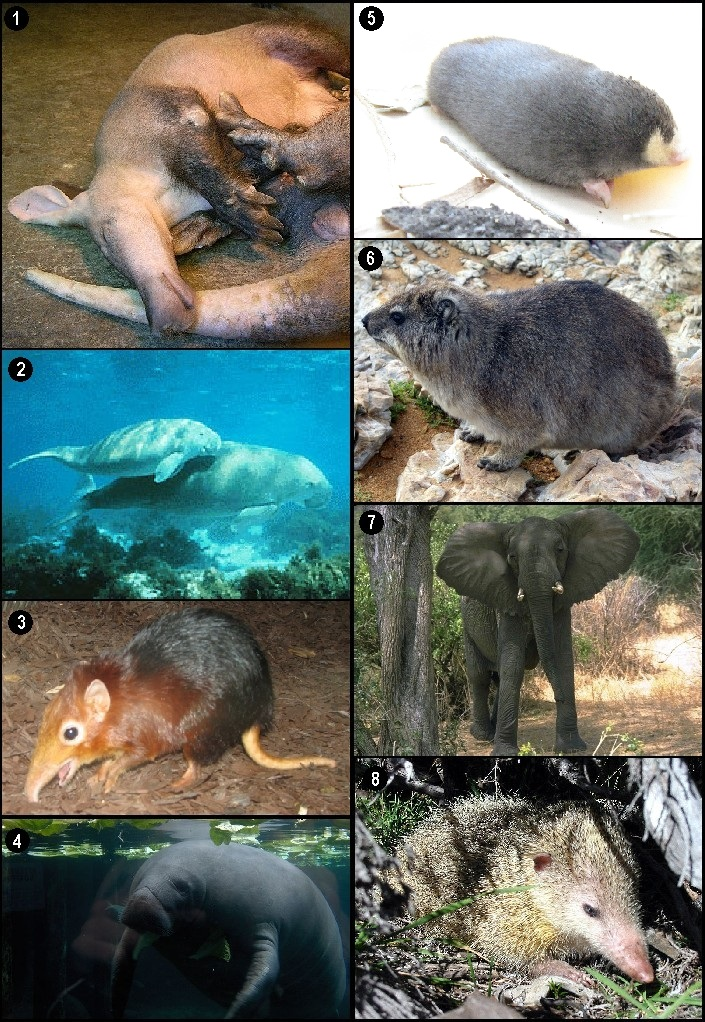

Scientific classification
- Domain: Eukaryota
- Kingdom: Animalia
- Phylum: Chordata
- Class: Mammalia
- Clade: Eutheria
- Infraclass: Placentalia
- Clade: Epitheria

Orders and Clades
- Superorder Afrotheria: Clade Afroinsectiphilia; Clade Paenungulata; Magnorder Boreoeutheria: Superorder Laurasiatheria; Superorder Euarchontoglires

= Epitheria =

Epitheria Temporal range: Late Cretaceous - Recent

Clade of mammals

Epitherians comprise all the placental mammals except the Xenarthra. They are primarily characterized by having a stirrup-shaped stapes in the middle ear, which allows for passage of a blood vessel. This is in contrast to the column-shaped stapes found in marsupials, monotremes, and xenarthrans. They are also characterized by having a shorter fibula relative to the tibia.

Epitheria like Xenarthra and Afrotheria originated after the K-Pg boundary 66 million years ago, with the placental diversification occurring within the first hundred thousand years after the K-Pg event and the first modern placental orders began appearing 2–3 million years later. Epitheres are one of the most successful groups of animals.

The monophyly of Epitheria has been challenged by molecular phylogenetic studies. While preliminary analysis of a set of retroposons shared by both Afrotheria, and Boreoeutheria (presence/absence data) supported the Epitheria clade, more extensive analysis of such transposable element insertions around the time of the divergence of Xenarthra, Afrotheria, and Boreoeutheria strongly support the hypothesis of a near-concomitant origin (trifurcation) of these three superorders of mammals.

Another analysis suggests that the root of this clade lies between the Atlantogenata and Boreoeutheria.

- Placentalia
  - Xenarthra
  - Epitheria
    - Afrotheria
    - Boreoeutheria
      - Euarchontoglires
      - Laurasiatheria

== Alternative hypotheses ==
Alternative hypotheses place either Atlantogenata and Boreoeutheria, or Afrotheria and Exafroplacentalia (Notolegia) at the base of the tree:

- Placentalia
  - Atlantogenata
    - Xenarthra
    - Afrotheria
  - Boreoeutheria
    - Euarchontoglires
    - Laurasiatheria

- Placentalia
  - Afrotheria
  - Exafroplacentalia
    - Xenarthra
    - Boreoeutheria
      - Euarchontoglires
      - Laurasiatheria

One Bayesian analysis places the root between Atlantogenata and Boreoeutheria.
