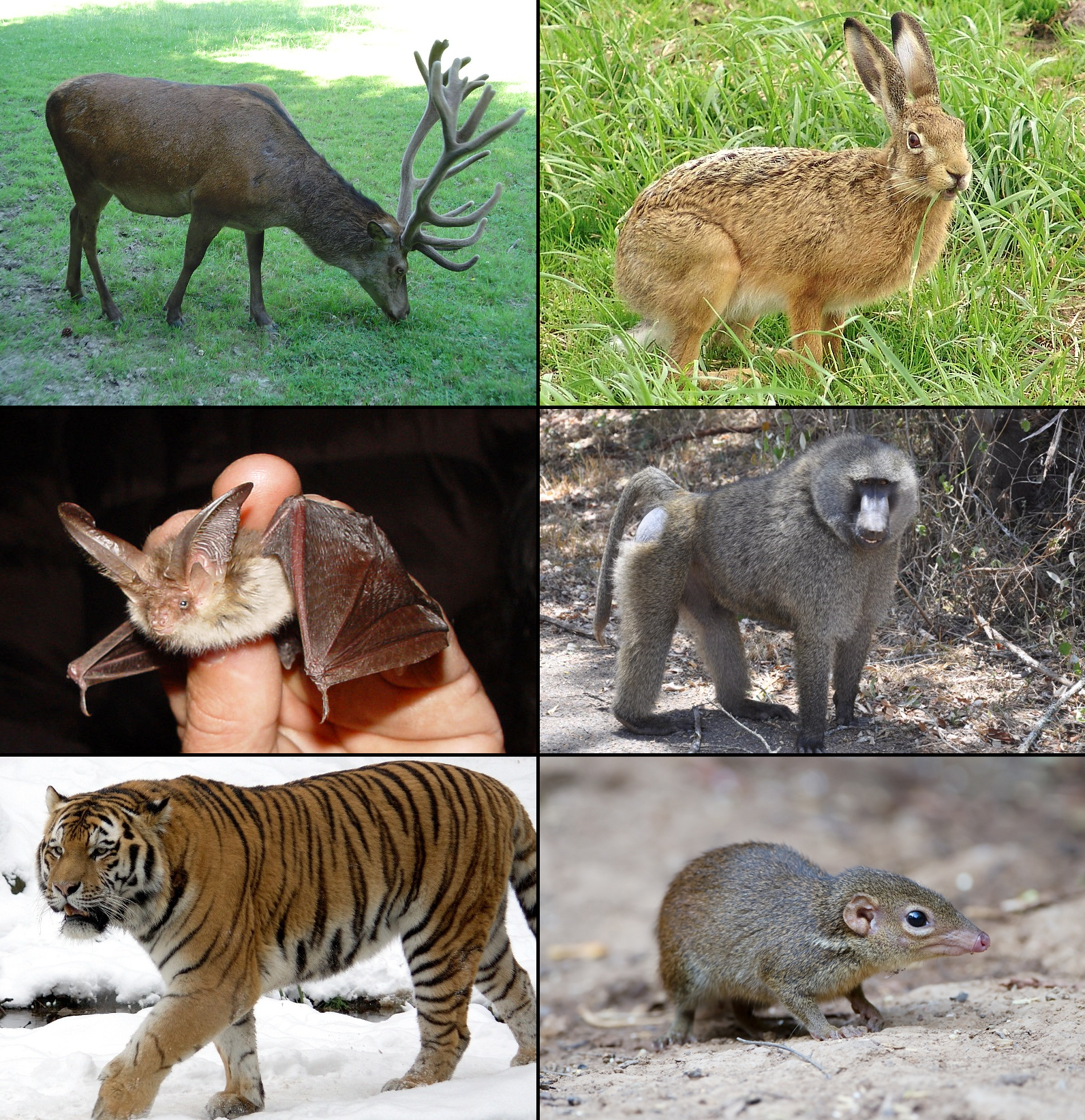

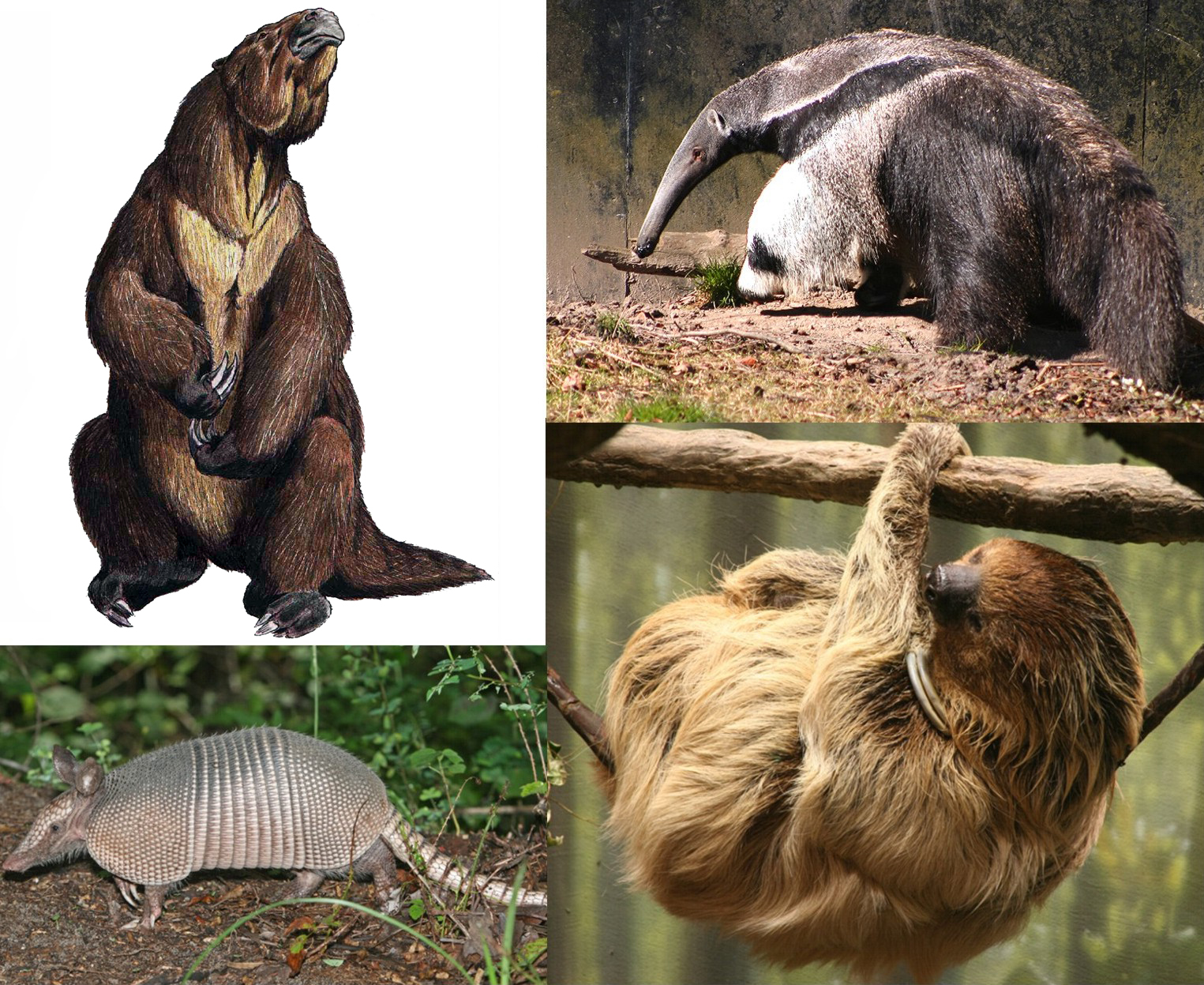

Scientific classification
- Domain: Eukaryota
- Kingdom: Animalia
- Phylum: Chordata
- Class: Mammalia
- Infraclass: Placentalia
- Clade: Exafroplacentalia; Waddell et al, 2001

Subgroups
- Superorder Xenarthra: Order Cingulata (Armadillos); Order Pilosa (Anteaters, sloths); Magnorder Boreoeutheria: Superorder Laurasiatheria; Superorder Euarchontoglires; Afrotheria?

= Exafroplacentalia =

Exafroplacentalia Temporal range: Paleocene - Holocene, 65–0 Ma

Proposed clade of placental mammals

Exafroplacentalia or Notolegia is a clade of placental mammals proposed in 2001 on the basis of molecular research.

Exafroplacentalia places Xenarthra as a sister group to the Boreoeutheria (comprising Laurasiatheria and Euarchontoglires), thus making Afrotheria a primitive group of placental mammals (the group name roughly means "those which are not African placentals").

== Classification ==
- Eutheria
  - Afrotheria
  - Exafroplacentalia
    - Xenarthra
    - Boreoeutheria
      - Laurasiatheria
      - Euarchontoglires

However, this classification makes the autapomorphy (character shared only among Exafroplacentalia) dubious: it is hard to classify a group by the absence of a feature (in this case "not coming from Africa"). Hence, several alternative hypotheses can be considered.

== Alternative hypotheses ==
One alternative hypothesis is the Epitheria hypothesis:

- Placentalia
  - Xenarthra
  - Epitheria
    - Afrotheria
    - Boreoeutheria
      - Euarchontoglires
      - Laurasiatheria

Another alternative hypothesis is the Atlantogenata hypothesis:

- Eutheria
  - Atlantogenata
    - Xenarthra
    - Afrotheria
  - Boreoeutheria
    - Euarchontoglires
    - Laurasiatheria

Updated analysis of transposable element insertions around the time of divergence strongly supports the fourth hypothesis of a near-concomitant origin of the three superorders of mammals:

- Eutheria
  - Xenarthra
  - Afrotheria
  - Boreoeutheria
    - Euarchontoglires
    - Laurasiatheria

== See also ==
- Epitheria
- Atlantogenata
