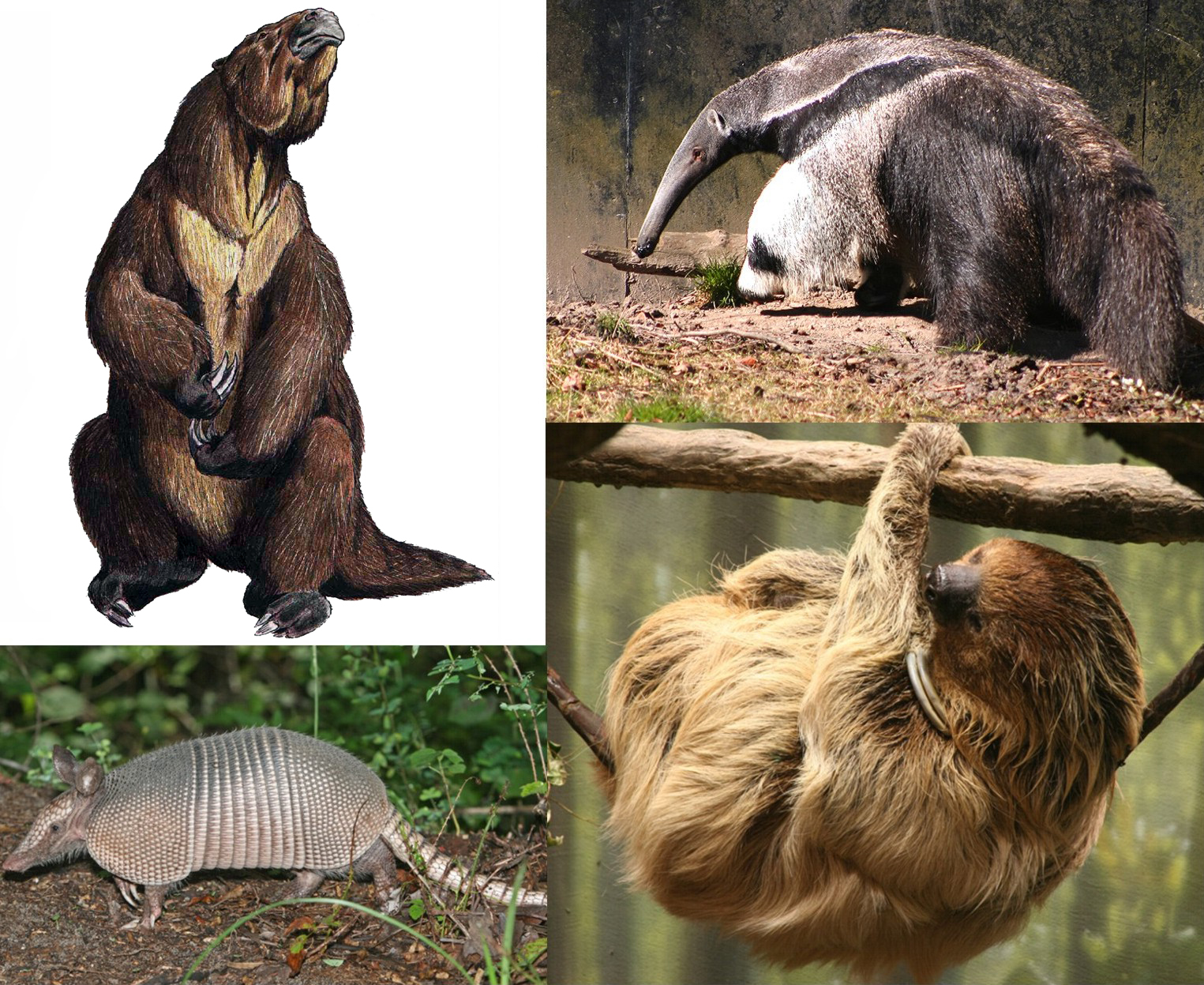
- Clockwise from upper left: the giant ground sloth Megatherium, giant anteater, two-toed sloth, nine-banded armadillo

Scientific classification
- Kingdom: Animalia
- Phylum: Chordata
- Class: Mammalia
- Infraclass: Placentalia
- Magnorder: Atlantogenata
- Superorder: Xenarthra; Cope, 1889

Orders and suborders
- Order Cingulata (armadillos); Order Pilosa; Suborder Folivora (sloths); Suborder Vermilingua (anteaters); See text for more details
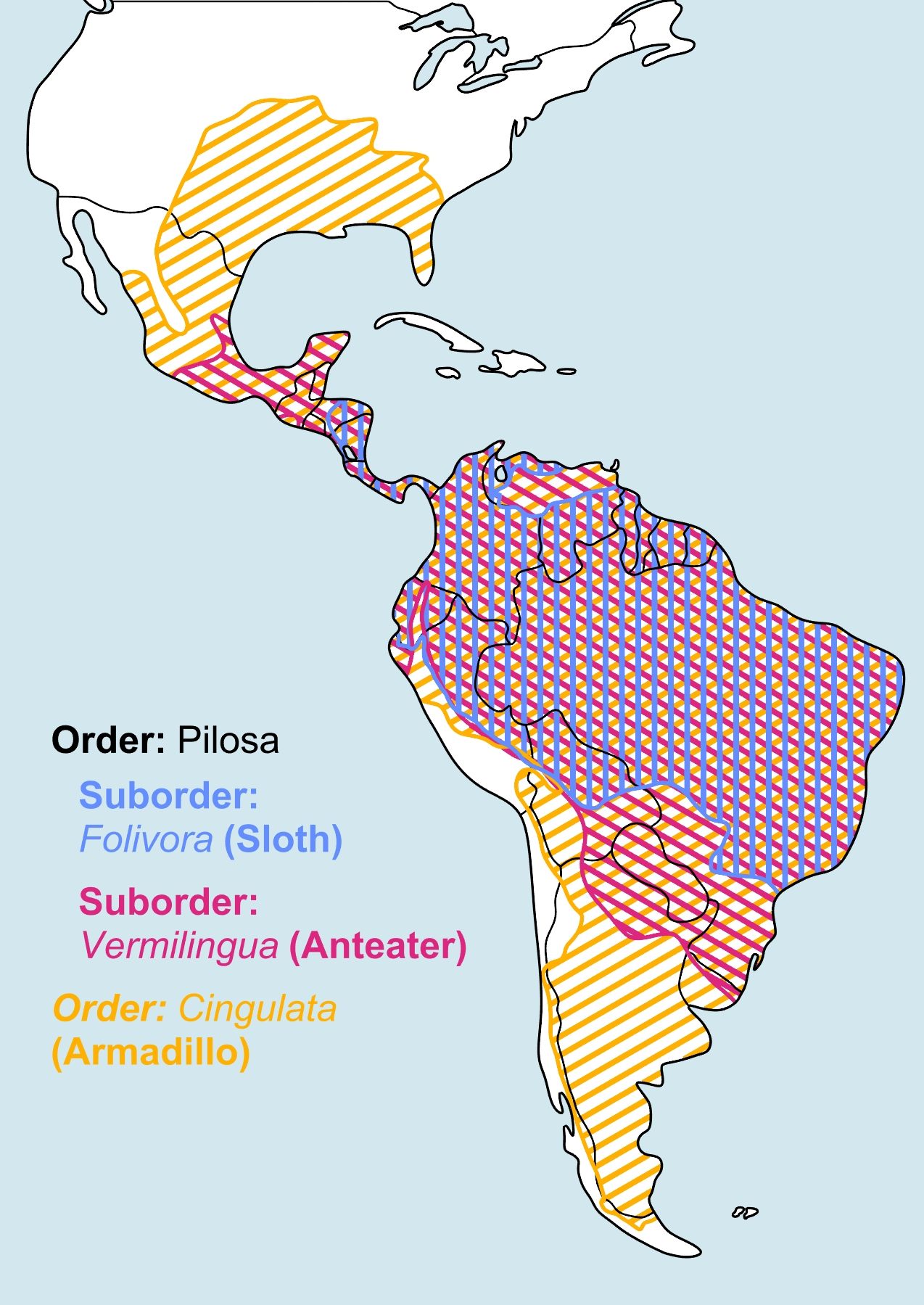
- Blue: Sloth, Red: anteater, Yellow: Armadillo.

= Xenarthra =

Xenarthrans Temporal range: Late Paleocene –Recent, 60–0 Ma

Superorder of mammals including anteaters, sloths, and armadillos

Xenarthra (/zɛˈnɑːrθrə/; from Ancient Greek ξένος (xénos), meaning "strange, foreign", and ἄρθρον (árthron), meaning "joint") is a superorder and major clade of placental mammals native to the Americas. There are 31 living species: the anteaters, tree sloths, and armadillos. Extinct xenarthrans include the glyptodonts, pampatheres and ground sloths, with some glyptodonts and ground sloths reaching sizes of several tonnes, much larger than any living xenarthran. Xenarthrans originated in South America during the late Paleocene about 60 million years ago. They evolved and diversified extensively in South America during the continent's long period of isolation in the early to mid Cenozoic Era. They spread to the Antilles by the early Miocene and, starting about 10 million years ago, spread to Central and North America as part of the Great American Interchange. Nearly all of the formerly abundant megafaunal xenarthrans became extinct at the end of the Pleistocene as part of the end-Pleistocene extinction event.

== Characteristics ==
Xenarthrans share several characteristics that are not present in other placental mammals. The name Xenarthra derives from the two ancient Greek words ξένος (xénos), meaning "strange, unusual", and ἄρθρον (árthron), meaning "joint", and refers to their vertebral joints, which have extra articulations that are unlike other mammals. The ischium of the pelvis is also fused to the sacrum of the spine. Xenarthran limb bones are typically robust, with large processes for muscle attachment. Relative to their body size, living xenarthrans are extremely strong. Their limb bone structures are unusual. They have single-color vision. The teeth of xenarthrans are unique. Xenarthrans are also often considered to be among the most primitive of placental mammals. Females show no clear distinction between the uterus and vagina, and males have testicles inside the body, which are located between the bladder and the rectum. Xenarthrans have the lowest metabolic rates among therians.

=== Dentition ===
The teeth of xenarthrans differ from all other mammals. The dentition of most species is either significantly reduced and highly modified, or absent. With the single exception of Dasypus armadillos and their ancestral genus Propraopus, xenarthrans do not have a milk dentition. They have a single set of teeth through their lives; these teeth have no functional enamel, and usually there are few or no teeth in the front of the mouth and the rear teeth all look alike. As a result, it is impossible to define Xenarthra as having incisors, canines, premolars, or molars. Since most mammals are classified by their teeth, it has been difficult to determine their relationships to other mammals. Xenarthrans may have evolved from ancestors that had already lost basic mammalian dental features like tooth enamel and a crown with cusps; reduced, highly simplified teeth are usually found in mammals that feed by licking up social insects. Several groups of xenarthrans did evolve cheek teeth to chew plants, but since they lacked enamel, patterns of harder and softer dentine created grinding surfaces. Dentine is less resistant to wear than the enamel-cusped teeth of other mammals, and xenarthrans developed open-rooted teeth that grow continuously. Currently, no living or extinct xenarthrans have been found to have the standard mammalian dental formula or crown morphology derived from the ancient tribosphenic pattern.

=== Spine ===
The name Xenarthra, which means "strange joints", was chosen because the vertebral joints of members of the group have extra articulations of a type unlike any other mammals. This trait is referred to as "xenarthry". (Tree sloths lost these articulations to increase the flexibility of their spines, but their fossil ancestors had xenarthrous joints.) Additional points of articulation between vertebrae strengthen and stiffen the spine, an adaptation developed in different ways in various groups of mammals that dig for food. Xenarthrans also tend to have different numbers of vertebrae than other mammals; sloths have a reduced number of lumbar vertebrae with either more or fewer cervical vertebrae than most mammals, while cingulates have neck vertebrae fused into a cervical tube, with glyptodonts fusing thoracic and lumbar vertebrae as well.

=== Vision ===
Xenarthrans have been determined to have single-color vision. PCR analysis determined that a mutation in a stem xenarthran led to long-wavelength sensitive-cone (LWS) monochromacy (single color vision), common in nocturnal, aquatic and subterranean mammals. Further losses led to rod monochromacy in a stem cingulate and a stem pilosan, pointing to a subterranean ancestry; the ancestors of Xenarthra had the reduced eyesight characteristic of vertebrates that live underground. Some authorities state that xenarthrans lack a functional pineal gland; pineal activity is related to the perception of light.

=== Metabolism ===
Living xenarthrans have the lowest metabolic rates among therians. Paleoburrows have been discovered which are up to 1.5 m (5 ft) wide and 40 m (130 ft) long, with claw marks from excavation referred to the ground sloths Glossotherium or Scelidotherium. Remains of ground sloths (Mylodon and others) in caves are particularly common in colder parts of their range, suggesting ground sloths may have used burrows and caves to help regulate their body temperature. Analysis of the fossil South American Lujan fauna suggests far more large herbivorous mammals were present than similar contemporary environments can support. As most large Lujan herbivores were xenarthrans, low metabolic rate may be a feature of the entire clade, allowing relatively low-resource scrublands to support large numbers of huge animals. Faunal analysis also shows far fewer large predators in pre-GABI South American faunas than would be expected based on current faunas in similar environments. This suggests other factors than predation controlled the numbers of xenarthrans. South America had no placental predatory mammals until the Pleistocene, and xenarthran large-mammal faunas may have been vulnerable to many factors including a rise in numbers of mammalian predators, resource use by spreading North American herbivores with faster metabolisms and higher food requirements, and climate change.

== Relationships to other mammals ==
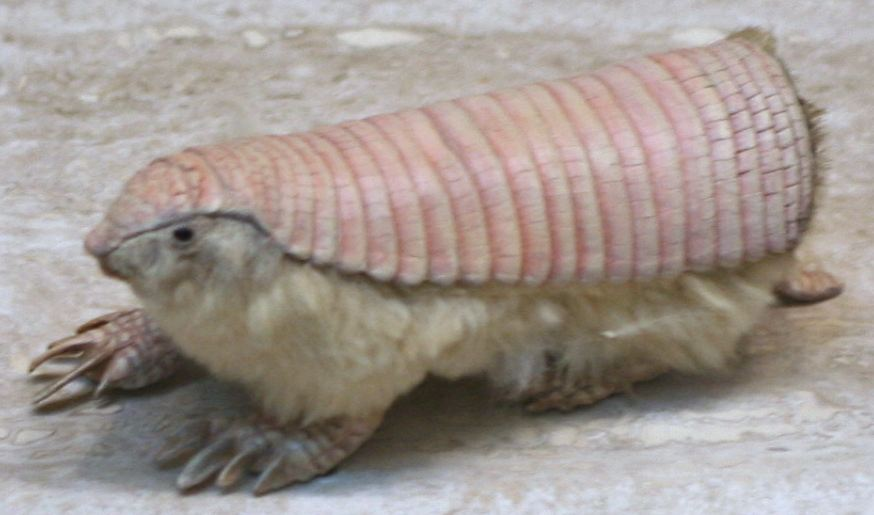
Pink fairy armadillo (Chlamyphorus truncatus)

Xenarthrans were previously classified alongside the pangolins and aardvarks in the order Edentata (meaning toothless, because the members do not have incisors and lack, or have poorly developed, molars). Subsequently, Edentata was found to be a polyphyletic grouping whose New World and Old World taxa are unrelated, and it was split up to reflect their true phylogeny. Aardvarks and pangolins are now placed in individual orders, and the new order Xenarthra was erected to group the remaining families (which are all related). The morphology of xenarthrans generally suggests that the anteaters and sloths are more closely related to each other than either is to the armadillos, glyptodonts, and pampatheres; this idea is upheld by molecular studies. Since its conception, Xenarthra has increasingly come to be considered to be of a higher rank than 'order'; some authorities consider it to be a cohort, while others consider it to be a superorder.

Whatever the rank, Xenarthra is now generally considered to be divided into two orders:

- Cingulata (Latin, "the ones with belts/armor"), the armadillos and the extinct glyptodonts and pampatheres
- Pilosa (Latin, "the ones with fur"), which is subdivided into:
  - Vermilingua ("worm-tongues"), the anteaters
  - Folivora ("leaf-eaters"), the sloths (both tree sloths and the extinct ground sloths). Folivora is also called Tardigrada or Phyllophaga.

Their relationship to other placental mammals is obscure. Xenarthrans have been defined as most closely related to Afrotheria (in the group Atlantogenata), or to Boreoeutheria (in the group Exafroplacentalia), or to Epitheria (Afrotheria+Boreoeutheria, i.e. as a sister group to all other placental mammals). A comprehensive phylogeny by Goloboff et al. includes xenarthrans as a sister clade of Euarchontoglires within Boreoeutheria (Laurasiatheria+Euarchontoglires). Overall, studies using mitochondrial DNA have tended to group them as a sister clade to Ferungulata (carnivorans+ungulates+pholidotans), while studies using nuclear DNA have identified them as 1) a sister clade to Afrotheria, 2) a sister clade to all placentals except Afrotheria, or 3) a trichotomy (three-way split): Afrotheria, Xenarthra, and everything else (i.e. Boreoeutheria). Among studies that use physical characteristics rather than DNA to look at relationships, a large phenomic analysis of living and fossil mammals suggests placental mammals evolved shortly after the end of the Cretaceous, and first split into Xenarthra and Epitheria (all other placentals).

=== Phylogeny ===
Phylogenetic position of xenarthrans (in orange) among placentals in a genus-level molecular phylogeny of 116 extant mammals inferred from the gene tree information of 14,509 coding DNA sequences. The other major clades are colored: marsupials (magenta), afrotherians (red), laurasiatherians (green), and Euarchontoglires (blue).

Below is a recent simplified phylogeny of the xenarthran families based on Slater et al. (2016) and Delsuc et al. (2016). The dagger symbol, "†", denotes extinct groups.

- Xenarthra
  - Cingulata
    - Dasypodidae
    - - †Pampatheriidae
      - Chlamyphoridae
  - Pilosa
    - Vermilingua
      - Cyclopedidae
      - Myrmecophagidae
    - Folivora
      - - †Mylodontidae
        - - Choloepodidae (two-toed sloths)
          - †Megalonychidae
      - - Bradypodidae (three-toed sloths)
        - †Nothrotheriidae
        - †Megatheriidae

== Evolution ==
It has been suggested that the last common ancestor of xenarthrans was myrmecophagous (feeding on ants and termites), with digging and possibly climbing capabilities. The oldest fossils of xenarthrans are isolated remains known from the Itaboraí Formation of Brazil, dating to the early Eocene or possibly latest Paleocene, which already includes remains recognisable as armadillos. Most Eocene remains of xenarthrans are attributed to armadillos. The oldest known sloth, Pseudoglyptodon is known from the late Eocene, with remains known from across South America. The oldest fossils of anteaters date to the Miocene epoch.

== Classification ==
The name Pan-Xenarthra is used for the total group, with the alternative Americatheria having been abandoned. However no unambiguous stem group taxa have been identified.

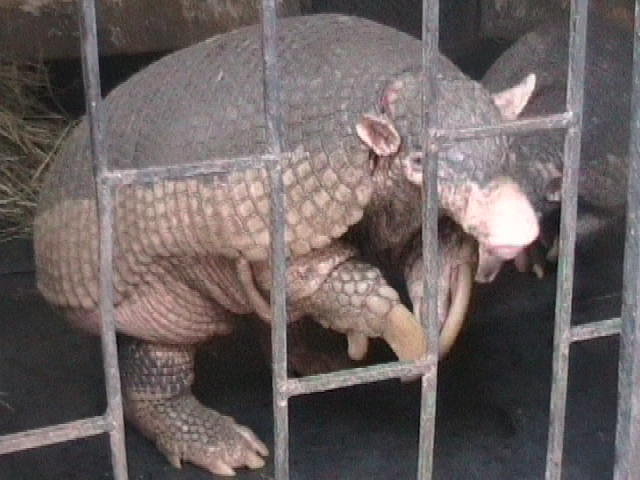
Giant armadillo

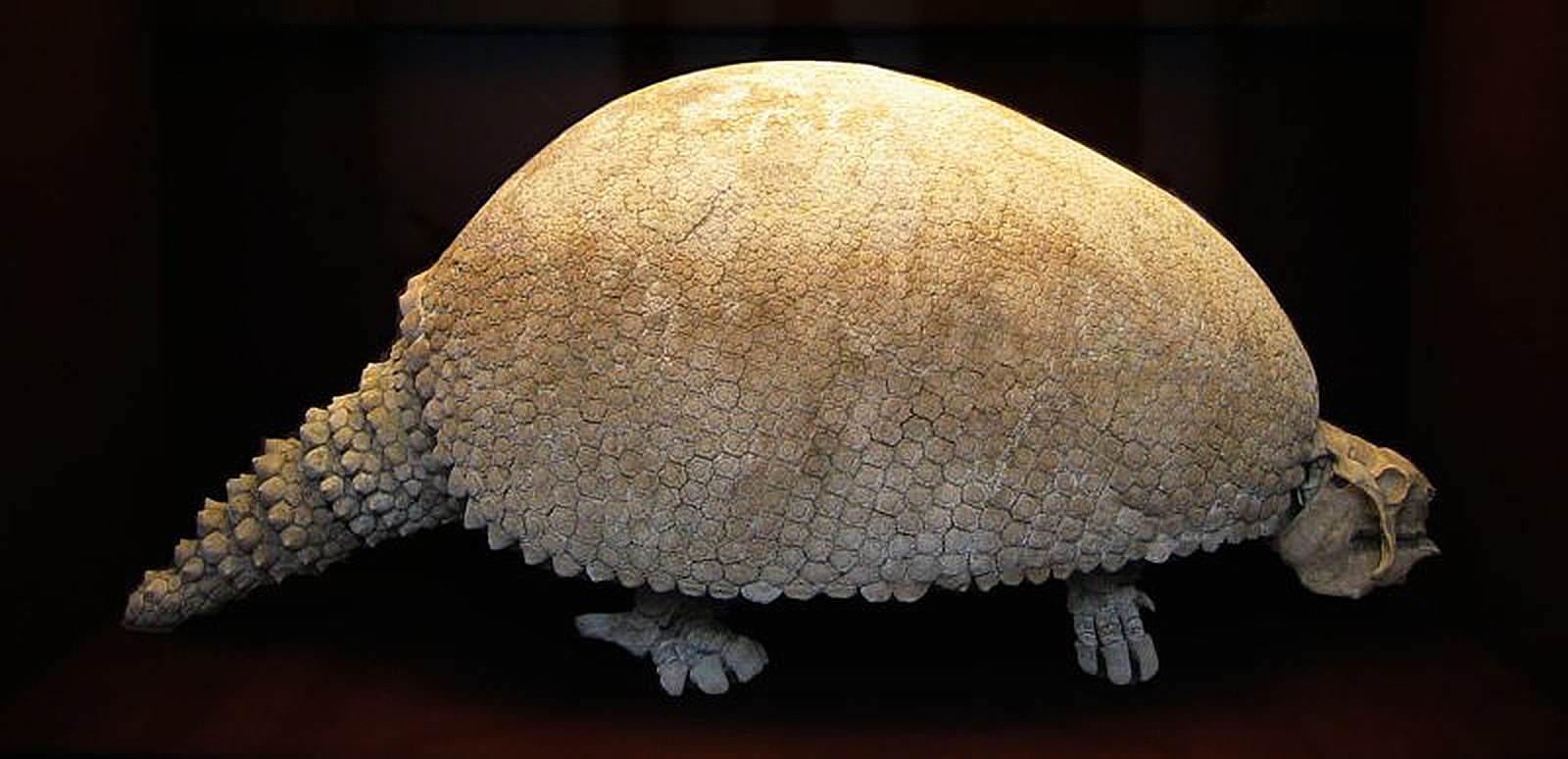
Skeleton of Glyptodon, an extinct glyptodont related to living armadillos

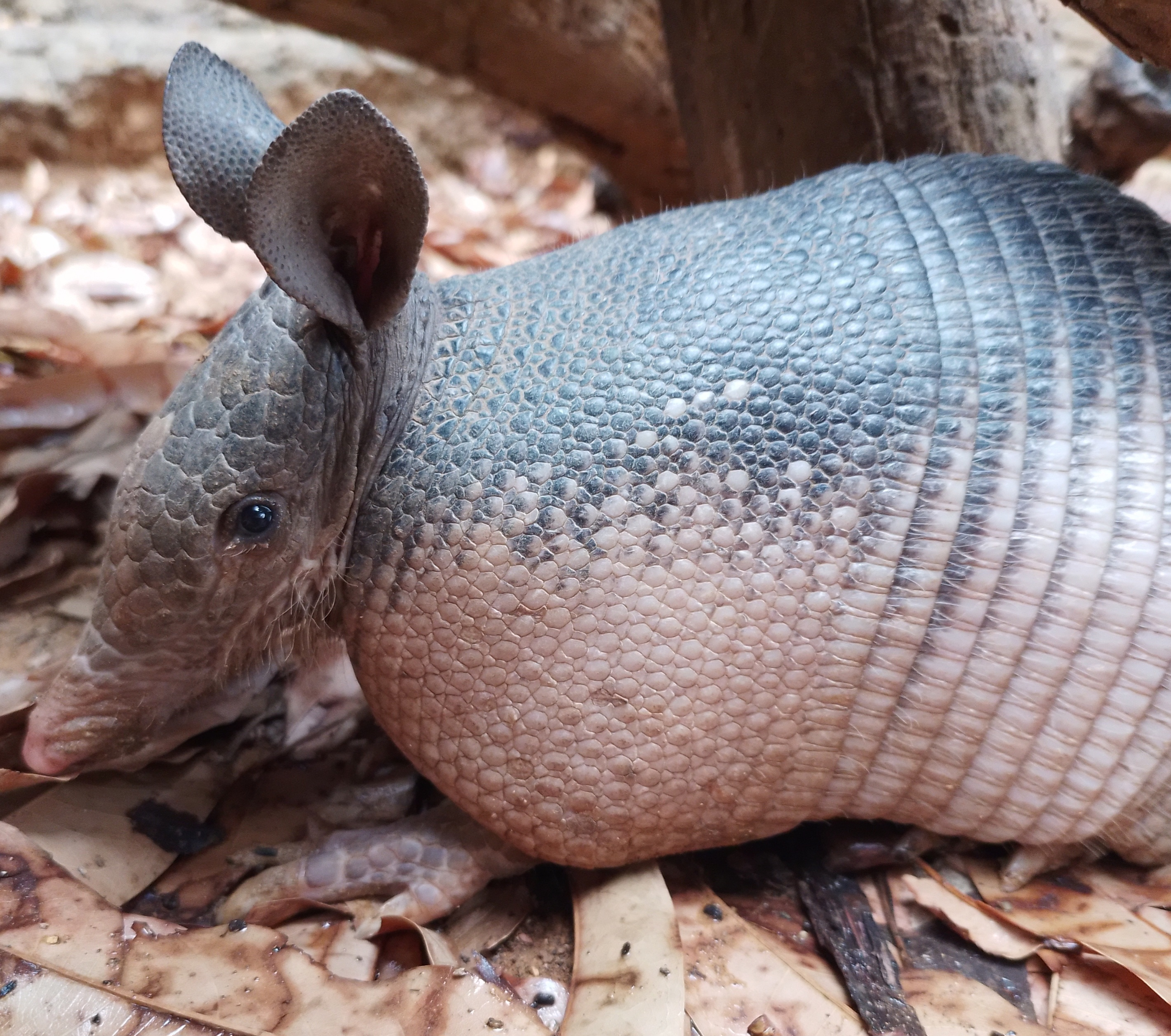
Nine-banded armadillo

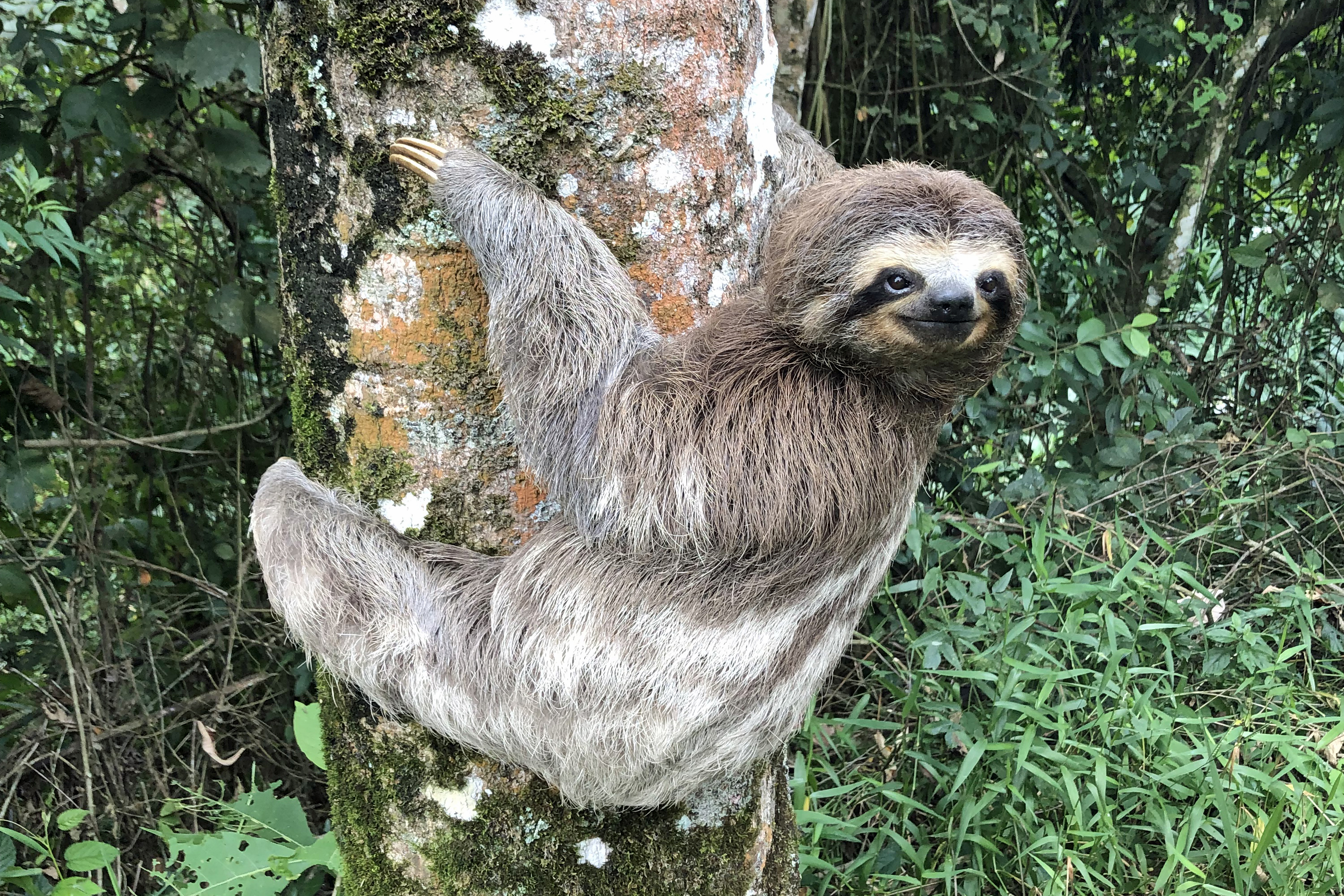
Brown-throated sloth

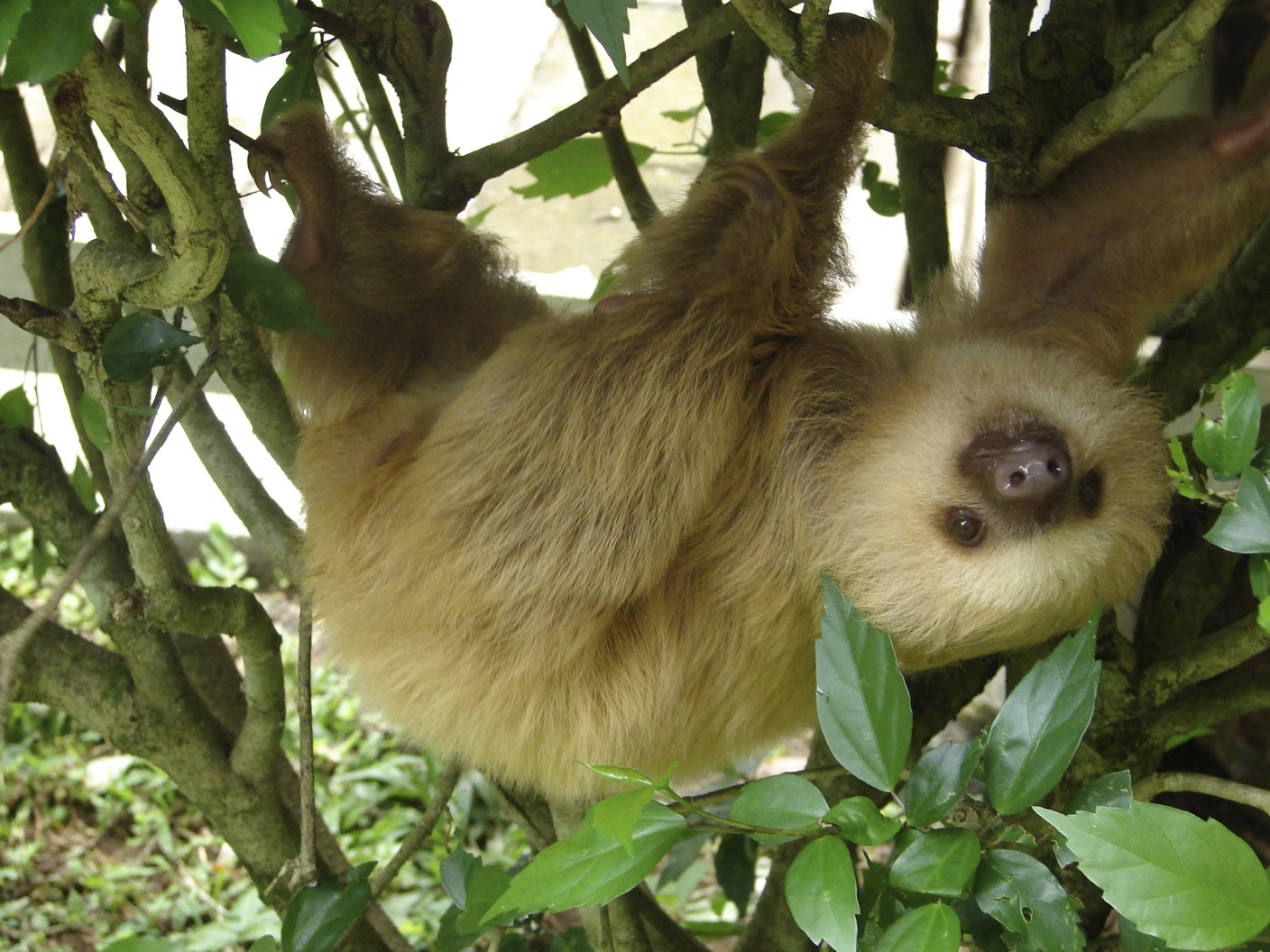
Hoffmann's two-toed sloth

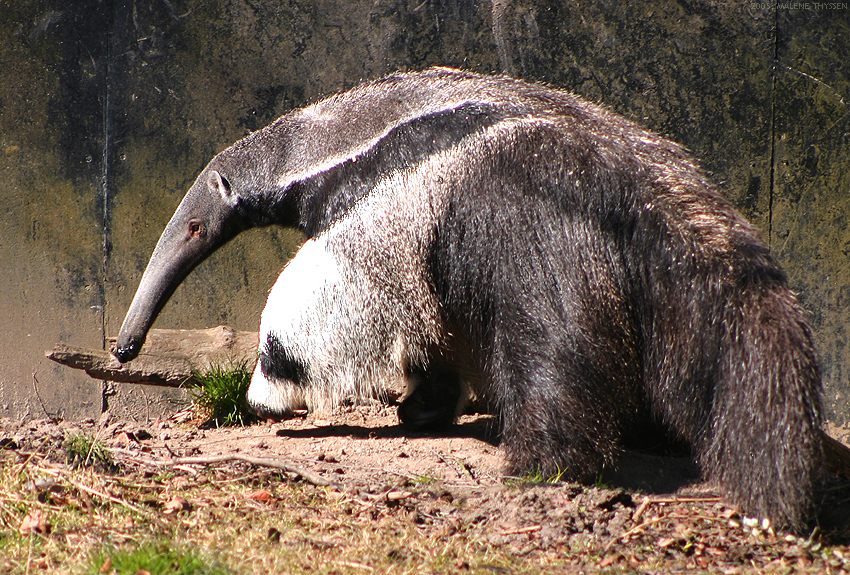
Giant anteater

XENARTHRA

- Order Cingulata
  - Family Chlamyphoridae: armadillos and glyptodonts
    - Greater fairy armadillo, Calyptophractus retusus
    - Pink fairy armadillo, Chlamyphorus truncatus
    - Northern naked-tailed armadillo, Cabassous centralis
    - Chacoan naked-tailed armadillo, Cabassous chacoensis
    - Southern naked-tailed armadillo, Cabassous unicinctus
    - Greater naked-tailed armadillo, Cabassous tatouay
    - Screaming hairy armadillo, Chaetophractus vellerosus
    - Big hairy armadillo, Chaetophractus villosus
    - Andean hairy armadillo, Chaetophractus nationi
    - Six-banded armadillo or yellow armadillo, Euphractus sexcinctus
    - Giant armadillo, Priodontes maximus
    - Southern three-banded armadillo, Tolypeutes matacus
    - Brazilian three-banded armadillo, Tolypeutes tricinctus
    - Pichi or dwarf armadillo, Zaedyus pichiy
    - Subfamily †Glyptodontinae: glyptodonts
  - Family Dasypodidae: long-nosed armadillos
    - Nine-banded armadillo or long-nosed armadillo, Dasypus novemcinctus
    - Seven-banded armadillo, Dasypus septemcinctus
    - Southern long-nosed armadillo, Dasypus hybridus
    - Llanos long-nosed armadillo, Dasypus sabanicola
    - Great long-nosed armadillo, Dasypus kappleri
    - Hairy long-nosed armadillo, Dasypus pilosus
    - Yepes's mulita, Dasypus yepesi
  - Family †Pampatheriidae: pampatheres
- Order Pilosa
  - Suborder Folivora: sloths
    - Family Bradypodidae: three-toed sloths
      - Pygmy three-toed sloth, Bradypus pygmaeus
      - Brown-throated three-toed sloth, Bradypus variegatus
      - Pale-throated three-toed sloth, Bradypus tridactylus
      - Maned three-toed sloth, Bradypus torquatus
    - Family †Megalonychidae: megalonychid ground sloths
    - Family †Megatheriidae: megatheriid ground sloths
    - Family †Nothrotheriidae: nothrotheriid ground sloths and aquatic sloths
    - Family Choloepodidae: two-toed sloths
      - Hoffman's two-toed sloth, Choloepus hoffmanni
      - Linnaeus's two-toed sloth or southern two-toed sloth, Choloepus didactylus
    - Family †Mylodontidae: mylodontid ground sloths
  - Suborder Vermilingua: anteaters
    - Family Cyclopedidae: silky anteaters
      - Silky anteater, Cyclopes didactylus
    - Family Myrmecophagidae: anteaters
      - Giant anteater, Myrmecophaga tridactyla
      - Northern tamandua, Tamandua mexicana
      - Southern tamandua, Tamandua tetradactyla
