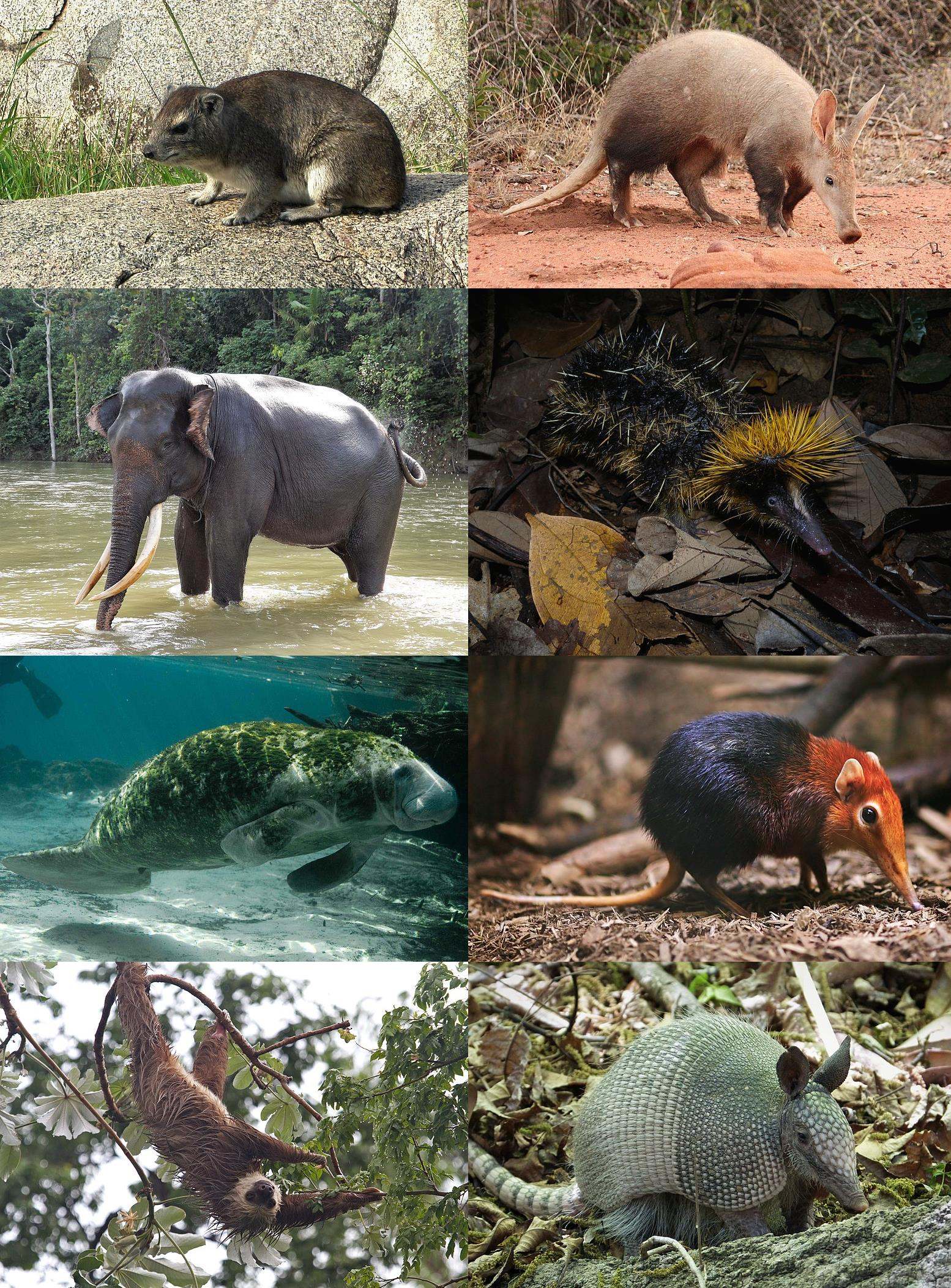

Scientific classification
- Kingdom: Animalia
- Phylum: Chordata
- Class: Mammalia
- Infraclass: Placentalia
- Magnorder: Atlantogenata; Waddell et al, 1999

Subgroups
- Afrotheria; Xenarthra
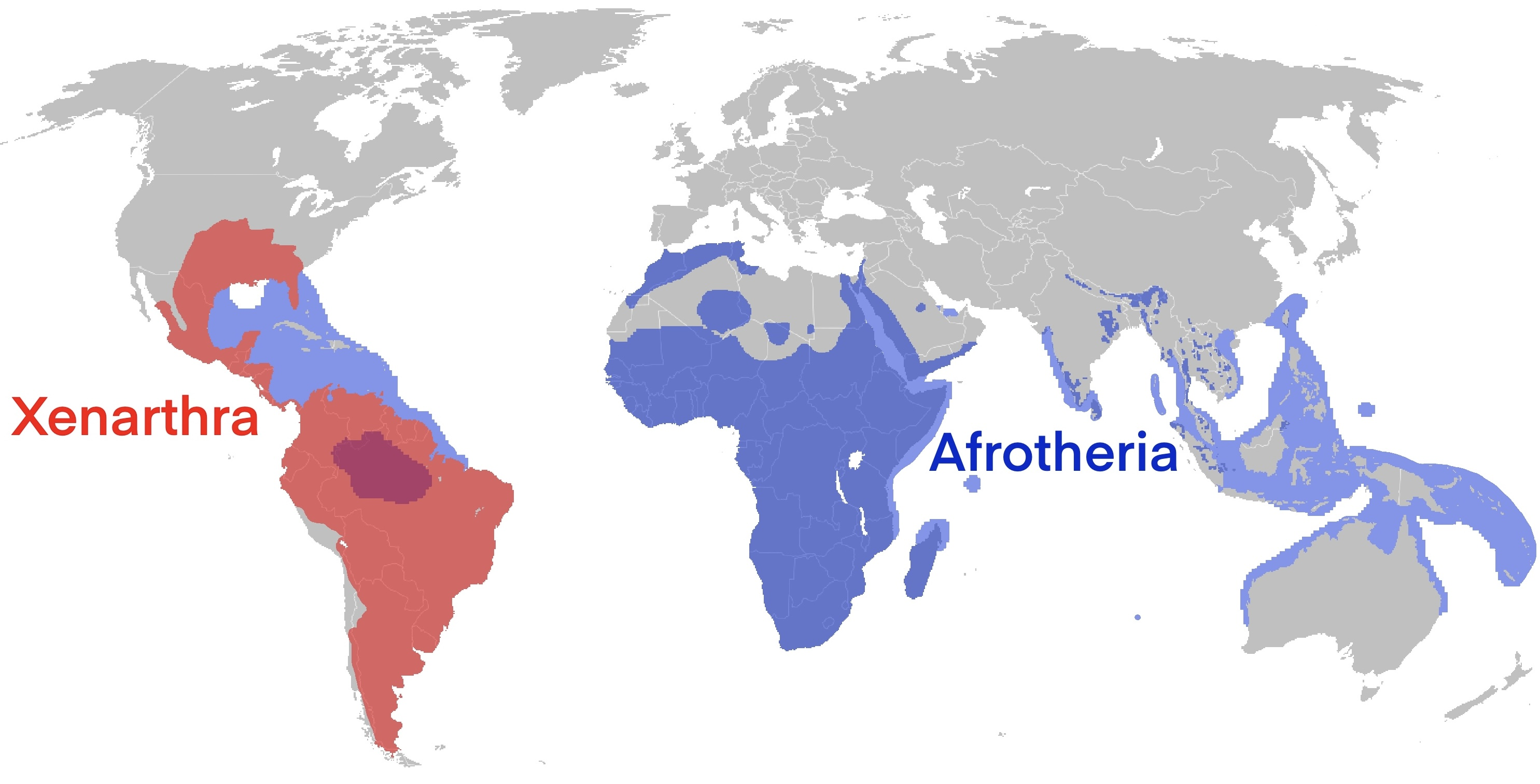

Synonyms
- Atlantogenta (Phillips, 2001); Notoplacentalia (Arnason, 2008); Xenafrotheria (Asher, 2005)

= Atlantogenata =

Atlantogenata Temporal range: Paleocene–Recent Possible Cretaceous origin

Magnorder of mammals

Atlantogenata ("born around the Atlantic Ocean") is a magnorder of placental mammals containing the cohorts or superorders Xenarthra and Afrotheria. These groups originated and radiated in the South American and African continents, respectively, presumably in the Cretaceous. Together with Boreoeutheria, they make up Placentalia. The monophyly of this grouping is supported by some genetic evidence.

Alternative hypotheses are that Boreoeutheria and Afrotheria combine to form Epitheria (as generally supported by anatomical and other physiological evidence) or that Boreoeutheria and Xenarthra combine to form Exafroplacentalia or Notolegia.

According to some studies, updated analysis of transposable element insertions around the time of divergence strongly supports the fourth hypothesis of a near-concomitant origin (trifurcation) of the three superorders of placental mammals: Afrotheria, Boreoeutheria, and Xenarthra. However, a 2016 analysis concluded such conflicting phylogenies were a consequence of poorly fitting evolutionary models, and that the Atlantogenata hypothesis is the best supported. Based on a molecular clock analysis, crown-group Atlantogenata was estimated to have diverged 84–97 million years ago.

- Placentalia
  - Atlantogenata
    - Xenarthra
    - Afrotheria
  - Boreoeutheria
    - Laurasiatheria
    - Euarchontoglires

Below shows the phylogeny of the extant atlantogenate families.

- Atlantogenata
  - Xenarthra
    - Cingulata
      - Dasypodidae
      - Chlamyphoridae
    - Pilosa
      - Vermilingua
        - Cyclopedidae
        - Myrmecophagidae
      - Folivora
        - Bradypodidae
        - Choloepodidae
  - Afrotheria
    - Paenungulata
      - Hyracoidea
        Procaviidae
      - Tethytheria
        - Sirenia
          - Trichechidae
          - Dugongidae
        - Proboscidea
          Elephantidae
    - Afroinsectiphilia
      - Tubulidentata
        Orycteropodidae
      - Afroinsectivora
        - Macroscelidea
          Macroscelididae
        - Afrosoricida
          - Chrysochloridae
          - Tenrecomorpha
            - Potamogalidae
            - Tenrecidae
