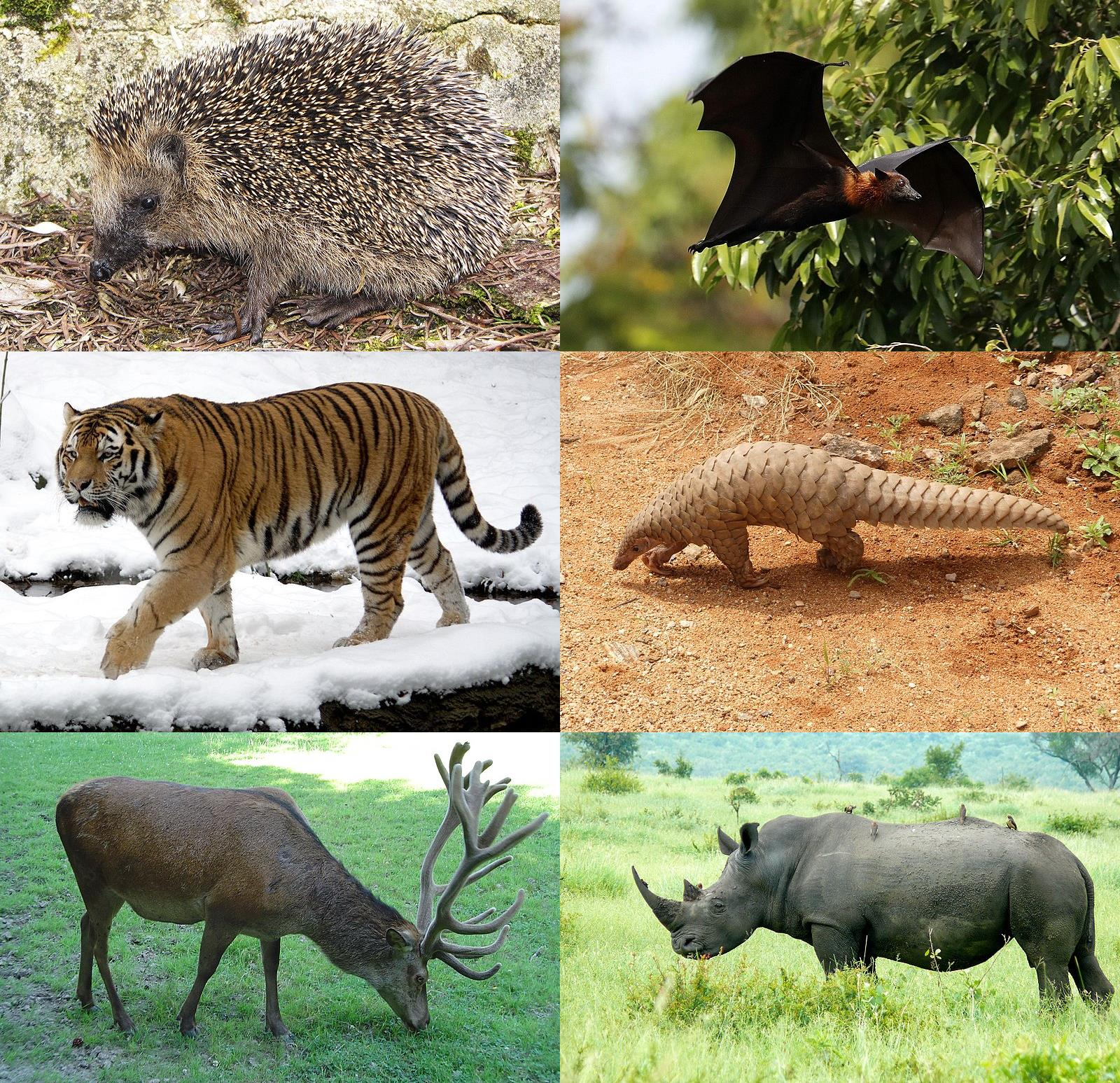
- From top to right: European hedgehog, Lyle's flying fox, Siberian tiger, Indian pangolin, red deer and white rhino. Representing the living orders: Eulipotyphla, Chiroptera, Carnivora, Pholidota, Artiodactyla and Perissodactyla, comprising Laurasiatheria.

Scientific classification
- Kingdom: Animalia
- Phylum: Chordata
- Class: Mammalia
- Infraclass: Placentalia
- Magnorder: Boreoeutheria
- Superorder: Laurasiatheria; Waddell et al., 1999

Subgroups
- Eulipotyphla (true insectivores); Scrotifera; Chiroptera (bats); Ferungulata; Ferae; Carnivora (cats, dogs, and relatives); Pholidota (pangolins); Euungulata; Artiodactyla (even-toed ungulates); Perissodactyla (odd-toed ungulates)

Synonyms
- Eurasiatheria (Matsui & Pyenson, 2023); Hoplopoda (Goldfuss, 1820); Laurasiaplacentalia (Arnason, 2008)

= Laurasiatheria =

Laurasiatheria Temporal range: 66.3–0 Ma Late Cretaceous to present

Superorder of mammals

Laurasiatheria (/lɔːrˌeɪʒəˈθɪəriə, -θɛriə/; "Laurasian beasts") is a superorder of placental mammals that groups together true insectivores (eulipotyphlans), bats (chiropterans), carnivorans, pangolins (pholidotes), even-toed ungulates (artiodactyls), odd-toed ungulates (perissodactyls), and all their extinct relatives (pan-euungulates). From systematics and phylogenetic perspectives, it is subdivided into order Eulipotyphla and clade Scrotifera. It is a sister group to Euarchontoglires with which it forms the magnorder Boreoeutheria. Laurasiatheria was discovered on the basis of the similar gene sequences shared by the mammals belonging to it; no anatomical features have yet been found that unite the group, although a few have been suggested such as a small coracoid process, a simplified hindgut (reversed in artiodactyls), high intelligence, lack of grasping hands (though mimicry of grasping is observed in felines) and allantoic vessels that are large to moderate in size. The Laurasiatheria clade is based on DNA sequence analyses and retrotransposon presence/absence data. The superorder originated on the northern supercontinent of Laurasia, after it split from Gondwana when Pangaea broke up. Its most recent common ancestor is supposed to have lived between ca. 76 to 90 million years ago.

== Etymology ==
The name of this superorder derives from its origin on the supercontinent of Laurasia. In contrast, extinct primitive mammals called Gondwanatheria existed in the supercontinent of Gondwana.

== Classification and phylogeny ==
=== History of phylogeny ===
Phylogenetic position of living laurasiatherians (in green) among placentals in a genus-level molecular phylogeny of 116 extant mammals inferred from the gene tree information of 14,509 coding DNA sequences. The other major clades are colored: marsupials (magenta), xenarthrans (orange), afrotherians (red), and Euarchontoglires (blue).

Uncertainty still exists regarding the phylogenetic tree for extant laurasiatherians, primarily due to disagreement about the placement of orders Chiroptera (bats) and Perissodactyla. Based on morphological grounds, bats had long been classified in the superorder Archonta (e.g. along with primates, treeshrews and the gliding colugos) until genetic research instead showed their kinship with the other laurasiatheres. The studies conflicted in terms of the exact placement of Chiroptera, however, with it being linked most closely to groups such as order Eulipotyphla in the clade Insectiphillia. Two 2013 studies retrieve that bats, pangolins, carnivorans and euungulates form a clade Scrotifera, indicating that Eulipotyphla might be the sister group to all other Laurasiatheria taxa.

=== Taxonomy ===
Former classification:	Current classification:
Superorder: Laurasiatheria (Waddell, 1999) (laurasian placental mammals); Grandorder: Ferungulata (Simpson, 1945); Mirorder: Euungulata (Waddell, 2001) (true ungulates); Mirorder: Ferae (Linnaeus, 1758); Clade: Insectiphillia (Waddell, 2001); Order: Chiroptera (Blumenbach, 1779) (bats); Order: Eulipotyphla (Waddell, 1999) (true insectivores)	Superorder: Laurasiatheria (Waddell, 1999) (laurasian placental mammals); Order: Eulipotyphla (Waddell, 1999) (true insectivores); Clade: Scrotifera (Waddell, 1999); Grandorder: Ferungulata (Simpson, 1945); Clade: Apo-Chiroptera (Cirranello, Simmons & Gunnell, 2020) (bats); Family: †Eosoricodontidae (Lopatin, 2005); Genus: †Acmeodon (Matthew & Granger, 1921); Genus: †Avunculus (Van Valen, 1966); Genus: †Gelastops (Simpson, 1935); Incertae sedis: †"Wyonycteris" microtis (Secord, 2008)

=== Phylogeny ===
The phylogenetic relationships of superorder Laurasiatheria are shown in the following cladogram, reconstructed from mitochondrial and nuclear DNA and protein characters, as well as the fossil record.

- Placentalia
  - - - - †Taeniodonta
        - †Alveugena
      - †Procerberinae
    - †Ambilestes
  - †Palaeoryctida
  - Atlantogenata
  - Boreoeutheria
    - Euarchontoglires
    - ?
      †Veratalpa
    - Laurasiatheria
      - Eulipotyphla
      - Scrotifera
        - - Apo-Chiroptera
          - †"Wyonycteris" microtis
          - †Eosoricodontidae
        - Ferungulata
        - - †Acmeodon
          - - †Avunculus
            - †Gelastops

== See also ==
- Mammal classification
- Boreoeutheria
- Gondwanatheria – a clade of mammaliaforms named after supercontinent of Gondwana
