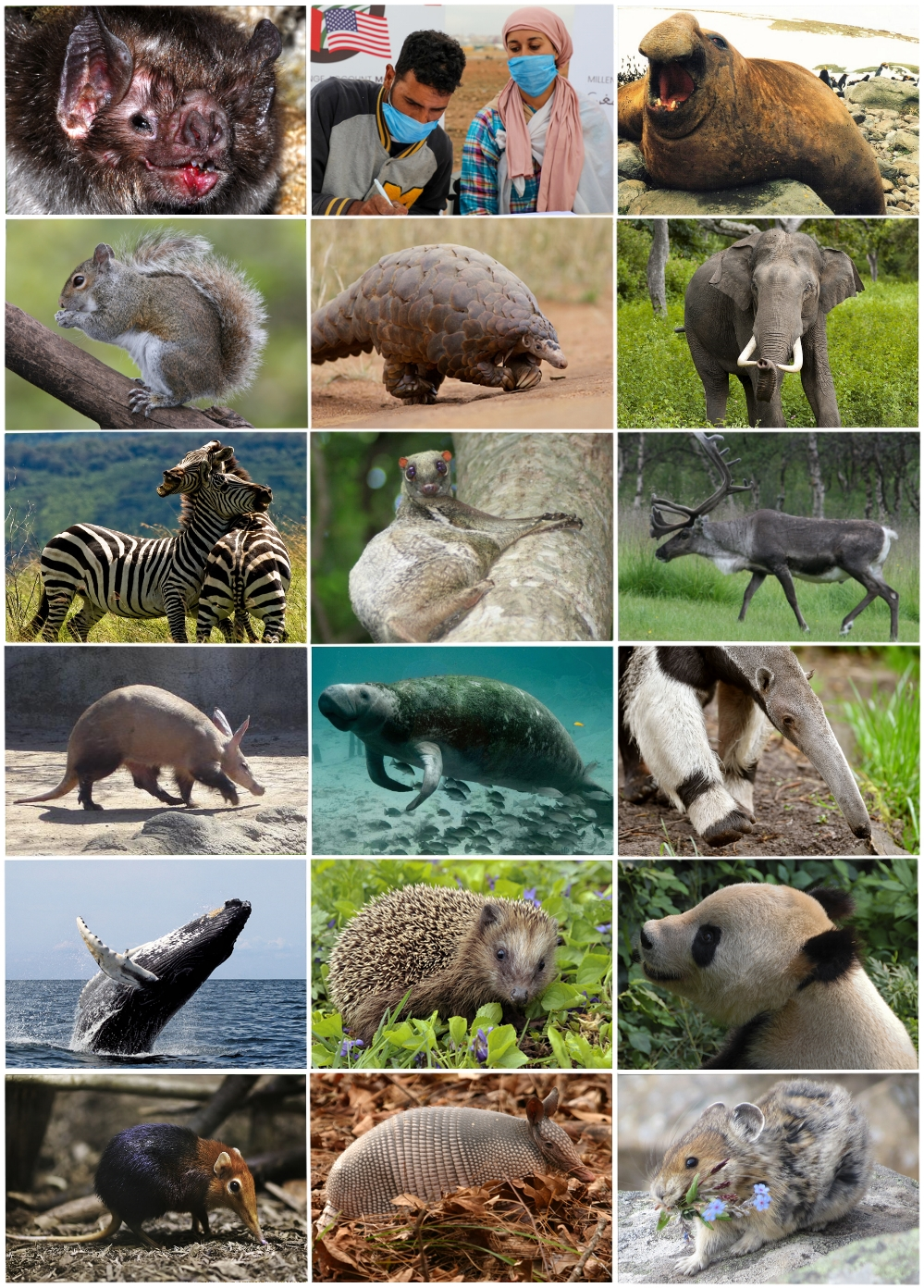
- Placentals from different orders.

Scientific classification
- Kingdom: Animalia
- Phylum: Chordata
- Class: Mammalia
- Clade: Eutheria
- Infraclass: Placentalia; Owen, 1837

Magnorders and possible taxa
- Atlantogenata; Boreoeutheria; †Leptictimorpha (?); †Leptictida (?); †Palaeoryctida (?); †Taeniodonta (?) (Note: Genera Alveugena, Ambilestes and Procerberus are the immediate outgroups to order Taeniodonta, with genera Alveugena and Procerberus classified as a close sister taxa to this order.); †Procerberinae (?); †Alveugena (?); †Ambilestes (?)

Synonyms
- List of synonyms: Euplacentalia (Koenigswald, 2016); Eutheria (Huxley, 1880); Monodelphia (Gill, 1872); Placentaria (Fleming, 1822); Placentata (Turnbull, 1971)

= Placentalia =

Placental mammals Temporal range: Maastrichtian-present 67.3–0 Ma Possible earlier Cretaceous records

Infraclass of mammals in the clade Eutheria

Placentalia (/plæsənˈteɪliə/) is one of the three extant subdivisions of the class Mammalia, the other two being Monotremata and Marsupialia. Placentalia contains the vast majority of extant mammals, which are partly distinguished from monotremes and marsupials in that the fetus is carried in the uterus of its mother to a relatively late stage of development. The name is something of a misnomer, considering that marsupials also nourish their fetuses via a placenta, though for a relatively briefer period, giving birth to less-developed young, which are then nurtured for a period inside the mother's pouch. Placentalia represents the only living group within Eutheria, which contains all mammals that are more closely related to placentals than they are to marsupials.

== Anatomical features ==
Placental mammals are anatomically distinguished from other mammals by:

- a sufficiently wide opening at the bottom of the pelvis to allow the birth of a large baby relative to the size of the mother.
- the absence of epipubic bones extending forward from the pelvis, which are found in all other mammals. (Their function in non-placental mammals is to stiffen the body during locomotion, but in placentals they would inhibit the expansion of the abdomen during pregnancy.)
- the rearmost bones of the foot fit into a socket formed by the ends of the tibia and fibula, forming a complete mortise and tenon upper ankle joint.
- the presence of a malleolus at the bottom of the fibula.
- instead of a cloaca (Note: Exceptional adult placentals that retain a cloaca are golden moles, tenrecs, beavers, and some shrews.) like monotremes, marsupials and most other vertebrates, the urogenital ducts exit through the vulva or penis and the rectum opens as the anus.
- the presence of a corpus callosum in between the cerebral hemispheres.
- The loss of a premolar tooth in the lower jaw relative to more primitive eutherians (suggested to be the centrally placed third premolar), bringing the premolar count to four in each half of the lower jaw.

== Subdivisions ==
Analysis of molecular data led to rapid changes in assessments of the phylogeny of placental orders at the close of the 20th century. A novel phylogeny and classification of placental orders appeared with Waddell, Hasegawa and Okada in 1999. "Jumping genes"-type retroposon presence/absence patterns have provided corroboration of phylogenetic relationships inferred from molecular sequences. It is now widely accepted that there are three major subdivisions or lineages of placental mammals: Boreoeutheria, Xenarthra, and Afrotheria. All of these diverged from common ancestors.

2022 studies of Bertrand, O. C. and Sarah L. Shelley have identified leptictids, palaeoryctids and taeniodonts as basal placental mammal clades. Leptictids were also proposed to be close relatives of Boreoeutheria.

The 19 living orders of Placentalia in the three groups are:

- Magnorder Atlantogenata
  - Superorder Xenarthra
    - Order Cingulata (armadillos)
    - Order Pilosa (sloths and anteaters)
  - Superorder Afrotheria
    - Grandorder Afroinsectiphilia
      - Order Tubulidentata (aardvarks)
      - Mirorder Afroinsectivora
        - Order Afrosoricida (tenrecs, otter shrews, and golden moles)
        - Order Macroscelidea (elephant shrews)
    - Grandorder Paenungulata
      - Order Hyracoidea (hyraxes)
      - Mirorder Tethytheria
        - Order Proboscidea (elephants)
        - Order Sirenia (dugongs and manatees)
- Magnorder Boreoeutheria
  - Superorder Euarchontoglires
    - Grandorder Gliriformes
      - Mirorder Glires
        - Order Lagomorpha (rabbits, hares, and pikas)
        - Order Rodentia (rodents: mice, rats, hamsters, guinea pigs, chinchillas, capybaras, porcupines, voles, squirrels, beavers, etc.)
    - Grandorder Euarchonta
      - Order Scandentia (treeshrews)
      - Mirorder Primatomorpha
        - Order Dermoptera (colugos)
        - Order Primates (primates: monkeys, apes (including humans), lemurs, lorisids, galagos, and tarsiers)
  - Superorder Laurasiatheria
    - Order Eulipotyphla (hedgehogs, gymnures, shrews, moles, and solenodons)
    - Order Chiroptera (bats)
    - Grandorder Ferungulata
      - Mirorder Euungulata
        - Order Artiodactyla (even-toed ungulates: cattle, antelopes, sheep, deer, camelids, pigs, giraffes, cetaceans, hippopotamuses, goats, buffalo, etc.)
        - Order Perissodactyla (odd-toed ungulates: horses, asses, zebras, rhinoceroses, and tapirs)
      - Mirorder Ferae
        - Order Pholidota (pangolins)
        - Order Carnivora (carnivorans: dogs, cats, bears, pinnipeds, mongooses, raccoons, skunks, hyenas, weasels, etc.)

The exact relationships among these three lineages is currently a subject of debate, and four different hypotheses have been proposed with respect to which group is basal or diverged first from other placentals. These hypotheses are Atlantogenata (basal Boreoeutheria), Epitheria (basal Xenarthra), Exafroplacentalia (basal Afrotheria) and a hypothesis supporting a near simultaneous divergence. Estimates for the divergence times among these three placental groups mostly range from 105 to 120 million years ago (MYA), depending on the type of DNA, whether it is translated, and the phylogenetic method (e.g. nuclear or mitochondrial), and varying interpretations of paleogeographic data. In addition, a strict molecular clock does not hold, so it is necessary to assume models of how evolutionary rates change along lineages. These assumptions alone can make substantial differences to the relative ages of different mammal groups estimated with genomic data.

- Placentalia
  - Atlantogenata
    - Xenarthra
    - Afrotheria
  - Boreoeutheria
    - Euarchontoglires
      - Glires
      - Euarchonta
    - Laurasiatheria
      - Eulipotyphla
      - Scrotifera
        - Chiroptera
        - Ferungulata
          - Ferae
            - Pholidota
            - Carnivora
          - Euungulata
            - Perissodactyla
            - Artiodactyla

Cladogram and classification based on Amrine-Madsen, H. et al.. (2003) and Asher, R. J. et al.. (2009) Compare with Waddell, Hasegawa and Okada (1999) and Waddell et al. (2001).

== Genomics ==
As of 2020, the genome has been sequenced for at least one species in each extant placental order and in 83% of families (105 of 127 extant placental families).

See list of sequenced animal genomes.

== Evolutionary history ==
True placental mammals (the crown group including all modern placentals) arose from stem-group members of the clade Eutheria, which had existed since at least the Middle Jurassic epoch, about 170 mya. These early eutherians were small, nocturnal insect eaters, with adaptations for life in trees.

True placentals may have originated in the Late Cretaceous around 90 mya, but the earliest undisputed fossils are dated to the Cretaceous–Paleogene boundary (K-Pg boundary). The genus Protungulatum is sometimes placed as a stem-ungulate, with probably the earliest known species P. coombsi from the strata within the Hell Creek Formation specifically dated to at least 300,000 years before the K-Pg boundary. The genus Purgatorius, sometimes considered a stem-primate, appears no more than 300,000 years after the K-Pg boundary. One study has recovered both genera to be closely related and as stem-eutherians outside modern placental mammals, but others have recovered Protungulatum as a pan-euungulate based on phylogenetic analysis and inner ear anatomy different from non-placentals. The rapid appearance of placentals after the mass extinction at the end of the Cretaceous suggests that the group had already originated and undergone an initial diversification in the Late Cretaceous, as suggested by molecular clocks. The lineages leading to Xenarthra and Afrotheria probably originated around 90 mya, and Boreoeutheria underwent an initial diversification around 70-80 mya, producing the lineages that eventually would lead to modern primates, rodents, insectivores, artiodactyls, and carnivorans.

However, modern members of the placental orders originated in the Paleogene around 66 to 23 mya, following the Cretaceous–Paleogene extinction event. The evolution of crown orders such modern primates, rodents, and carnivores appears to be part of an adaptive radiation that took place as mammals quickly evolved to take advantage of ecological niches that were left open when most dinosaurs and other animals disappeared following the Chicxulub asteroid impact. As they occupied new niches, mammals rapidly increased in body size, and began to take over the large herbivore and large carnivore niches that had been left open by the decimation of the dinosaurs (and perhaps more relevantly competing synapsids). Mammals also exploited niches that the non-avian dinosaurs had never touched: for example, bats evolved flight and echolocation, allowing them to be highly effective nocturnal, aerial insectivores; and whales first occupied freshwater lakes and rivers and then moved into the oceans. Primates, meanwhile, acquired specialized grasping hands and feet which allowed them to grasp branches, and large eyes with keener vision which allowed them to forage in the dark.

The evolution of land placentals followed different pathways on different continents since they cannot easily cross large bodies of water. An exception is smaller placentals such as rodents and primates, who left Laurasia and colonized Africa and then South America via rafting.

In Africa, the Afrotheria underwent a major adaptive radiation, which led to elephants, elephant shrews, tenrecs, golden moles, aardvarks, and manatees. In South America a similar event occurred, with radiation of the Xenarthra, which led to modern sloths, anteaters, and armadillos, as well as the extinct ground sloths and glyptodonts. Expansion in Laurasia was dominated by Boreoeutheria, which includes primates and rodents, insectivores, carnivores, perissodactyls and artiodactyls. These groups expanded beyond a single continent when land bridges formed linking Africa to Eurasia and South America to North America.

A study on eutherian diversity suggests that placental diversity was constrained during the Paleocene, while multituberculate mammals diversified; afterwards, multituberculates decline and placentals explode in diversity.
