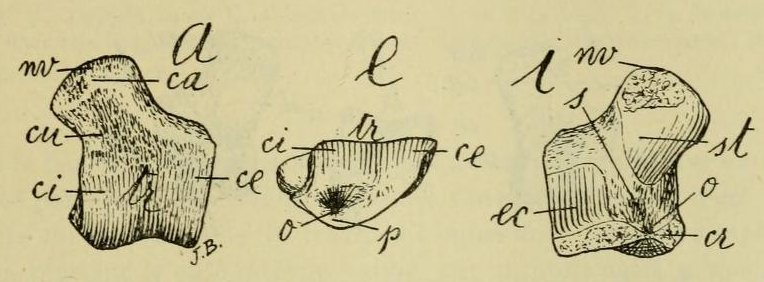
- astragalus of Veratalpa lugdunensiana, seen from above (a), the back (e), and below (i)

Scientific classification
- Kingdom: Animalia
- Phylum: Chordata
- Class: Mammalia
- Infraclass: Placentalia
- Magnorder: Boreoeutheria
- Genus: †Veratalpa; Ameghino, 1905

Type species
- †Veratalpa lugdunensiana Ameghino, 1905

Synonyms
- synonyms of species: V. lugdunensiana: Veratalpa lugdunensis (Trouessart, 1906)

= Veratalpa =

Veratalpa Temporal range: 16.9–13.7 Ma Early to Middle Miocene

Genus of mammals

Veratalpa ("true mole") is an extinct genus of placental mammals of uncertain affinities, that lived in France from the early to middle Miocene. It is a monotypic genus with only one species, Veratalpa lugdunensiana, known from a single fossil of ankle bone.

== Taxonomy ==
In a 1905, the Argentine naturalist Florentino Ameghino described Veratalpa in an overview of the ankle boned from the early to middle Miocene of Vieux Collonges in France. He listed several species of the family Talpidae (moles and related species) from Vieux Collonges, including "species C", which he named as a new genus and species, Veratalpa lugdunensiana, in a footnote. In a 1906 review of Ameghino's paper, Édouard Louis Trouessart affirmed that Veratalpa probably represented a new genus of mole, but noted that the specific name lugdunensiana would have been more correctly written "lugdunensis". According to Trouessart, the suffix -ana is appropriate for names that reference persons, but not for those that refer to places, such as this name, which is derived from Lugdunum (the Latin name for Lyon).

In a 1974 review of Miocene European talpids, John Howard Hutchison wrote that the astragalus of Veratalpa lacked any features that would ally it with talpids and commented that it most likely came from a rodent.

In their 1997 Classification of Mammals, Malcolm McKenna and Susan Bell listed Veratalpa as a member of Placentalia, with uncertain affinities.

== Description ==
The astragalus of Veratalpa is the largest among those from Vieux Collonges that Ameghino assigned to Talpidae. Although at 4.5 mm it is about as long as his "species A", it is broader, and Hutchison noted the broadness as one of the characters that argue against classification of Veratalpa in Talpidae. Like living moles, it has a broad, flat, and short head, but it forms a noticeably small angle with the body. In actual moles, the head is more axially oriented (i.e., towards the central axis of the foot). The surface of the head that contacts the navicular bone is less rounded than in moles. The body is low and nearly square and has a diameter of about 3 mm. The trochlea—a surface on the body of the bone that articulates with the tibia (lower leg bone)—is not large and pulley-like, as in talpids. There is a small perforation on the lower side of the body. This perforation is larger in Ameghino's other supposed talpids, and Trouessart suggested on the basis of this feature that the internal parts of the toes were reduced in Veratalpa.

== Distribution ==
Veratalpa is known only from the locality of Vieux Collonges near Lyon in southeastern France; Ameghino knew this locality as "Mont-Ceindre". This rich fissure filling locality has yielded thousands of fossils and is currently dated to the early-middle Miocene boundary, around 17 million years ago (MN 4/5 in the MN zonation). As Veratalpa is known from a single astragalus, Ameghino considered it to be rare. He distinguished six talpid species among the astragali, but according to Hutchison only Ameghino's species F (which was assigned to Talpidae with a query) is really a talpid.
