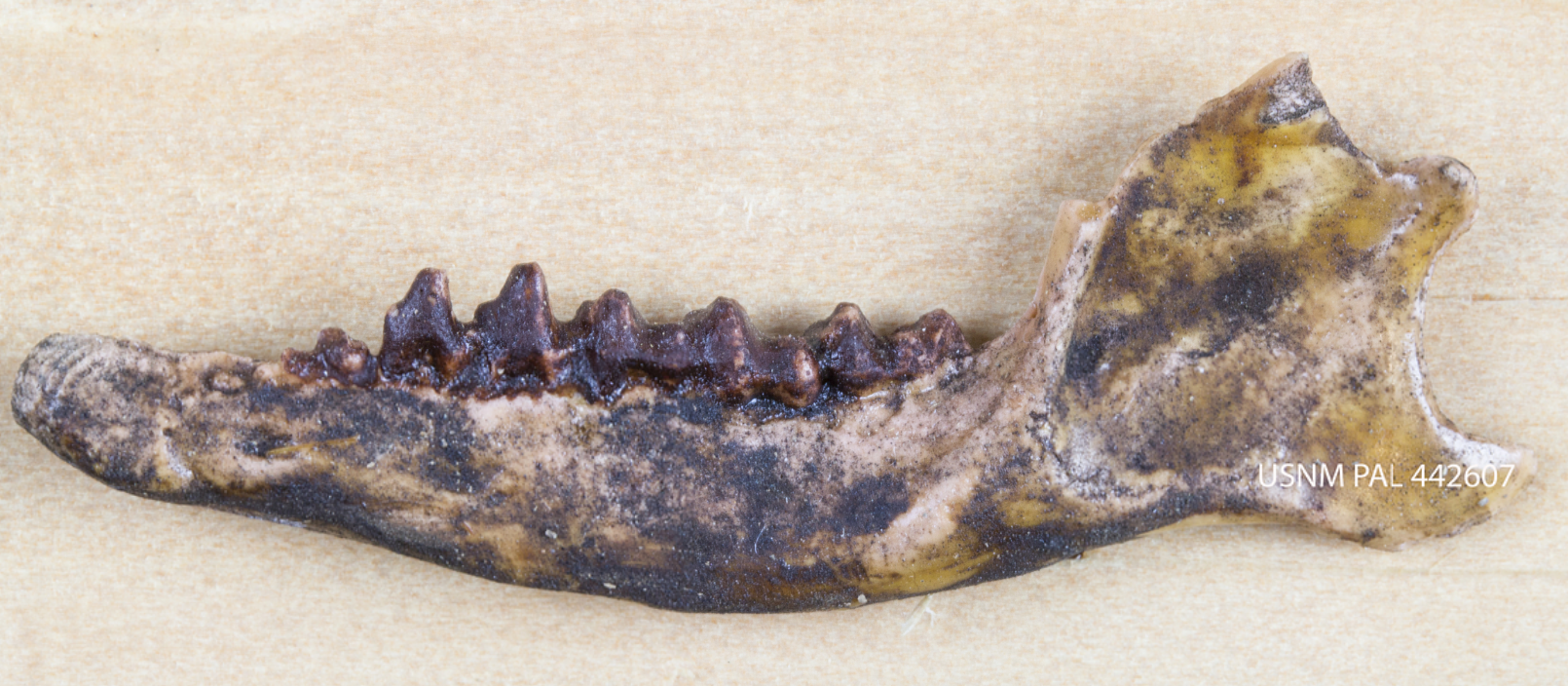
- A lower jaw of Protungulatum donnae from the Hell Creek Formation of Montana

Scientific classification
- Kingdom: Animalia
- Phylum: Chordata
- Class: Mammalia
- Grandorder: Ferungulata
- Clade: Pan-Euungulata
- Family: †Protungulatidae; Chatterjee, Scotese & Bajpai, 2017
- Genus: †Protungulatum; Sloan & Van Valen, 1965

Type species
- †Protungulatum donnae Sloan & Van Valen, 1965

Species
- †P. coombsi (Archibald, Zhang, Harper & Cifelli, 2011); †P. donnae (Sloan & Van Valen, 1965); †P. gorgun (Van Valen, 1978); †P. mckeeveri (Archibald, 1982); †P. sloani (Van Valen, 1978)

= Protungulatum =

Protungulatum Temporal range: 70.6–63.8 Ma Late Maastrichtian to Puercan

Extinct genus of mammals

Protungulatum ('first ungulate') is an extinct genus of eutherian mammals within extinct family Protungulatidae, and is possibly one of the earliest known placental mammals in the fossil record, that lived in North America from the Late Cretaceous to early Paleocene.

== Discovery ==
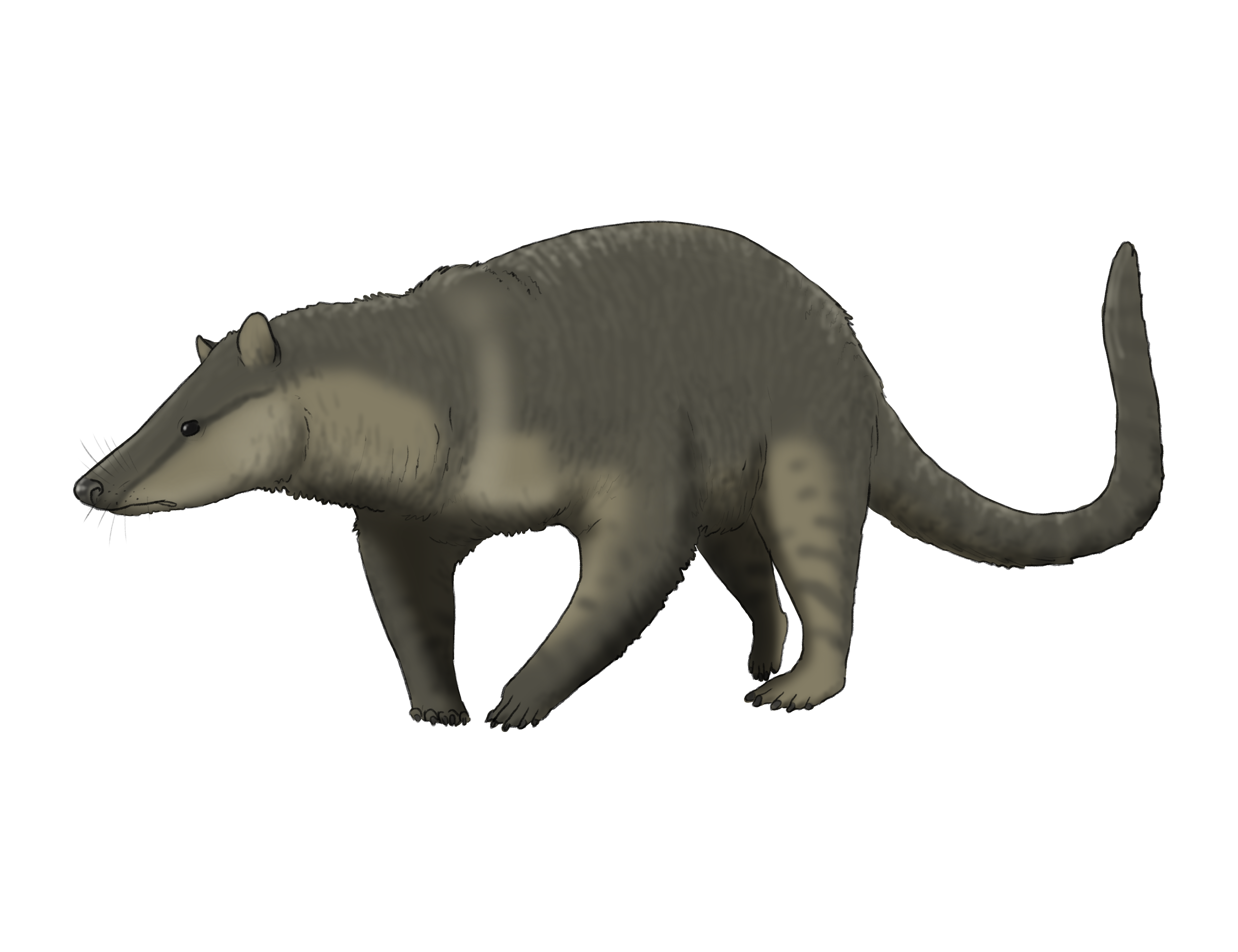
Speculative life reconstruction

Fossils of this genus were first found in the Bug Creek Anthills, a site in northeastern Montana from the uppermost Hell Creek Formation. The Bug Creek Anthills were initially believed to be Late Cretaceous (latest Maastrichtian) because of the presence of the remains of non-avian dinosaurs and common Cretaceous mammals. These fossils were later shown to have been reworked (Note: A derived or reworked fossil is a fossil found in rock made significantly later than when the fossilized animal or plant died: it happens when a hard fossil is freed from a soft rock formation by erosion and redeposited in a currently forming sedimentary deposit.) from Late Cretaceous strata, and consequently the Bug Creek Anthills are currently believed to be Early Paleocene (Puercan) in age.

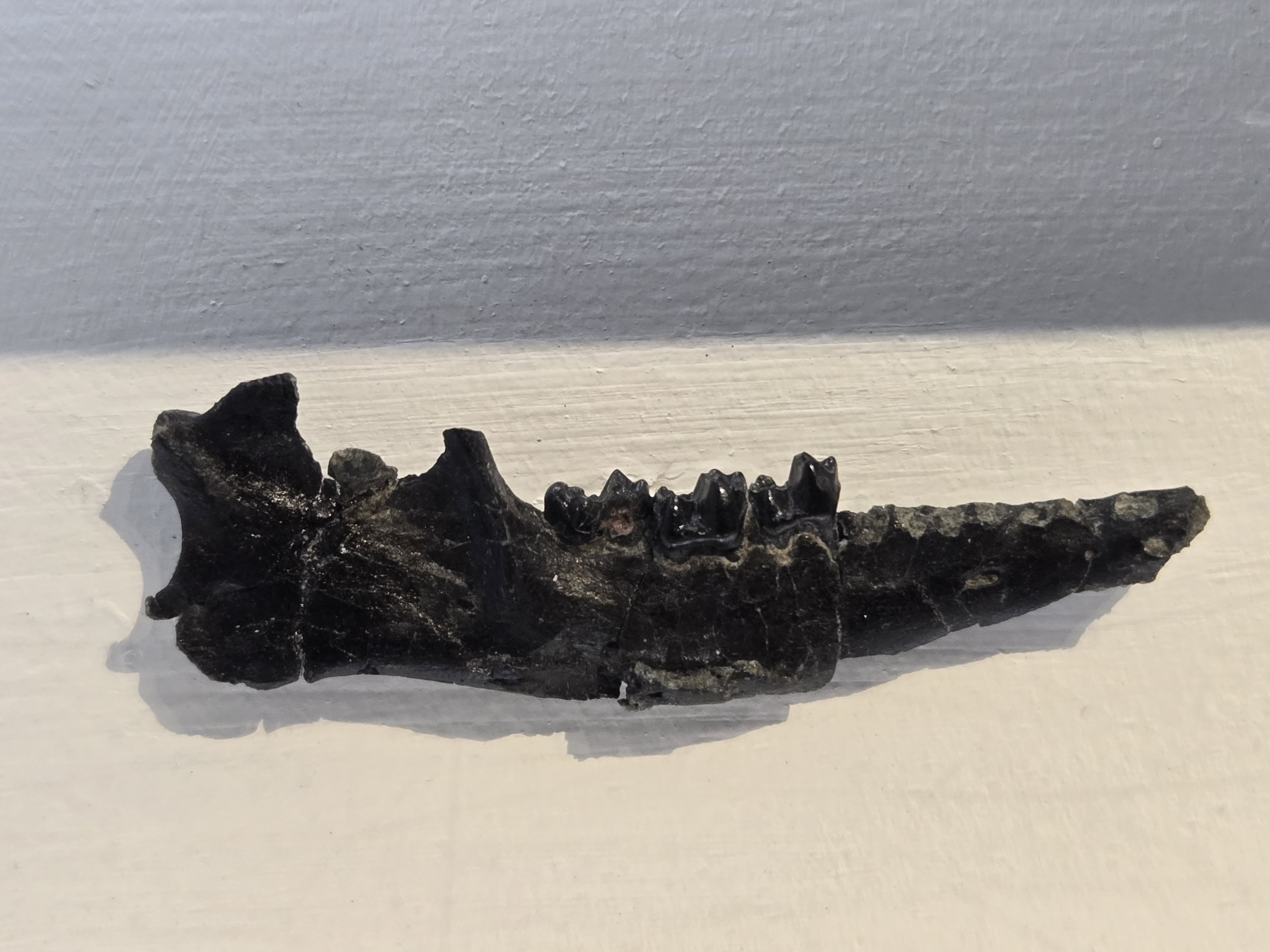
A partial jaw of P. donnae from the Willow Creek Formation of Alberta

Remains from the Ravenscrag Formation of Saskatchewan, Canada have been assigned to Protungulatum donnae. These remains may also be Cretaceous in age, but the age of the Ravenscrag Formation is not entirely certain. In 2011, a new species Protungulatum coombsi was named based on fossil material discovered from slightly older strata within the Hell Creek Formation, specifically dated to at least 300,000 years before the K-Pg extinction. It suggests that Protungulatum was present in both the latest Cretaceous and the early Paleocene. P. coombsi was estimated to be 20% larger than the next largest Paleocene species.

== Classification ==
Studies differ on the placement of Protungulatum. This genus was initially assigned to the family Arctocyonidae, in order Condylarthra, (a group of archaic "ungulates", that is now known to be polyphyletic). Some found that it is not a true placental mammal, rather a eutherian close to Placentalia. However, a number of studies consider to support it as a placental mammal and relative to true ungulates in the clade Pan-Euungulata. Its inner ear anatomy was one avenue supporting a relationship to ungulates.

Kharmerungulatum, a mammal from the Late Cretaceous Intertrappean Beds of India, may be a close relative of Protungulatum.

The phylogenetic relationships of genus Protungulatum are shown in the following cladogram.

- Scrotifera
  - - Apo-Chiroptera
    - †"Wyonycteris" microtis
    - †Eosoricodontidae
  - - †Acmeodon
    - †Gelastops
  - Ferungulata
    - Ferae
    - Pan-Euungulata (Euungulata [sensu lato])
      - Euungulata (sensu stricto)
      - †Protungulatidae
        - †Protungulatum
          - †Protungulatum coombsi
          - †Protungulatum gorgun
          - - †Protungulatum donnae
            - †Protungulatum mckeeveri
            - †Protungulatum sloani
            - ?
              †Protungulatum sp. (PTRM 1277)
