= Order (taxonomy) =

Taxonomic rank between class and family

The hierarchy of biological classification's eight major taxonomic ranks. Intermediate minor rankings are not shown.

Order (Latin: ordo) is one of the eight major hierarchical taxonomic ranks in Linnaean taxonomy. It is classified between family and class. Like the other ranks, orders reflect shared ancestry; for example, all owls belong to the order Strigiformes. In biological classification systems, orders and their usage are defined by nomenclature codes. An immediately higher rank, superorder, is sometimes added directly above order, with suborder directly beneath order.

What does and does not belong to each order is determined by a taxonomist, as is whether a particular order should be recognized at all. Often there is no exact agreement, with different taxonomists each taking a different position. There are no hard rules that a taxonomist needs to follow in describing or recognizing an order. Some taxa are accepted almost universally, while others are recognized only rarely.

The name of an order is usually written with a capital letter. For some groups of organisms, their orders may follow consistent naming schemes. Orders of plants, fungi, and algae use the suffix -ales (e.g. Dictyotales). Orders of birds and fishes use the Latin suffix -iformes meaning 'having the form of' (e.g. Passeriformes), most orders of insects use the suffix -ptera meaning 'wing', but orders of mammals, reptiles, amphibians and invertebrates are not so consistent (e.g. Artiodactyla, Anura, Crocodylia, Actiniaria, Primates).

== Hierarchy of ranks ==
=== Zoology ===
For some clades covered by the International Code of Zoological Nomenclature, several additional classifications are sometimes used, although not all of these are officially recognized.

| Name | Latin prefix | Examples |
|---|---|---|
| Magnorder | magnus, 'large, great, important' | Boreoeutheria, Atlantogenata |
| Superorder | super, 'above' | Euarchontoglires, Laurasiatheria, Afrotheria |
| Grandorder | grandis, 'large' | Euarchonta, Ferungulata |
| Mirorder | mirus, 'wonderful, strange' | Primatomorpha, Ferae, Euungulata |
| Order | | Primates, Procolophonomorpha, Carnivora, Artiodactyla, Pilosa |
| Suborder | sub, 'under' | Haplorrhini, Procolophonia, Whippomorpha, Vermilingua |
| Infraorder | infra, 'below' | Simiiformes, Tarsiiformes, Cetacea |
| Parvorder | parvus, 'small, unimportant' | Catarrhini, Odontoceti, Mysticeti |

In their 1997 classification of mammals, McKenna and Bell used two extra levels between superorder and order: grandorder and mirorder. Michael Novacek (1986) inserted them at the same position. Michael Benton (2005) inserted them between superorder and grandorder instead. This position was adopted by Systema Naturae 2000 and others.

=== Botany ===
In botany, the ranks of subclass and suborder are secondary ranks pre-defined as respectively above and below the rank of order. Any number of further ranks can be used as long as they are clearly defined.

The superorder rank is commonly used, with the ending -anae that was initiated by Armen Takhtajan's publications from 1966 onwards.

== History ==
The order as a distinct rank of biological classification having its own distinctive name (and not just called a higher genus (genus summum)) was first introduced by the German botanist Augustus Quirinus Rivinus in his classification of plants that appeared in a series of treatises in the 1690s. Carl Linnaeus was the first to apply it consistently to the division of all three kingdoms of nature (then minerals, plants, and animals) in his Systema Naturae (1735, 1st. Ed.).

=== Botany ===
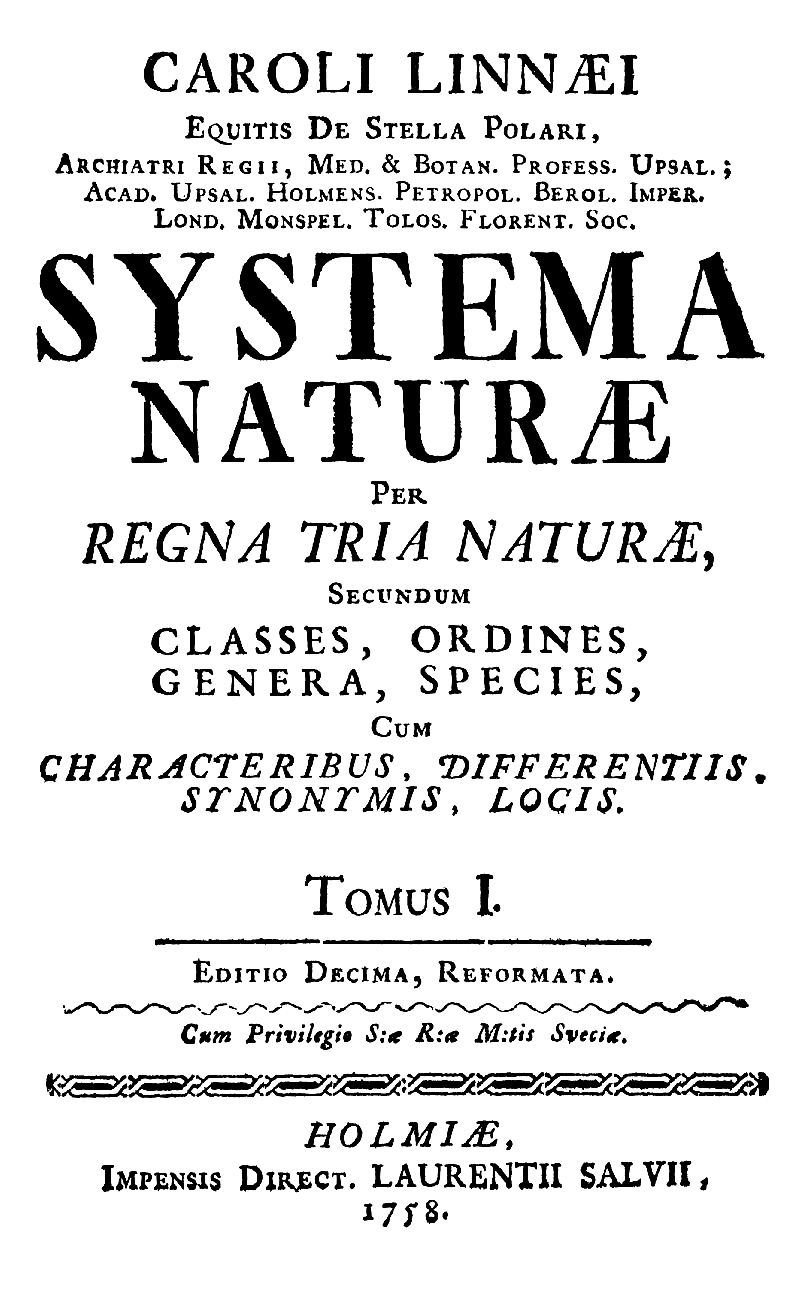
Title page of the 1758 edition of Linnaeus's Systema Naturæ.

For plants, Linnaeus' orders in the Systema Naturae and the Species Plantarum were strictly artificial, introduced to subdivide the artificial classes into more comprehensible smaller groups. When the word ordo was first consistently used for natural units of plants, in 19th-century works such as the Prodromus Systematis Naturalis Regni Vegetabilis of Augustin Pyramus de Candolle and the Genera Plantarum of Bentham & Hooker, it indicated taxa that are now given the rank of family (see ordo naturalis, 'natural order').

In French botanical publications, from Michel Adanson's Familles naturelles des plantes (1763) and until the end of the 19th century, the word famille (plural: familles) was used as a French equivalent for this Latin ordo. This equivalence was explicitly stated in the Alphonse Pyramus de Candolle's Lois de la nomenclature botanique (1868), the precursor of the currently used International Code of Nomenclature for algae, fungi, and plants.

In the first international Rules of botanical nomenclature from the International Botanical Congress of 1905, the word family (familia) was assigned to the rank indicated by the French famille, while order (ordo) was reserved for a higher rank, for what in the 19th century had often been named a 'cohort' (cohors, plural cohortes).

Some of the plant families still retain the names of Linnaean "natural orders" or even the names of pre-Linnaean natural groups recognized by Linnaeus as orders in his natural classification (e.g. Palmae or Labiatae). Such names are known as descriptive family names.

=== Zoology ===
In the field of zoology, the Linnaean orders were used more consistently. That is, the orders in the zoology part of the Systema Naturae refer to natural groups. Some of his ordinal names are still in use, e.g. Lepidoptera (moths and butterflies) and Diptera (flies, mosquitoes, midges, and gnats).

=== Virology ===
From 1991 to 2017, order was the highest rank used to classify viruses in a system that ranged from order to species. In 2018, the International Committee on Taxonomy of Viruses, which oversees virus taxonomy, added ranks higher than order up to the highest taxonomic rank of realm. Virus orders are indicated by the suffix -virales.

== See also ==
- Cladistics
- Phylogenetics
- Systematics
- Taxonomic rank
- Taxonomy
- Virus classification

== Works cited ==
- McNeill, J.; Barrie, F.R.; Buck, W.R.; Demoulin, V.; Greuter, W.; Hawksworth, D.L.; Herendeen, P.S.; Knapp, S.; Marhold, K.; Prado, J.; Prud'homme Van Reine, W.F.; Smith, G.F.; Wiersema, J.H.; Turland, N.J. (2012). International Code of Nomenclature for algae, fungi, and plants (Melbourne Code) adopted by the Eighteenth International Botanical Congress Melbourne, Australia, July 2011. Regnum Vegetabile. Vol. 154. A.R.G. Gantner Verlag KG. ISBN 978-3-87429-425-6.
