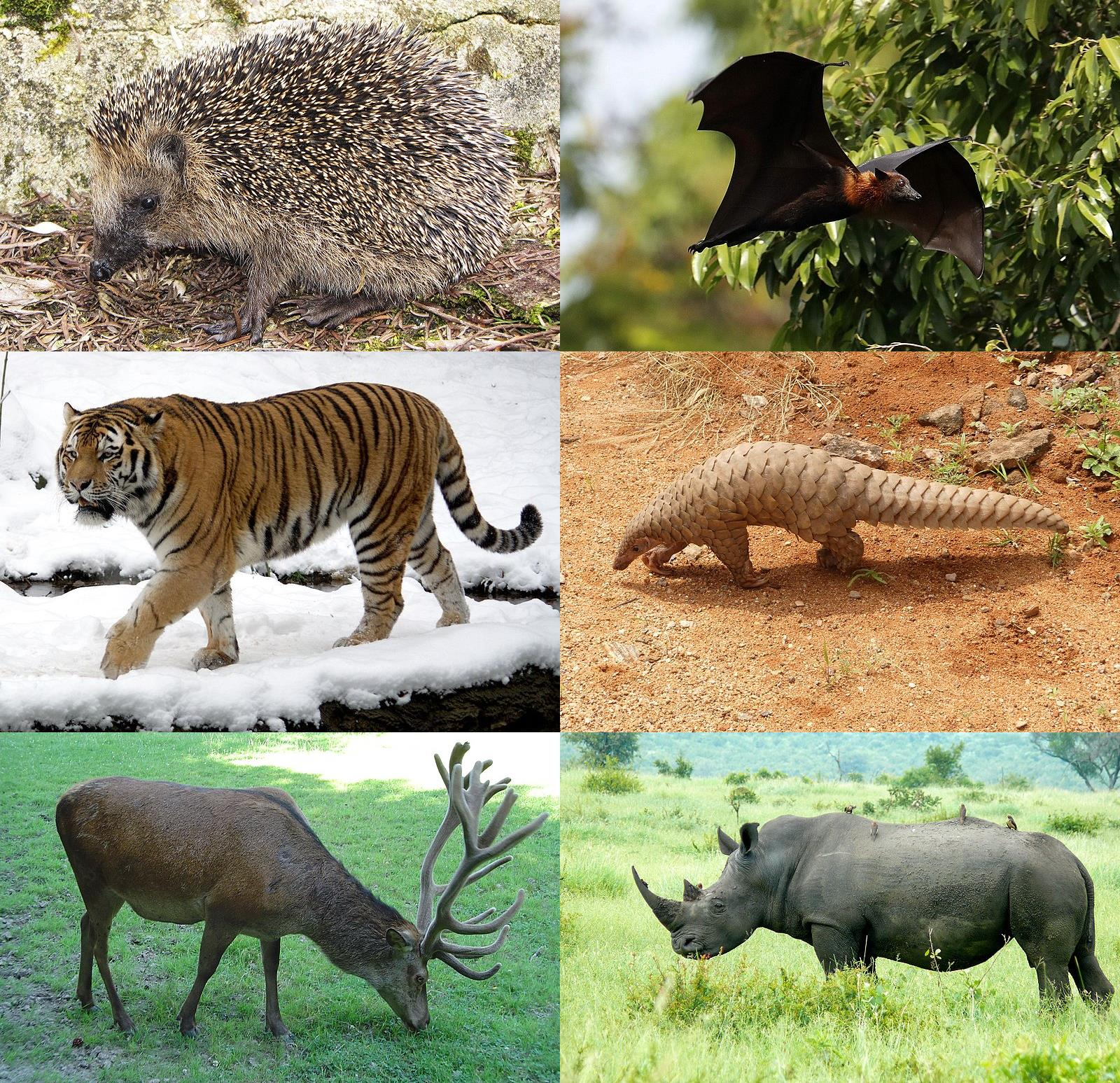
- From top to right: European hedgehog, Lyle's flying fox, tiger, Indian pangolin, red deer and white rhino. Representing the orders: Eulipotyphla, Chiroptera, Carnivora, Pholidota, Artiodactyla and Perissodactyla, comprising Laurasiatheria.
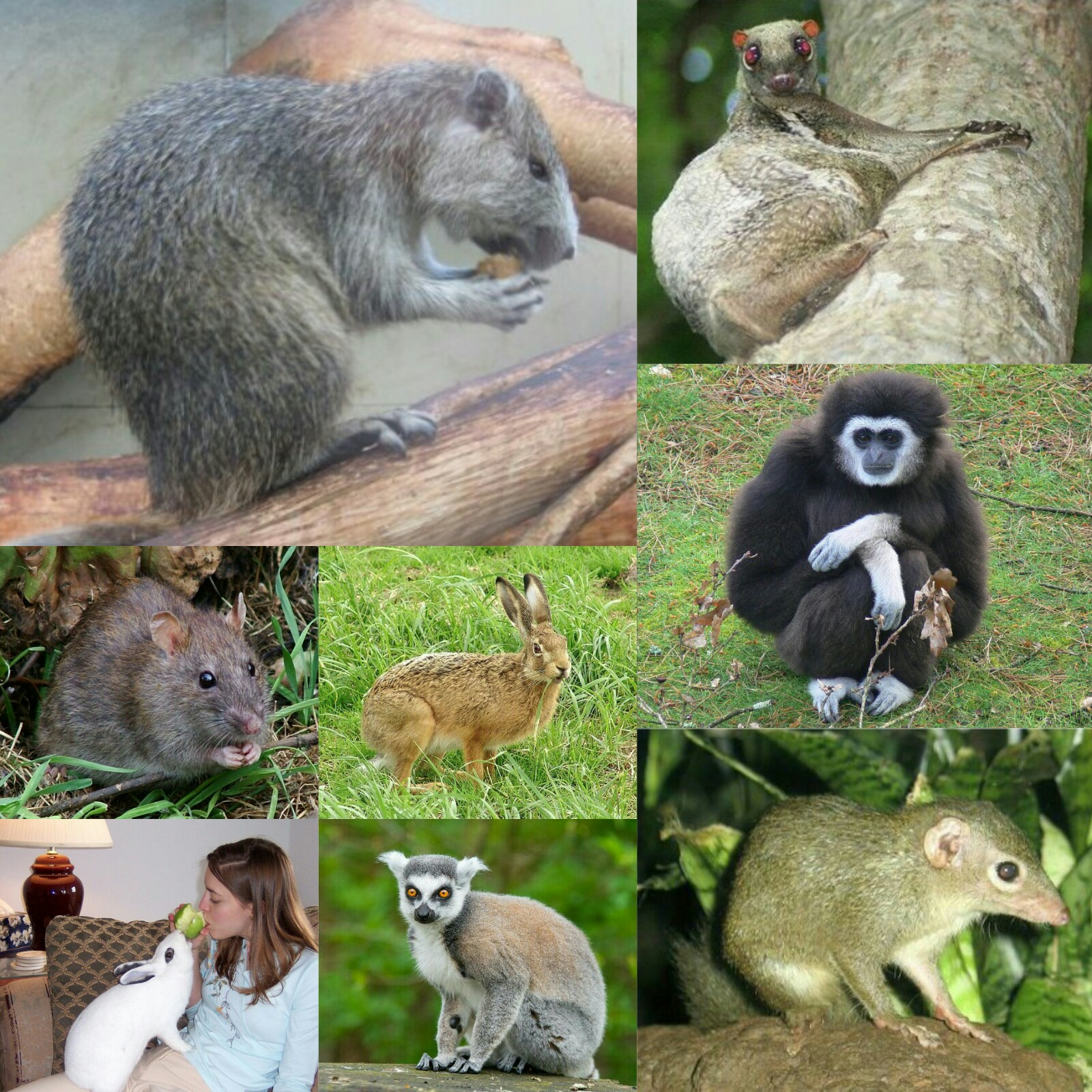
- From top to right: Desmarest's hutia, Sunda colugo, brown rat, European hare, lar gibbon, human playing with a rabbit, ring-tailed lemur, and a common treeshrew. Representing the orders: Dermoptera, Rodentia, Primates, Lagomorpha, and Scandentia, comprising Euarchontoglires.

Scientific classification
- Kingdom: Animalia
- Phylum: Chordata
- Class: Mammalia
- Clade: Eutheria
- Infraclass: Placentalia
- Magnorder: Boreoeutheria; Springer & de Jong, 2001; Murphy et al., 2001

Superorders
- Euarchontoglires; Laurasiatheria; For other potential members, see text

Synonyms
- Boreoplacentalia (Arnason, 2008); Boreotheria (Waddell, 2001)

= Boreoeutheria =

Boreoeutheria Temporal range: 66.043–0 Ma Late Cretaceous to present

Magnorder of mammals containing Laurasiatheria and Euarchontoglires

Boreoeutheria (/boʊˌriːoʊjuːˈθɛriə/) is a magnorder of placental mammals that groups together superorders Euarchontoglires and Laurasiatheria. The clade includes groups as diverse as giraffes, pigs, zebras, rhinoceroses, dogs, cats, rabbits, mice, bats, whales, dolphins, and primates (monkeys, apes, and humans).

With a few exceptions, (Note: Exceptional clades whose males lack the usual boreoeutherian scrotum are moles, hedgehogs, pangolins, some pinnipeds, rhinoceroses, tapirs, hippopotamuses, and cetaceans.) male boreoeutherians have a scrotum, an ancestral feature of the clade. The sub-clade Scrotifera was named after this feature.

== Etymology ==
The name of this magnorder comes from Ancient Greek words:

- Βορέας (Boreas) meaning 'north wind' or 'the North',
- εὐ- (eu-) meaning 'good', 'right', or 'true',
- and θηρίον (thēríon) meaning 'beast'.

== Boreoeutherian ancestor ==
The majority of earliest known fossils belonging to this group date to about 66 million years ago, shortly after the K-Pg extinction event, though molecular data suggest they may have originated earlier, during the Cretaceous period. This is further supported with the earliest dated species of the pan-euungulate genus Protungulatum (P. coombsi about 70.6 to 66.043 Ma., and P. gorgun about 70.6 to 63.8 Ma.), alongside pan-carnivoran species Altacreodus magnus (about 70.6 to 66.043 Ma.), periptychid species Paleoungulatum hooleyi (about 70.6 to 66.043 Ma.), and arctocyonid species Baioconodon nordicus (about 70.6 to 63.8 Ma.).

The common ancestor of Boreoeutheria lived between 107 and 90 million years ago. The concept of a boreoeutherian ancestor was first proposed in 2004 in the journal Genome Research. The paper's authors claimed that the genome sequence of the boreoeutherian ancestor could be computationally predicted with 98% accuracy, but would "take a few years and a lot of money". It is estimated to contain three billion base pairs.

== Classification and phylogeny ==
=== Taxonomy ===
- Magnorder: Boreoeutheria (Springer & de Jong, 2001) (northern placental mammals)
  - Superorder: Euarchontoglires (Murphy, 2001)
    - Grandorder: Euarchonta (Waddell, 1999)
    - Clade: Gliriformes (Wyss & Meng, 1996)
    - Order: †Apatotheria (Scott & Jepsen, 1936)
    - Family: †Picrodontidae (Simpson, 1937)
  - Superorder: Laurasiatheria (Waddell, 1999) (laurasian placental mammals)
    - Clade: Scrotifera (Waddell, 1999)
    - Order: Eulipotyphla (Waddell, 1999) (true insectivores)
  - Incertae sedis:
    - Genus: †Veratalpa (Ameghino, 1905) (Note: Florentino Ameghino in 1905. placed this genus in Talpidae, but in 1974. John Howard Hutchison classified it as rodent. Currently, Veratalpa is classified as a member of Placentalia of uncertain affinities, according to 1997. "Classification of Mammals" by Malcolm McKenna and Susan Bell.)

== See also ==
- Mammal classification
- Placentalia
