= Retrotransposon marker =

DNA component used as cladistic marker

Retrotransposon markers are components of DNA which are used as cladistic markers. They assist in determining the common ancestry, or not, of related taxa. The "presence" of a given retrotransposon in related taxa suggests their orthologous integration, a derived condition acquired via a common ancestry, while the "absence" of particular elements indicates the plesiomorphic condition prior to integration in more distant taxa. The use of presence/absence analyses to reconstruct the systematic biology of mammals depends on the availability of retrotransposons that were actively integrating before the divergence of a particular species.

== Details ==
The analysis of SINEs – Short INterspersed Elements – LINEs – Long INterspersed Elements – or truncated LTRs – Long Terminal Repeats – as molecular cladistic markers represents a particularly interesting complement to DNA sequence and morphological data.

The reason for this is that retrotransposons are assumed to represent powerful noise-poor synapomorphies. The target sites are relatively unspecific so that the chance of an independent integration of exactly the same element into one specific site in different taxa is not large and may even be negligible over evolutionary time scales. Retrotransposon integrations are currently assumed to be irreversible events; this might change since no eminent biological mechanisms have yet been described for the precise re-excision of class I transposons, but see van de Lagemaat et al. (2005). A clear differentiation between ancestral and derived character state at the respective locus thus becomes possible as the absence of the introduced sequence can be with high confidence considered ancestral.

In combination, the low incidence of homoplasy together with a clear character polarity make retrotransposon integration markers ideal tools for determining the common ancestry of taxa by a shared derived transpositional event. The "presence" of a given retrotransposon in related taxa suggests their orthologous integration, a derived condition acquired via a common ancestry, while the "absence" of particular elements indicates the plesiomorphic condition prior to integration in more distant taxa. The use of presence/absence analyses to reconstruct the systematic biology of mammals depends on the availability of retrotransposons that were actively integrating before the divergence of a particular species.

Examples for phylogenetic studies based on retrotransposon presence/absence data are the definition of whales as members of the order Cetartiodactyla with hippos being their closest living relatives, hominoid relationships, the strepsirrhine tree, the marsupial radiation from South America to Australia, and the placental mammalian evolution.

Inter-retrotransposons amplified polymorphisms (IRAPs) are alternative retrotransposon-based markers. In this method, PCR oligonucleotide primers face outwards from terminal retrotransposon regions. Thus, they amplify the fragment between two retrotransposon insertions. As retrotransposon integration patterns vary between genotypes, the number and size of the resulting amplicons can be used for differentiation of genotypes or cultivars, to measure genetic diversity or to reconstruct phylogenies. SINEs, which are small in size and often integrate within or next to genes represent an optimal source for the generation of effective IRAP markers.
