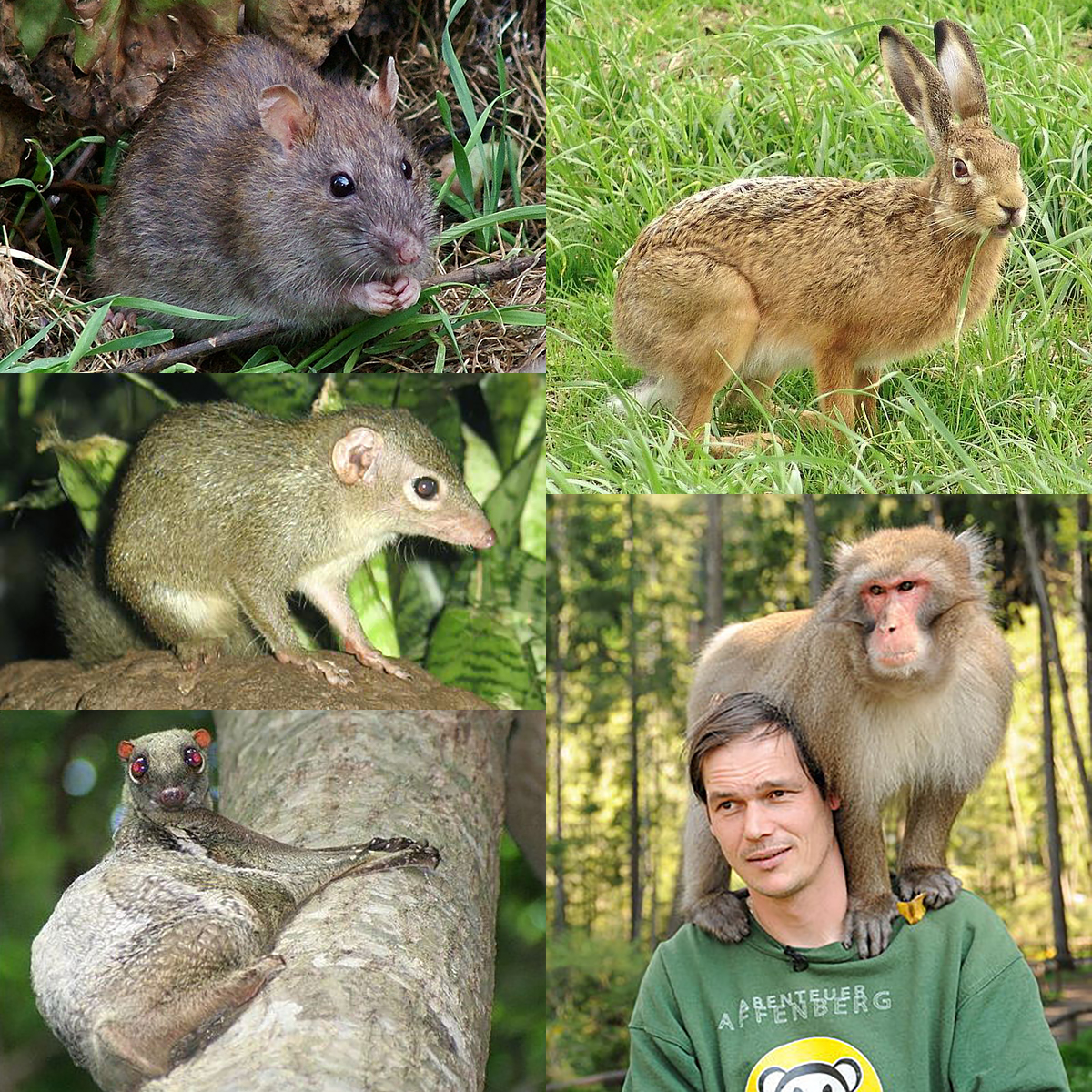
- From top to bottom (left): rat, treeshrew, colugo; (right) hare, macaque with human.

Scientific classification
- Kingdom: Animalia
- Phylum: Chordata
- Class: Mammalia
- Magnorder: Boreoeutheria
- Superorder: Euarchontoglires; Murphy et al., 2001

Subgroups
- †Apatemyidae?; Gliriformes; †Anagaloidea; †Arctostylopidae?; Glires; Lagomorpha (rabbits and kin); Rodentia (rodents); Euarchonta; Primatomorpha; Dermoptera (colugos); Primates (primates); Scandentia (tree shrews)

= Euarchontoglires =

Euarchontoglires Temporal range: Paleocene–Present

Superorder of mammals

Euarchontoglires (from Euarchonta 'true rulers' + Glires 'dormice'), synonymous with Supraprimates, is a clade and a superorder of placental mammals, the living members of which belong to one of the five following groups: rodents, lagomorphs, treeshrews, primates, and colugos.

== Classification ==
Phylogenetic position of living Euarchontoglires (in blue) among placentals in a genus-level molecular phylogeny of 116 extant mammals inferred from the gene tree information of 14,509 coding DNA sequences. The other major clades are colored: marsupials (magenta), xenarthrans (orange), afrotherians (red), and laurasiatherians (green).

=== External classification ===
The Euarchontoglires clade is based on DNA sequence analyses and retrotransposon markers that combine the clades Glires (Rodentia + Lagomorpha) and Euarchonta (Scandentia + Primates + Dermoptera). It is usually discussed without a taxonomic rank but has been called a cohort, magnorder, or superorder. Relations among the four cohorts (Euarchontoglires, Xenarthra, Laurasiatheria, Afrotheria) and the identity of the placental root remain controversial.

So far, few, if any, distinctive anatomical features have been recognized that support Euarchontoglires; nor does any strong evidence from anatomy support alternative hypotheses. Although both Euarchontoglires and diprotodont marsupials are documented to possess a vermiform appendix, this feature evolved as a result of convergent evolution.

Euarchontoglires probably split from the Boreoeutheria magnorder about 85 to 95 million years ago, during the Cretaceous, and developed in the Laurasian island group that would later become Europe. This hypothesis is supported by molecular evidence; so far, the earliest known fossils date to the early Paleocene. The combined clade of Euarchontoglires and Laurasiatheria is recognized as Boreoeutheria.

=== Internal Classification ===
The hypothesized relationship among the Euarchontoglires is as follows:

- Boreoeutheria
  - Laurasiatheria
  - Euarchontoglires
    - Glires
      - Lagomorpha (rabbits, hares, pikas)
      - Rodentia (rodents)
    - Euarchonta
      - Scandentia (treeshrews or banxrings)
      - Primatomorpha
        - Dermoptera (colugos)
        - Primates

One study based on DNA analysis suggests that Scandentia and Primates are sister clades, but does not discuss the position of Dermoptera. Although it is known that Scandentia is one of the most basal Euarchontoglires clades, the exact phylogenetic position is not yet considered resolved, and it may be a sister of Glires, Primatomorpha or Dermoptera or to all other Euarchontoglires. Some old studies place Scandentia as sister of the Glires, invalidating Euarchonta.
