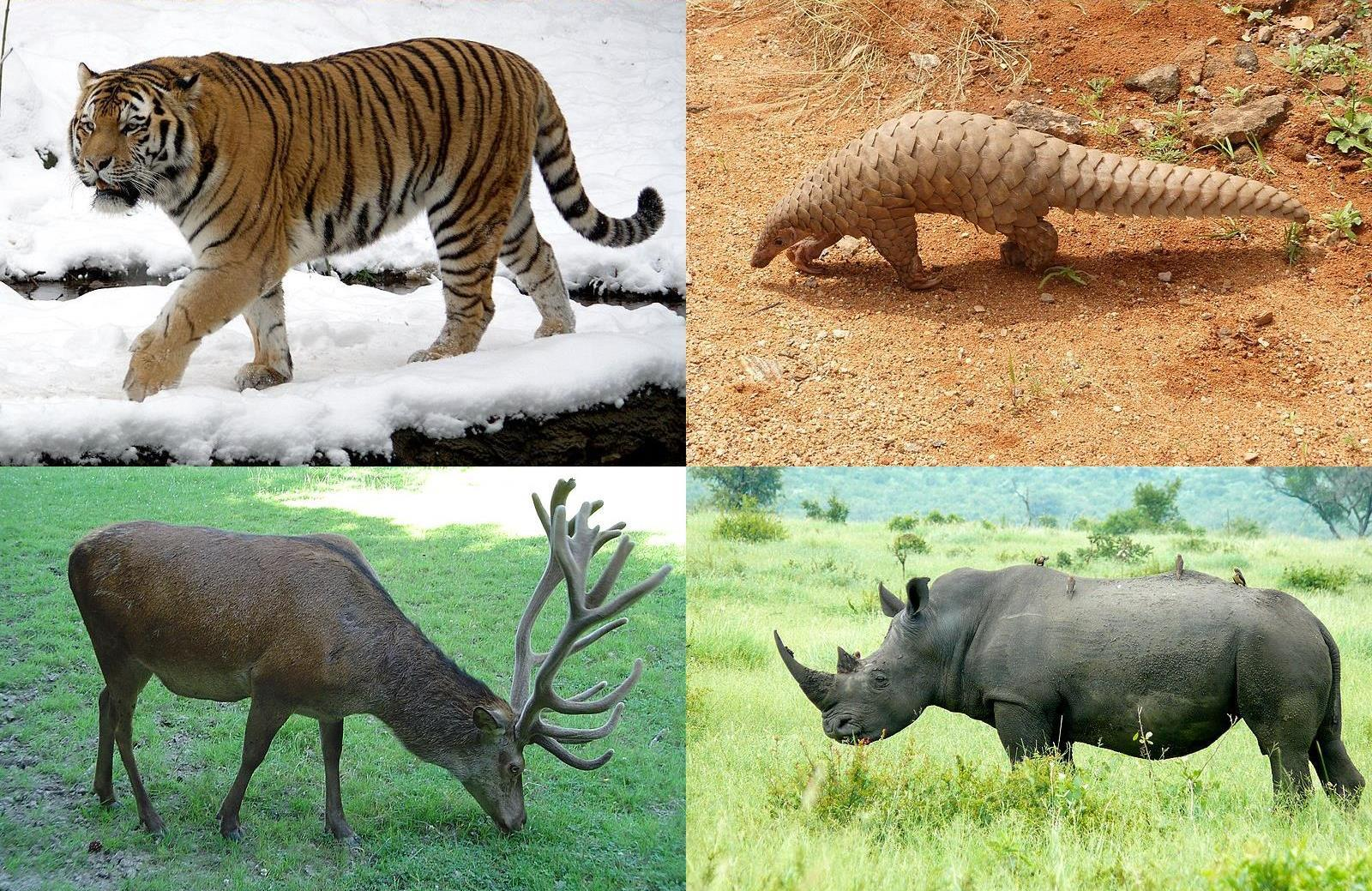

Scientific classification
- Kingdom: Animalia
- Phylum: Chordata
- Class: Mammalia
- Clade: Scrotifera
- Grandorder: Ferungulata; Simpson, 1945

Major subgroups
- Euungulata; Ferae; For other groups and classification history, see text

Synonyms
- Cetferungulata Arnason et al., 1999; Fereuungulata Waddell et al., 1999

= Ferungulata =

Ferungulata Temporal range: Late Cretaceous to present 70.5–0 Ma Suspected Campanian origin

Grandorder of mammals

Ferungulata ("wild beasts and ungulates") is a grandorder of placental mammals that groups together mirorder Ferae and clade Pan-Euungulata. It has existed in two guises, a traditional one based on morphological analysis and a revised one taking into account more recent molecular analyses. The Ferungulata is a sister group to the order Chiroptera (bats), and together they make the clade Scrotifera.

== General characteristics ==
According to a 2022 study by Anne E. Kort, members of the grand order Ferungulata, in addition to their genetic similarities, share a common synapomorphy in the lumbar vertebrae (the S-shaped postzygapophysis). In extant ferungulate mammals, this is known only within members of order Artiodactyla. However, this feature is found also in many extinct members of Ferungulata, including hyaenodonts, oxyaenids, mesonychids, arctocyonids and the stem-relatives of perissodactyls (like Cambaytherium). This synapomorphy suggests that this may be basal to all Ferungulata and secondarily lost in modern members, like carnivorans and crown Perissodactyla. A previous study has shown that these S-shaped zygapophyses prevent torsion between vertebrae. As said in this study, it is possible this feature evolved in response to a need for stabilization in the posterior spine as ribs became reduced. Also, in this and several other 2022 studies, the extinct eutherians pantodonts, tillodonts and genus Deltatherium (family Deltatheriidae) are recognised as crown-group placental mammals, who also possess S-shaped postzygapophyses like other members of Ferungulata.

== Classification and phylogeny ==
=== History of phylogeny ===
The traditional Ferungulata was established by George Gaylord Simpson in 1945. It grouped together the extant orders Carnivora, Perissodactyla and Artiodactyla with the Tubulidentata and the superorder Paenungulata, as well as a number of orders known only from fossils.

Simpson established the grouping on the basis of morphological criteria, but this traditional understanding of Ferungulata has been challenged by a more recent classification, relying upon genetic criteria. These studies separated his ungulate orders into two distinct placental groups, within Afrotheria and Laurasiatheria, respectively. The 'true' ungulates (mirorder Euungulata), Perissodactyla and Artiodactyla, are included in the revised group, along with the Carnivora, and with the addition of pangolins (order Pholidota), but the Tubulidentata and paenungulates are excluded. Although Simpson placed whales (Cetacea) in a separate cohort, recent evidence linking them to Artiodactyla would mean that they belong here as well. To reflect this difference, the revised clade is usually referred to as Ferungulata.

The karyotypes of ferungulates are highly conserved: "the fereungulatan ancestor chromosomes (n = 23 + X) ... differ from those of the antecedent scrotiferan ancestor by five rearrangements that occurred over 1 My" (citation excluded). For the fereungulatan ancestor, we discovered four ancestral syntenies..."

Point coloration has been observed in a wide variety of ferungulates, including cats, foxes, horses, and dogs.

=== Taxonomy ===
Former classification (Simpson, 1945):	Current classification:
Cohort: Ferungulata (Simpson, 1945); Superorder: Ferae (Linnaeus, 1758); Order: Carnivora (Bowdich, 1821) (carnivorans); Clade: Ungulata (Linnaeus, 1766) (ungulates); Superorder: Mesaxonia (Marsh, 1884); Order: Perissodactyla (Owen, 1848) (odd-toed ungulates); Superorder: Paenungulata (Simpson, 1945); Order: Hyracoidea (Huxley, 1869) (hyraxes); Order: Proboscidea (Illiger, 1811) (proboscideans); Order: Sirenia (Illiger, 1811) (sea-cows); Order: †Dinocerata (Marsh, 1872); Order: †Embrithopoda (Andrews, 1906); Order: †Pantodonta (Cope, 1873); Order: †Pyrotheria (Ameghino, 1895); Superorder: Paraxonia (Marsh, 1884); Order: Artiodactyla (Owen, 1848) (even-toed ungulates); Superorder: Protungulata (Simpson, 1945); Order: Tubulidentata (Huxley, 1872) (aardvarks); Order: †Astrapotheria (Lydekker, 1894); Order: †Condylarthra (Cope, 1881); Order: †Litopterna (Ameghino, 1889); Order: †Notoungulata (Roth, 1903)	Grandorder: Ferungulata (Simpson, 1945); Mirorder: Ferae (Linnaeus, 1758); Clade: Pan-Carnivora (Flynn, Wyss & Wolsan, 2020) (carnivorans and carnivoran-like mammals); Clade: Pholidotamorpha (Gaudin, 2009) (pangolins and pangolin-like mammals); (?) Order: †Pantolesta (McKenna, 1975); Clade: Pan-Euungulata (O'Leary, 2013) (true ungulates and stem-relatives); Mirorder: Euungulata (Waddell, 2001) (true ungulates); (?) Family: †Protungulatidae (Chatterjee, Scotese & Bajpai, 2017); Order: †Mesonychia (Van Valen, 1969); Incertae sedis ichnotaxa of Ferungulata: Ichnogenus: †Palimmecopus (Sargeant & Langston, 1994)

== See also ==
- Mammal classification
