= List of chordate orders =

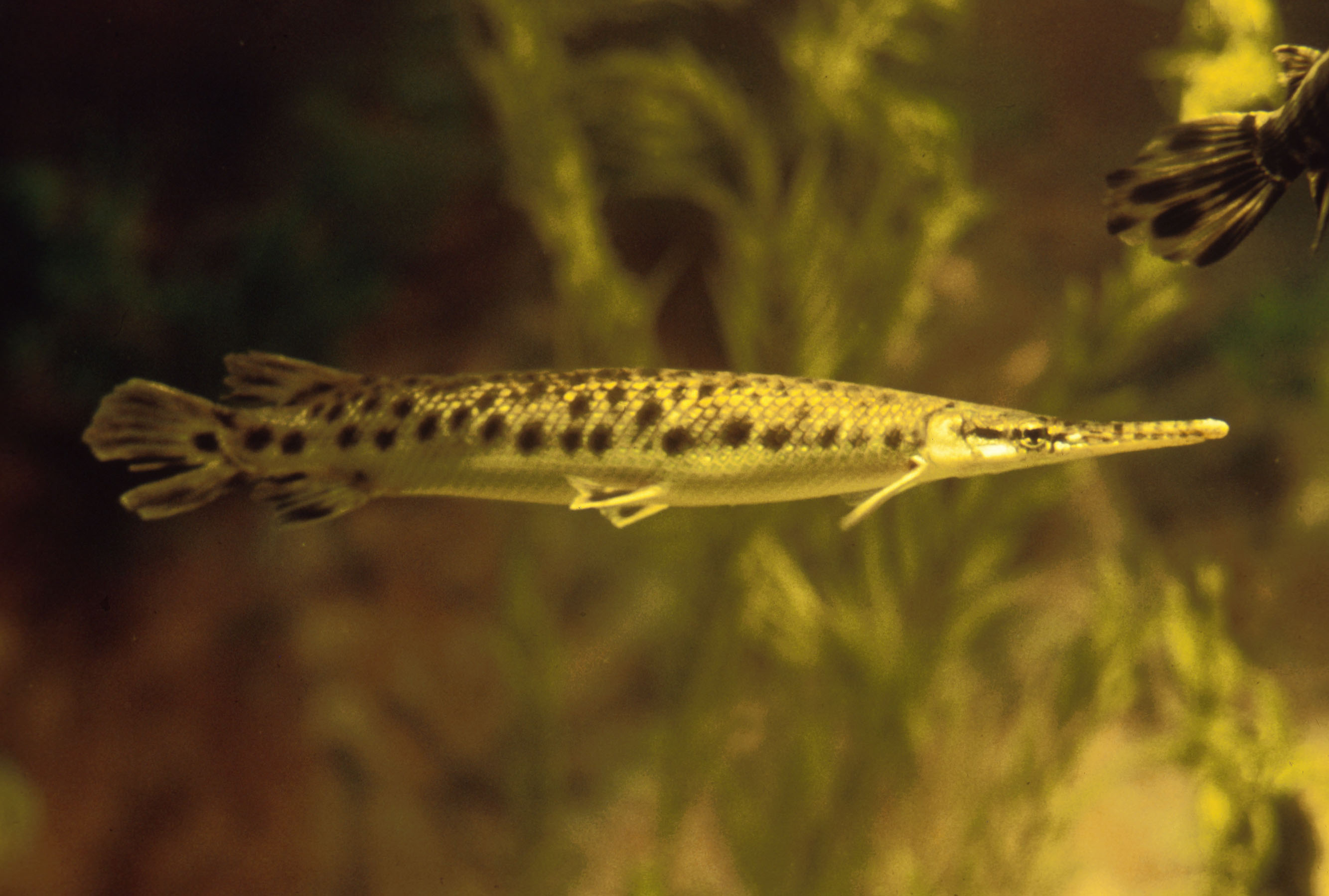
Spotted gar, Lepisosteus oculatus

This article contains a list of all of the classes and orders that are located in the Phylum Chordata.

The subphyla Tunicata and Vertebrata are in the unranked Olfactores clade, while the subphylum Cephalochordata is not. Animals in Olfactores are characterized as having a more advanced olfactory system than animals not in it.

The only extinct classes shown are Placodermi and Acanthodii. Many other extinct chordate groups are not shown here.

== Subphylum Cephalochordata ==
=== Class Leptocardii: Lancelets ===
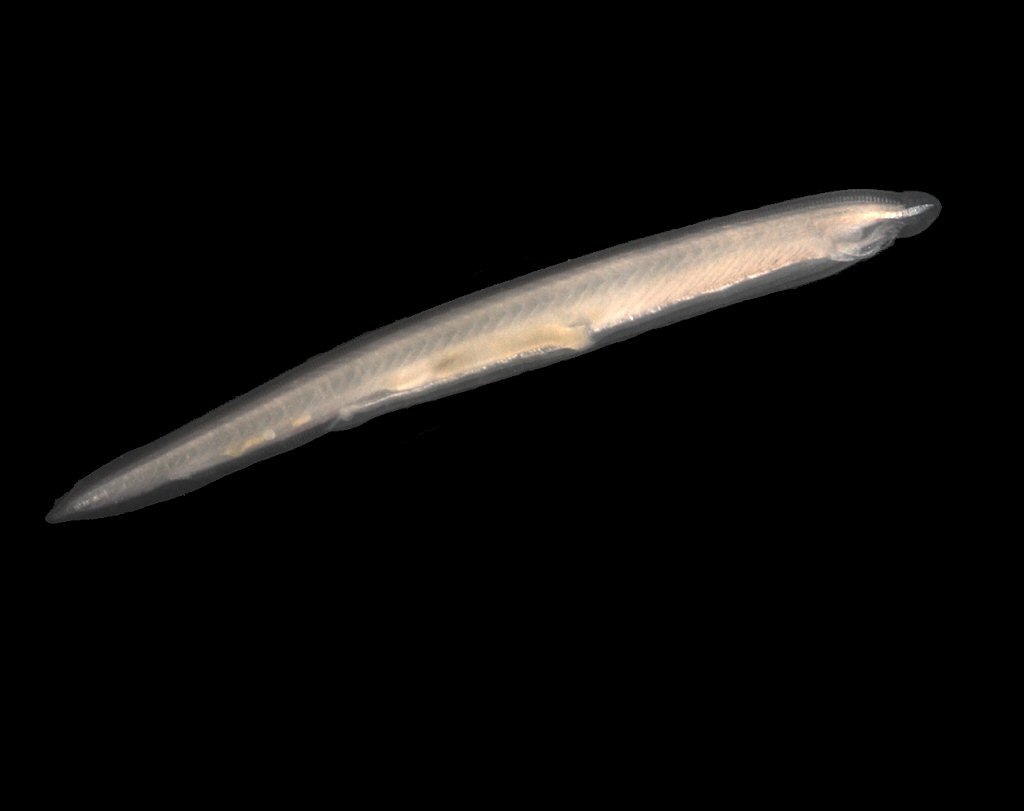
Lancelet Branchiostoma lanceolatum

- Order Amphioxiformes

== Subphylum Tunicata ==
=== Class Ascidiacea: Sessile tunicates ===
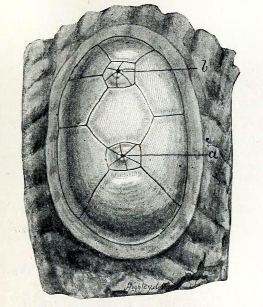
Chelyosoma macleayanum

- Order Enterogona
- Order Pleurogona
- Order Aspiraculata

=== Class Thaliacea: Pelagic tunicates ===
- Order Doliolida
- Order Pyrosomida
- Order Salpida: salps

=== Class Appendicularia: Solitary, free-swimming tunicates ===
- Order Copelata

== Subphylum Vertebrata ==
=== Infraphylum Agnatha: Jawless vertebrates ===
==== Superclass Cyclostomata: Extant jawless vertebrates ====
===== Class Myxini: Hagfish =====
- Order Myxiniformes

===== Class Hyperoartia: Lampreys =====
- Order Petromyzontiformes

=== Infraphylum Gnathostomata: Jawed vertebrates ===
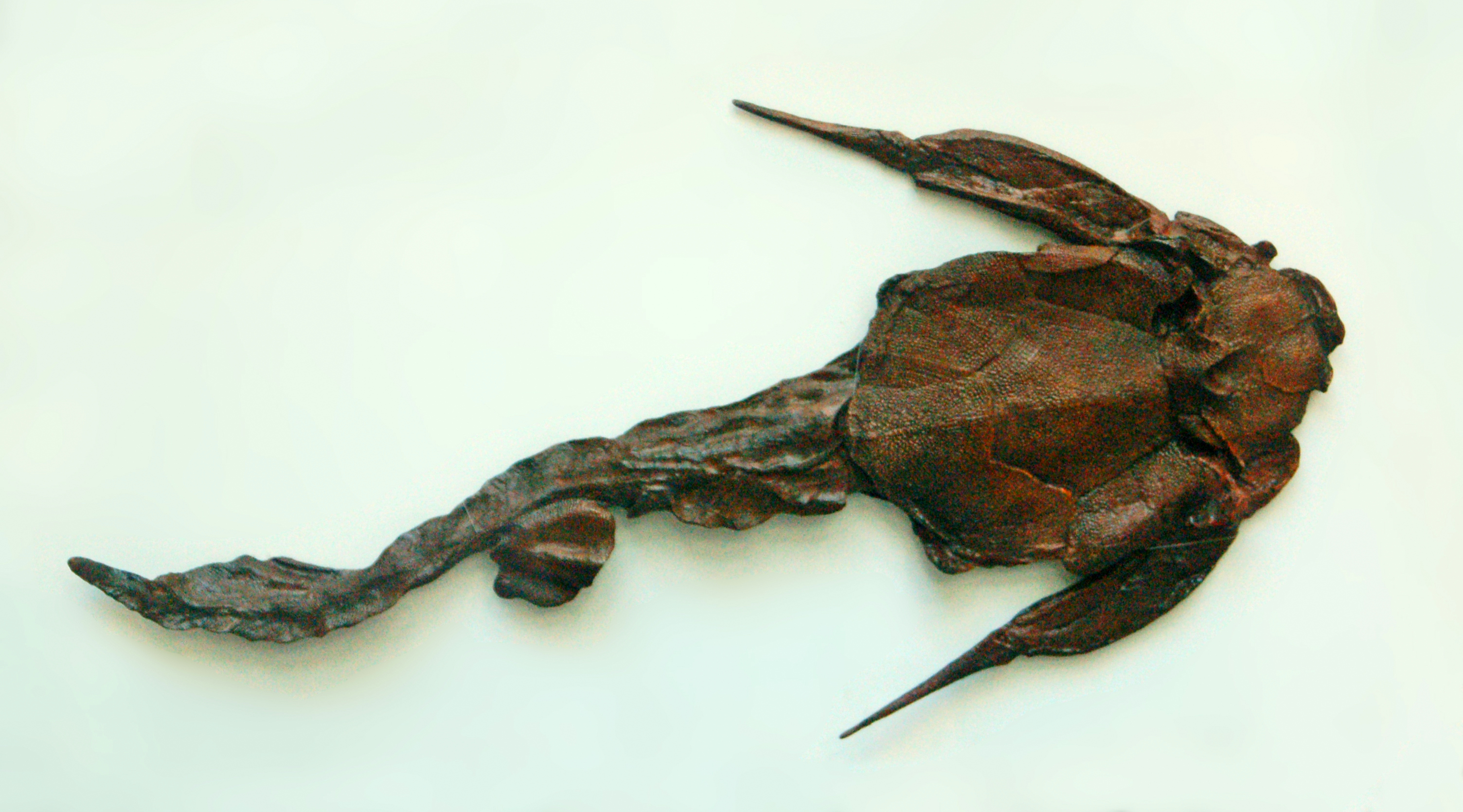
Bothriolepis canadensis

==== Class Placodermi: Armoured fish † ====
- Order Acanthothoraci
- Order Arthrodira
- Order Antiarchi
- Order Brindabellaspida
- Order Petalichthyida
- Order Phyllolepida
- Order Ptyctodontida
- Order Rhenanida
- Order Pseudopetalichthyida (The placement of this order is debated.)
- Order Stensioellida (The placement of this monotypic order is debated.)

==== Class Chondrichthyes: Cartilaginous fish ====
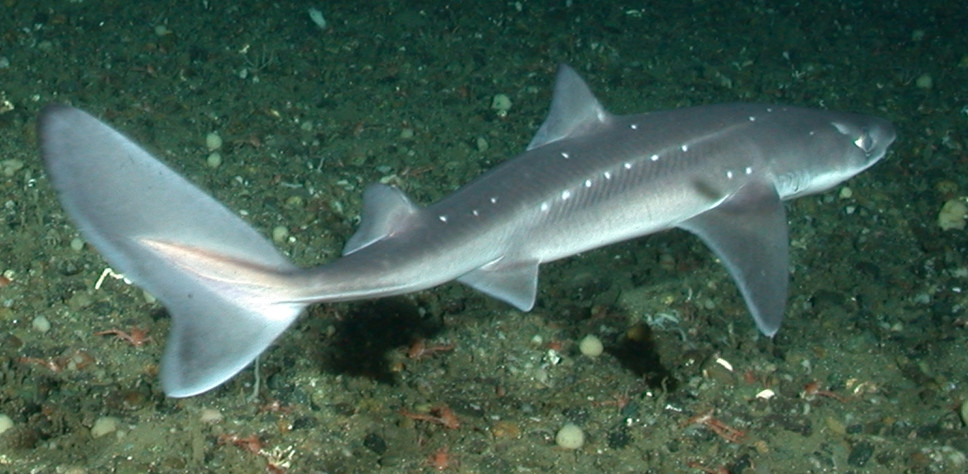
Dogfish shark

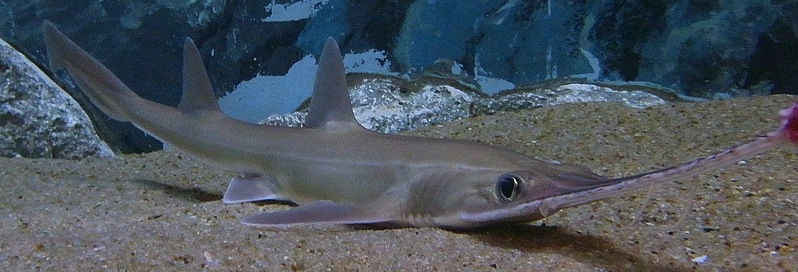
Pristiophorus japonicus

- Subclass Elasmobranchii
  - Superorder Batoidea
    - Order Rajiformes: rays and skates
    - Order Rhinopristiformes: sawfishes
    - Order Torpediniformes: electric rays
    - Order Myliobatiformes: (sting)rays
  - Superorder Selachimorpha (sharks)
    - Order Heterodontiformes: bullhead sharks
    - Order Orectolobiformes: carpet sharks
    - Order Carcharhiniformes: ground sharks
    - Order Lamniformes: mackerel sharks
    - Order Hexanchiformes: frilled and cow sharks
    - Order Squaliformes: dogfish sharks
    - Order Squatiniformes: angel sharks
    - Order Pristiophoriformes: saw sharks
- Subclass Holocephali
  - Order Chimaeriformes: chimaeras

==== Class Acanthodii: Spiny sharks † ====
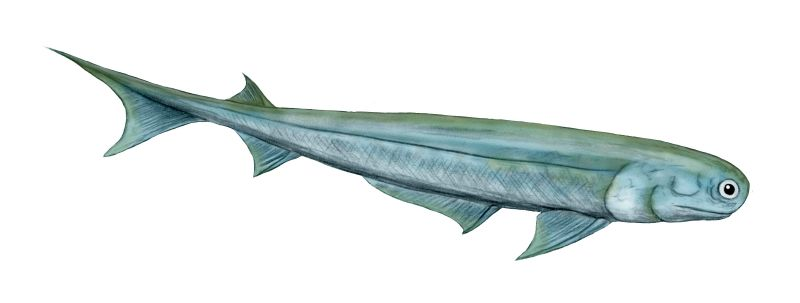
Acanthodes

- Order Climatiiformes
- Order Ischnacanthiformes
- Order Acanthodiformes

==== Superclass Osteichthyes: Bony fish ====
===== Class Actinopterygii: Ray-finned fish =====
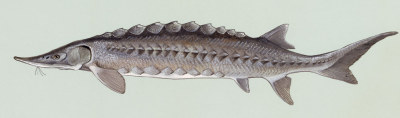
Atlantic sturgeon

- Order Asarotiformes †
- Order Discordichthyiformes †
- Order Paphosisciformes †
- Order Scanilepiformes †
- Order Cheirolepidiformes †
- Order Paramblypteriformes †
- Order Rhadinichthyiformes †
- Order Palaeonisciformes †
- Order Tarrasiiformes †
- Order Pachycormiformes †
- Order Ptycholepiformes †
- Order Redfieldiiformes †
- Order Haplolepidiformes †
- Order Aeduelliformes †
- Order Platysomiformes †
- Order Dorypteriformes †
- Order Eurynotiformes †

Subclass Cladistii

- Order Polypteriformes

Subclass Chondrostei

- Order Acipenseriformes: sturgeons and paddlefishes

Subclass Neopterygii

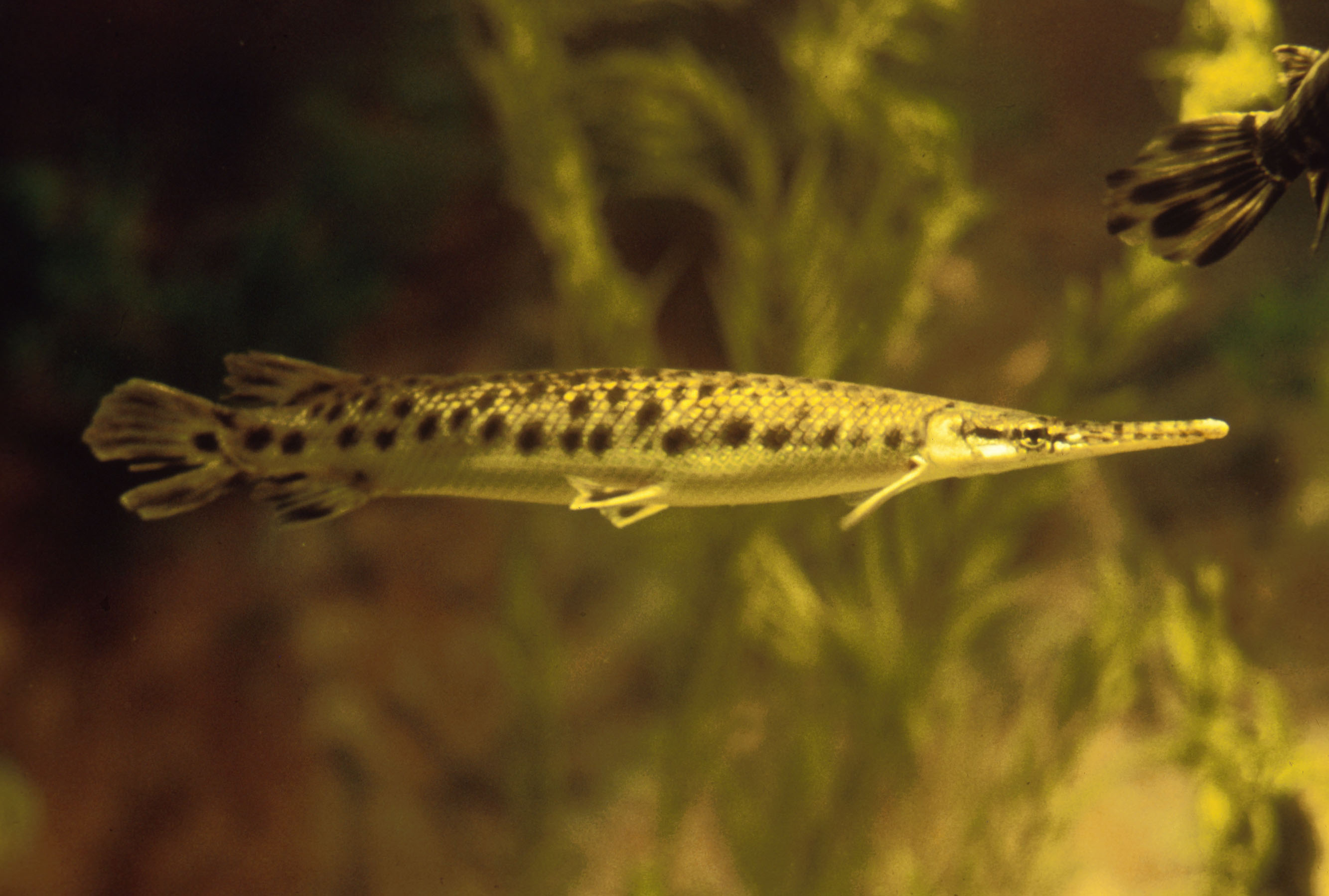
Lepisosteus oculatus

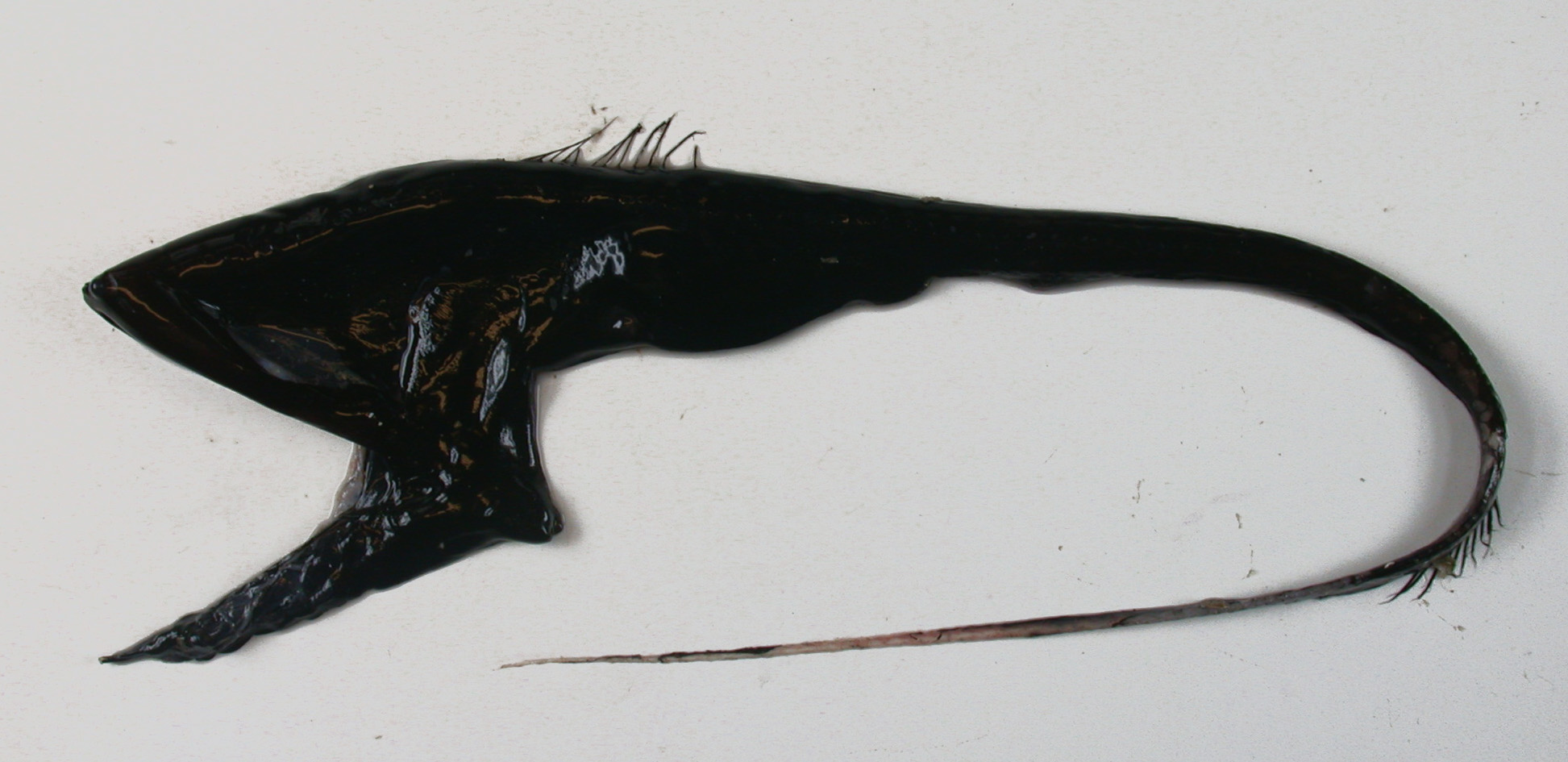
Eurypharynx pelecanoides

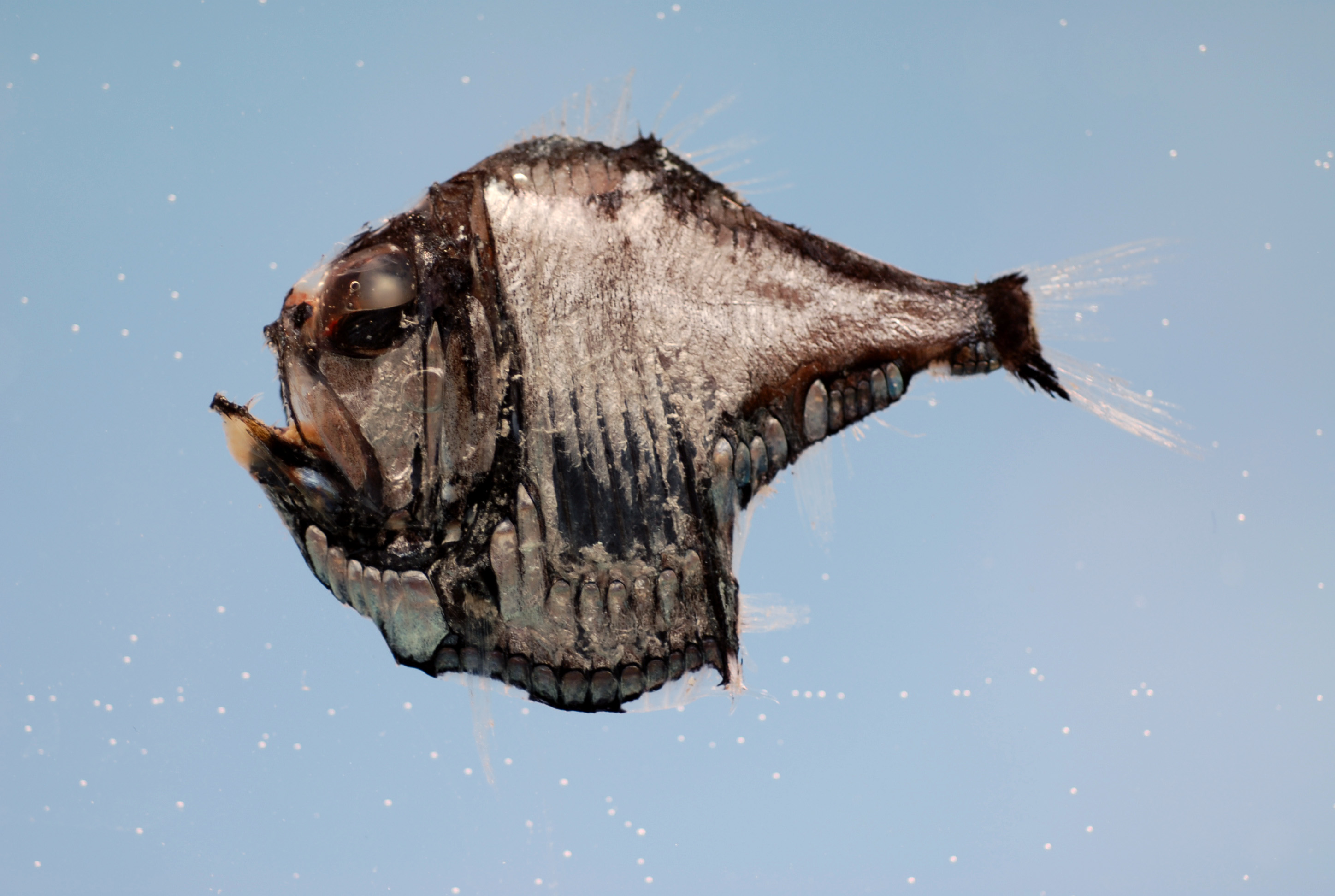
Argyropelecus aculeatus

- Infraclass Holostei
  - Order Lepisosteiformes, the gars
  - Order Amiiformes, the bowfins
- Infraclass Teleostei
- Superorder Osteoglossomorpha
  - Order Osteoglossiformes, the bony-tongued fishes
  - Order Hiodontiformes, including the mooneye and goldeye
  - Order Lycopteriformes †
  - Order Ichthyodectiformes †
- Superorder Elopomorpha
  - Order Elopiformes, including the ladyfishes and tarpon
  - Order Albuliformes, the bonefishes
  - Order Notacanthiformes, including the halosaurs and spiny eels
  - Order Anguilliformes, the true eels and gulpers
  - Order Saccopharyngiformes, including the gulper eel
- Superorder Clupeomorpha
  - Order Clupeiformes, including herrings and anchovies
- Superorder Ostariophysi
  - Order Gonorynchiformes, including the milkfishes
  - Order Cypriniformes, including barbs, carp, danios, goldfishes, loaches, minnows, rasboras
  - Order Characiformes, including characins, pencilfishes, hatchetfishes, piranhas, tetras.
  - Order Gymnotiformes, including electric eels and knifefishes
  - Order Siluriformes, the catfishes
- Superorder Protacanthopterygii
  - Order Salmoniformes, including salmon and trout
  - Order Esociformes the pike
  - Order Osmeriformes, including the smelts and galaxiids
- Superorder Stenopterygii
  - Order Ateleopodiformes, the jellynose fish
  - Order Stomiiformes, including the bristlemouths and marine hatchetfishes
- Superorder Cyclosquamata
  - Order Aulopiformes, including the Bombay duck and lancetfishes
- Superorder Scopelomorpha
  - Order Myctophiformes, including the lanternfishes
- Superorder Lampridiomorpha
  - Order Lampriformes, including the oarfish, opah and ribbonfishes
- Superorder Polymyxiomorpha
  - Order Polymixiiformes, the beardfishes
- Superorder Paracanthopterygii
  - Order Percopsiformes, including the cavefishes and trout-perches
  - Order Batrachoidiformes, the toadfishes
  - Order Lophiiformes, including the anglerfishes
  - Order Gadiformes, including cods
  - Order Ophidiiformes, including the pearlfishes
- Superorder Acanthopterygii
  - Order Mugiliformes, the mullets
  - Order Atheriniformes, including silversides and rainbowfishes
  - Order Beloniformes, including the flyingfishes
  - Order Cetomimiformes, the whalefishes
  - Order Cyprinodontiformes, including livebearers, killifishes
  - Order Stephanoberyciformes, including the ridgeheads
  - Order Beryciformes, including the fangtooths and pineconefishes
  - Order Zeiformes, including the dories
  - Order Gobiesociformes, the clingfishes
  - Order Gasterosteiformes including sticklebacks, pipefishes, seahorses
  - Order Syngnathiformes, including the seahorses and pipefishes
  - Order Synbranchiformes, including the swamp eels
  - Order Tetraodontiformes, including the filefishes and pufferfish
  - Order Pleuronectiformes, the flatfishes
  - Order Scorpaeniformes, including scorpionfishes and the sculpins
  - Order Perciformes 40% of all fish including anabantids, centrarchids (incl. bass and sunfish), cichlids, gobies, gouramis, mackerel, perches, scats, whiting, wrasses

===== Class Sarcopterygii: Lobe-finned fish =====
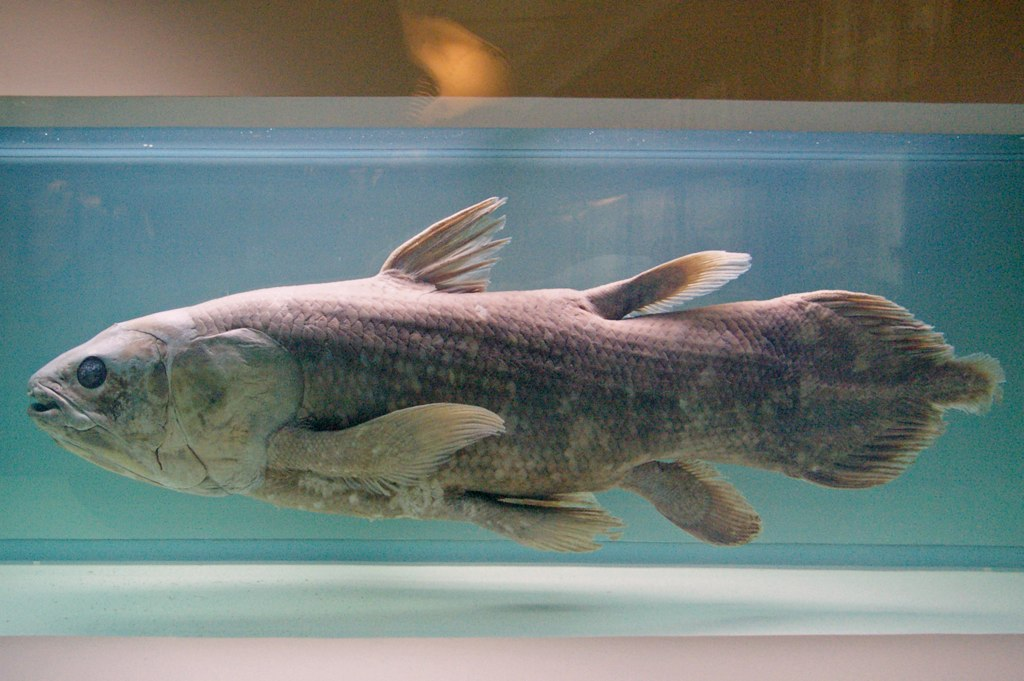
West Indian Ocean coelacanth

- Subclass Actinistia (coelacanths)
  - Order Coelacanthiformes
- Subclass Dipnoi (lungfish)
  - Order Ceratodontiformes

==== Superclass Tetrapoda: Four-limbed vertebrates ====
===== Class Amphibia: Amphibians =====
- Order Urodela or Caudata (salamanders)
- Order Anura (frogs and toads)
- Order Gymnophiona or Apoda (caecilians)

===== Class Reptilia: Reptiles =====
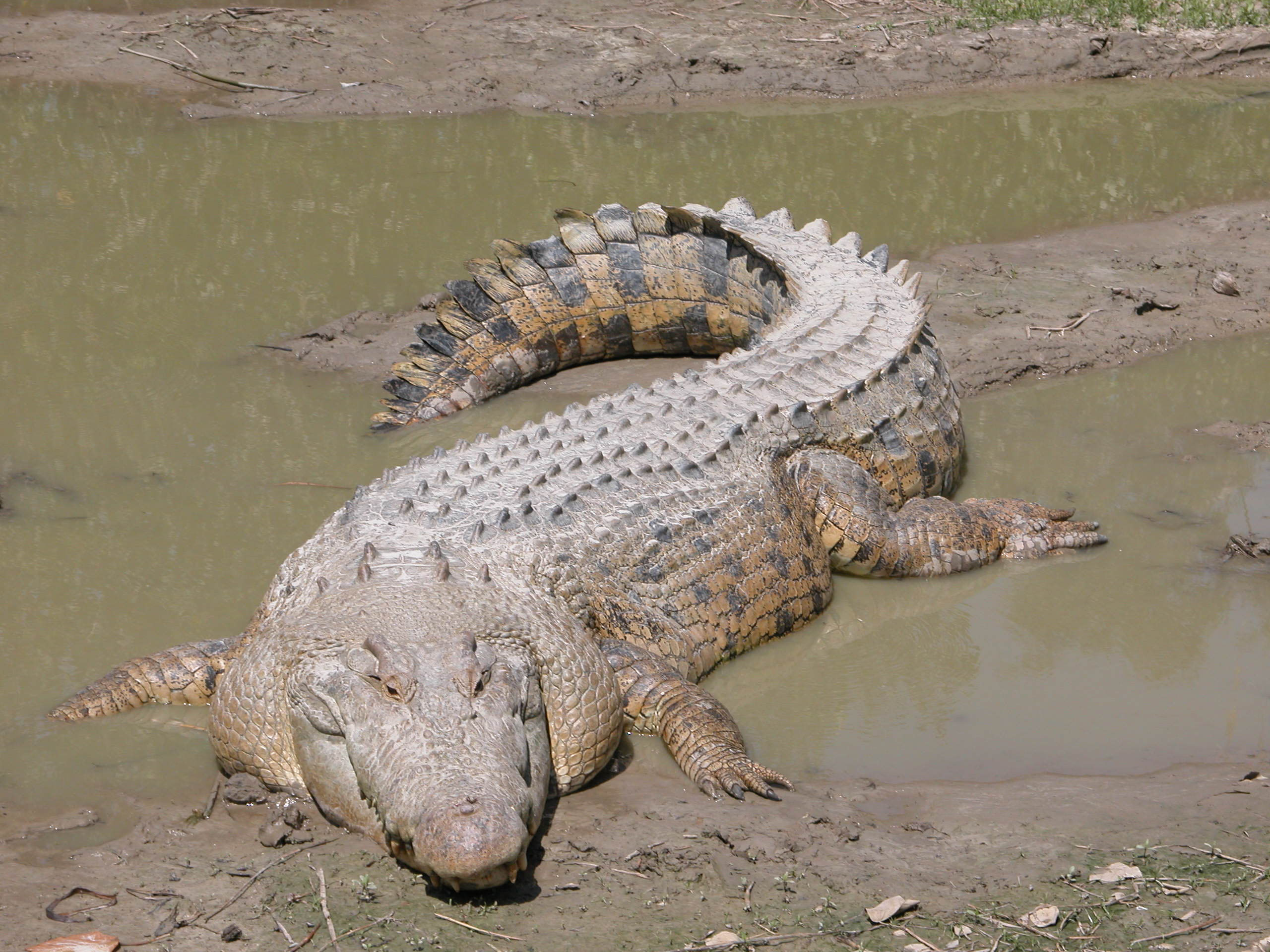
Saltwater crocodile

- Subclass Diapsida
  - Infraclass Archosauromorpha
    - Superorder Crocodylomorpha
      - Order Crocodilia (crocodilians)
  - Infraclass Lepidosauromorpha
    - Superorder Lepidosauria
      - Order Rhynchocephalia (tuataras)
      - Order Squamata (lizards, snakes)
- Subclass Anapsida
  - Order Testudines (turtles and their kin)

===== Class Aves: Birds =====
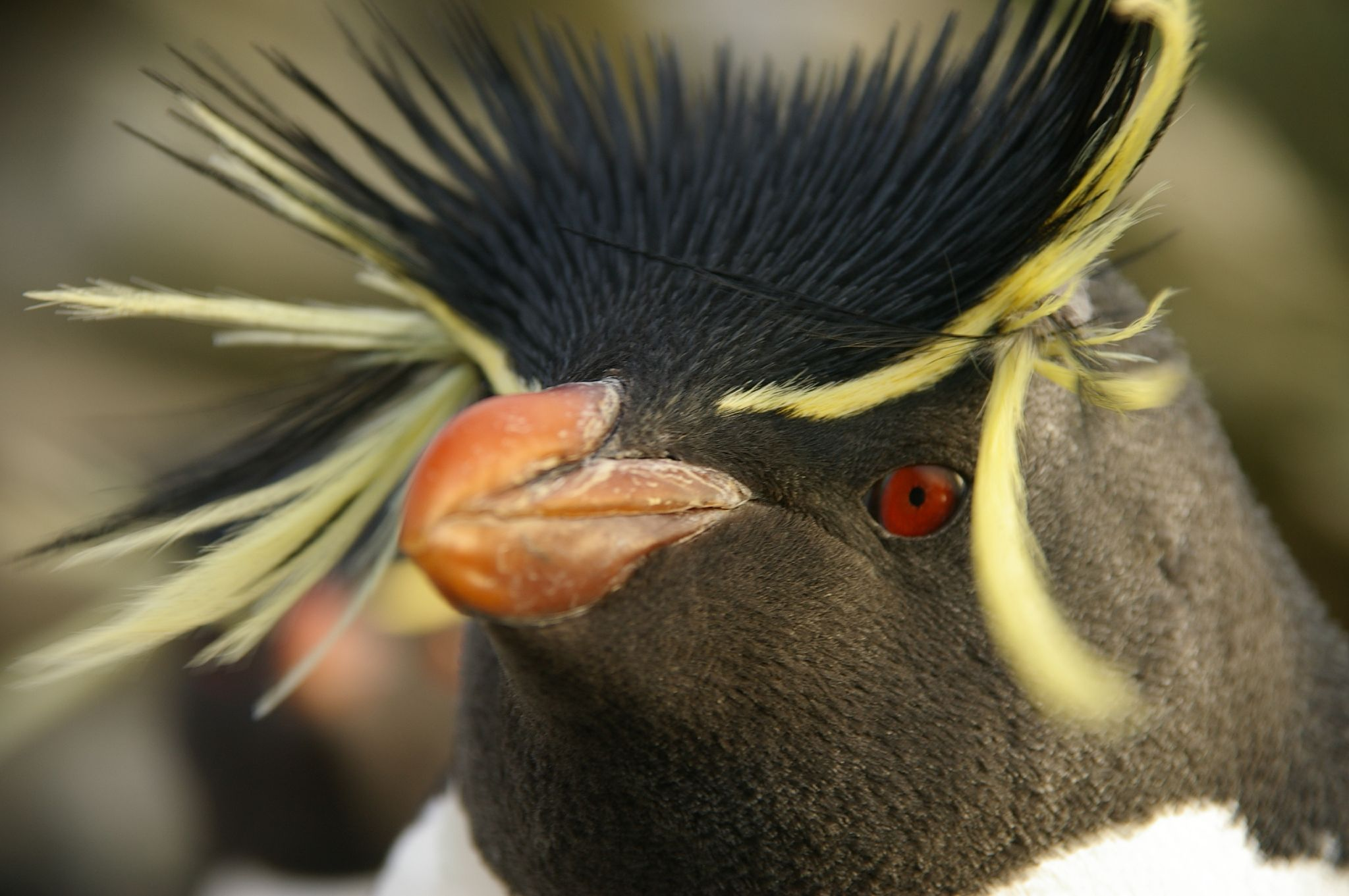
Southern rockhopper penguin (Eudyptes chrysocome), a flightless bird

- Subclass Neornithes
  - Infraclass Palaeognathae
    - Order Apterygiformes, kiwis
    - Order Casuariiformes, cassowaries and emu
    - Order Dinornithiformes †, moas
    - Order Rheiformes, rheas
    - Order Struthioniformes, ostriches
    - Order Tinamiformes, tinamous
  - Infraclass Neognathae
    - Superorder Galloanserae (fowl)
      - Order Anseriformes, waterfowl
      - Order Gastornithiformes †, gastornis and mihirungs
      - Order Galliformes, fowl
    - Superorder Neoaves
      - Order Sphenisciformes, penguins
      - Order Gaviiformes, loons
      - Order Podicipediformes, grebes
      - Order Procellariiformes, albatrosses, petrels, and allies
      - Order Pelecaniformes, pelicans and allies
      - Order Ciconiiformes, storks and allies
      - Order Phoenicopteriformes, flamingos
      - Order Accipitriformes, eagles, hawks and allies (taxonomists have traditionally placed these groups in the Falconiformes)
      - Order Falconiformes, falcons
      - Order Cariamiformes, seriemas and terror birds
      - Order Opisthocomiformes, hoatzin (this enigmatic bird was traditionally treated as a family within either the Galliformes or Cuculiformes)
      - Order Gruiformes, cranes and allies
      - Order Charadriiformes, plovers and allies
      - Order Pterocliformes, sandgrouse (this enigmatic group was traditionally treated as a family in any of three different orders: Charadriiformes, Ciconiiformes, and Columbiformes)
      - Order Columbiformes, doves, pigeons and dodos
      - Order Psittaciformes, parrots and allies
      - Order Cuculiformes, cuckoos
      - Order Strigiformes, owls
      - Order Caprimulgiformes, nightjars and allies
      - Order Apodiformes, swifts
      - Order Coliiformes, mousebirds
      - Order Trogoniformes, trogons
      - Order Coraciiformes, kingfishers
      - Order Piciformes, woodpeckers and allies
      - Order Passeriformes, passerines

===== Class Mammalia: Mammals =====
- Subclass Prototheria
  - Order Monotremata, monotremes (platypus and echidnas)
- Subclass Theria
  - Infraclass Marsupialia
    - Order Didelphimorphia, opossums
    - Order Paucituberculata, rat opossums
    - Order Microbiotheria, monito del monte
    - Order Dasyuromorphia, marsupial carnivores (quolls, numbats, Tasmanian devils and thylacines)
    - Order Peramelemorphia, marsupial omnivores (bandicoots and bilbies)
    - Order Notoryctemorphia, marsupial moles
    - Order Diprotodontia, marsupial herbivores; kangaroos, wallabies, possums, koalas and allies
    - Order Polydolopimorphia †
  - Infraclass Eutheria
    - Magnorder Atlantogenata
      - Superorder Afrotheria
        - Grandorder Afrosoricida
          - Order Afrosoricida, tenrecs and golden moles
          - Order Macroscelidea, elephant shrews
          - Order Tubulidentata, aardvark
        - Grandorder Paenungulata
          - Order Hyracoidea, hyraxes
          - Mirorder Tethytheria
            - Order Proboscidea, elephants
            - Order Sirenia, manatees and dugongs
      - Superorder Xenarthra
        - Order Cingulata, armadillos
        - Order Pilosa, sloths and anteaters
    - Magnorder Boreoeutheria
      - Superorder Laurasiatheria
        - Order Eulipotyphla, hedgehogs, shrews, moles
        - Grandorder Ferungulata
          - Order Artiodactyla, cetaceans (dolphins and whales) and even-toed ungulates (giraffes, camels, pigs, cattle and deer)
          - Clade Pegasoferae
            - Order Chiroptera, bats
            - Mirorder Zooamata
              - Order Perissodactyla, odd-toed ungulates; horses, rhinos, tapirs
              - Clade Ferae
                - Order Pholidota, pangolins
                - Order Carnivora, carnivores; cats, dogs, bears, racoons, seals, and others
                - Order †Creodonta hyaenodontidae hyeanodon, dissopsalis, sarkastostodon, and megistotherium.
      - Superorder Euarchontoglires
        - Grandorder Euarchonta
          - Mirorder Sundatheria
            - Order Dermoptera, colugos
            - Order Scandentia, treeshrews
          - Mirorder Primatomorpha
            - Order Primates, lemurs, monkeys, apes and allies
        - Grandorder Glires
          - Order Rodentia, rodents (rats, squirrels, capybaras and beavers)
          - Order Lagomorpha, rabbits, hares and pikas

== See also ==
- List of animal classes
