= Gulper eel =

Gulper eel may refer to:

- Pelican eel (Eurypharynx pelecanoides), a species of deep-sea eel
- Saccopharynx, a genus of deep-sea eels
