= Saccopharynx lavenbergi =

Conservation status
- Least Concern (IUCN 3.1)

Scientific classification
- Kingdom: Animalia
- Phylum: Chordata
- Class: Actinopterygii
- Order: Anguilliformes
- Family: Saccopharyngidae
- Genus: Saccopharynx
- Species: S. lavenbergi

Binomial name
- Saccopharynx lavenbergi Nielsen & Bertelsen, 1985

Species of fish

Saccopharynx lavenbergi is a species of gulper eel, also known as the whiptail gulper. This fish is known for its large mouth and long whiplike tail. This species is not commonly found in the wild, with fewer than twenty sightings over 30 years of ROV operation by MBARI. Even though it has rarely been sighted, this gulper eel was chosen to be the logo for MBARI.

== Distribution ==
Saccopharynx lavenbergi occurs in the eastern Pacific Ocean.

== Description ==
The species is very similar to others in the genus Saccopharynx, featuring large mouths and long slender bodies. It is typically dark in color and has small eyes. This is probably because at the depths these eels dwell, there is little to no light from the sun. They also feature a bioluminescent organ at the tips of their long tails, the function of which is currently unknown.

== Ecology ==
It occurs at depths of 2,000–3,000 m (6,600–9,800 ft). It has been hypothesized that the large mouth of the eel allows it to swallow prey much larger than itself.

While no specimens have been observed mating in the wild, observations of dead specimens have led scientists to believe that this species dies after mating, much like freshwater eels.

== Taxonomy and phylogeny ==
In 2003, researchers from the University of Tokyo sequenced mitochondrial DNA (mtDNA) from specimens of Eurypharynx pelicanoides and Saccopharynx lavenbergi. After comparing the sequences from the specimens with other known sequences, they found that Eurypharynx pelicanoides and Saccopharynx lavenbergi were closely related and had mitochondrial genomes distinct from other Anguilliformes.
