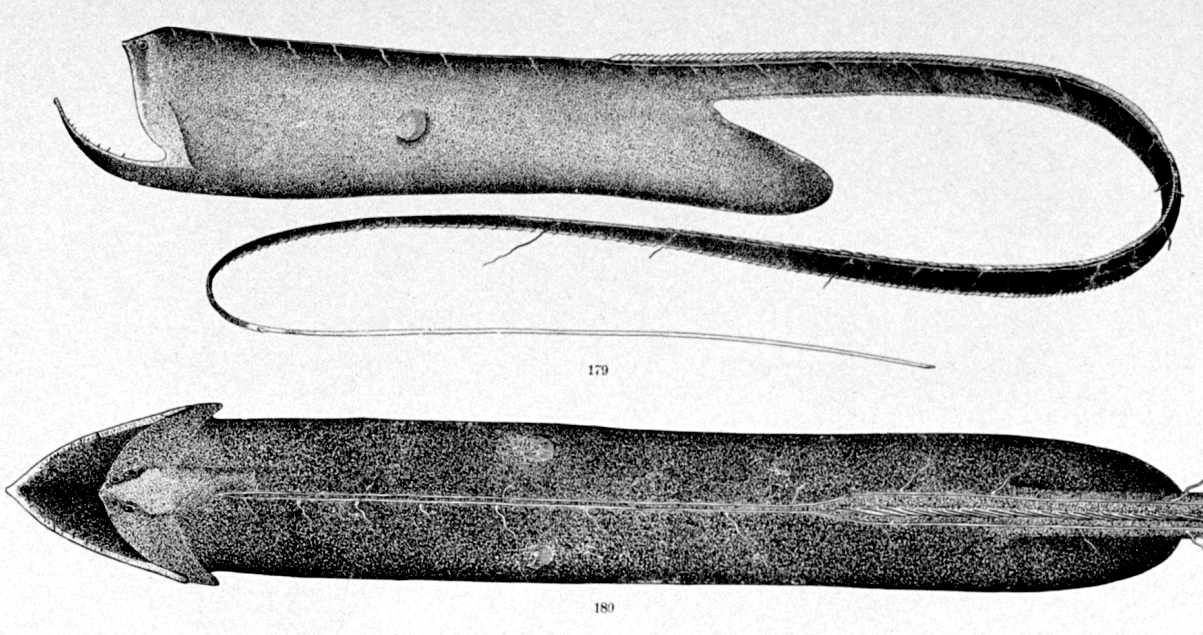

Conservation status
- Least Concern (IUCN 3.1)

Scientific classification
- Kingdom: Animalia
- Phylum: Chordata
- Class: Actinopterygii
- Order: Anguilliformes
- Family: Saccopharyngidae
- Genus: Saccopharynx
- Species: S. ampullaceus

Binomial name
- Saccopharynx ampullaceus Harwood, 1827

Synonyms
- Saccopharynx flagellum; Ophiognathus ampullaceus; Leptocephalus latissimus

= Saccopharynx ampullaceus =

Species of fish

Saccopharynx ampullaceus, referred to as the gulper eel, gulper, taillight gulper or pelican-fish, is an ocean-dwelling eel found in the North Atlantic Ocean. They are found up to a depth of 3,000 m (9,800 ft). These fish are rarely observed, so little information is currently known about their habits or full distribution.

== Type specimen ==
In the fall of 1826, a Captain Sawyer, of the ship Harmony, of Hull, while cruising for northern bottlenose whales at 62° N and about 57° W, found the type specimen, floating at the surface, of what was named Ophiognathus ampullaceus by I. Harwood, at the time the professor of natural history at the Royal Institution of Great Britain. It was at first thought to be an inflated seal skin, but on getting closer they realized it was alive. It was attempting to eat a perch of "about seven inches in circumference". The 1.37 metres (4 ft 6 in) specimen was captured and preserved in rum.

== Physical characteristics ==
Like other saccopharyngiforms, these fish have large mouths and long, slender bodies with long tails that have a bioluminescent organ at the tip. The function of this organ is currently unknown.

Saccopharynx ampullaceus lacks a traditional gas-filled swim bladder, presumably due to the pressures at the depths they live in. Instead, the function of the swim bladder has been replaced by lymphatic spaces that run along the spine which are filled with a gelatinous substance. This gelatinous substance is thought to be maintained by the eel's aglomerular kidney.
