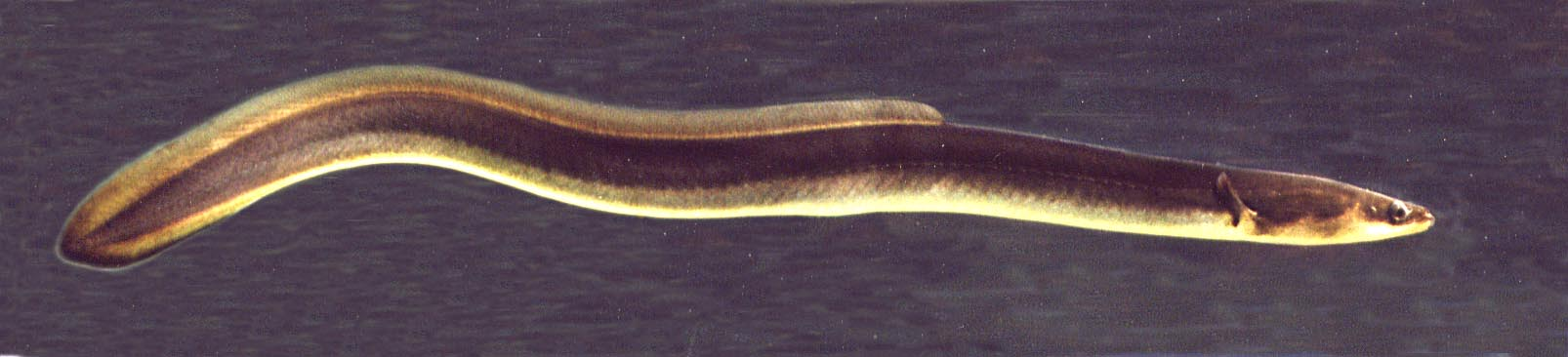
- American eel, Anguilla rostrata

Scientific classification
- Kingdom: Animalia
- Phylum: Chordata
- Class: Actinopterygii
- Order: Anguilliformes
- Suborder: Anguilloidei; Bleeker, 1859

Families
- See text

= Anguilloidei =

Suborder of eels

Anguilloidei is a suborder of ray-finned fishes belonging to the order Anguilliformes, the eels.

== Families ==
The Anguilloidei contains the following families:

- Moringuidae Gill, 1885 (spaghetti eels)
- Anguillidae Rafinesque, 1810 (freshwater eels)
- Nemichthyidae Kaup. 1859 (snipe eels or threadtail snipe eels)
- Serrivomeridae Trewavas, 1932 (sawtooth eels)
- Cyematidae Regan, 1912 (bobtail eels)
- Monognathidae Trewavas, 1937 (onejaw gulpers)
- Neocyematidae Poulsen, M. J. Miller, Sado, Hanel, Tsukamoto & Miya, 2018 (orange bobtail eels)
- Eurypharyngidae Gill, 1883 (gulper eels or pelican eels)
- Saccopharyngidae Bleeker, 1859 (swallower eels or whiptail gulpers)

This suborder historically included several other families that have recently been moved to new suborders: Chlopsidae (false morays), Heterenchelyidae (mud eels), Muraenidae (moray eels), and Myrocongridae (thin eels).
