= Saccopharynx thalassa =

Conservation status
- Least Concern (IUCN 3.1)

Scientific classification
- Kingdom: Animalia
- Phylum: Chordata
- Class: Actinopterygii
- Order: Anguilliformes
- Family: Saccopharyngidae
- Genus: Saccopharynx
- Species: S. thalassa

Binomial name
- Saccopharynx thalassa Nielsen & Bertelsen, 1985

Species of fish

Saccopharynx thalassa is a species of ray-finned fish within the family Saccopharyngidae. Its known to live in the Eastern Atlantic near Madeira and the Canary Islands, and the Western Atlantic near Bermuda at depths up to 1,700 metres (5,580 ft). It grows to a length of 107 to 110 centimetres (42 to 43 in). It has been classified as a 'Least concern' species by the IUCN Red List, as it has a wide distribution with no known major threats.
