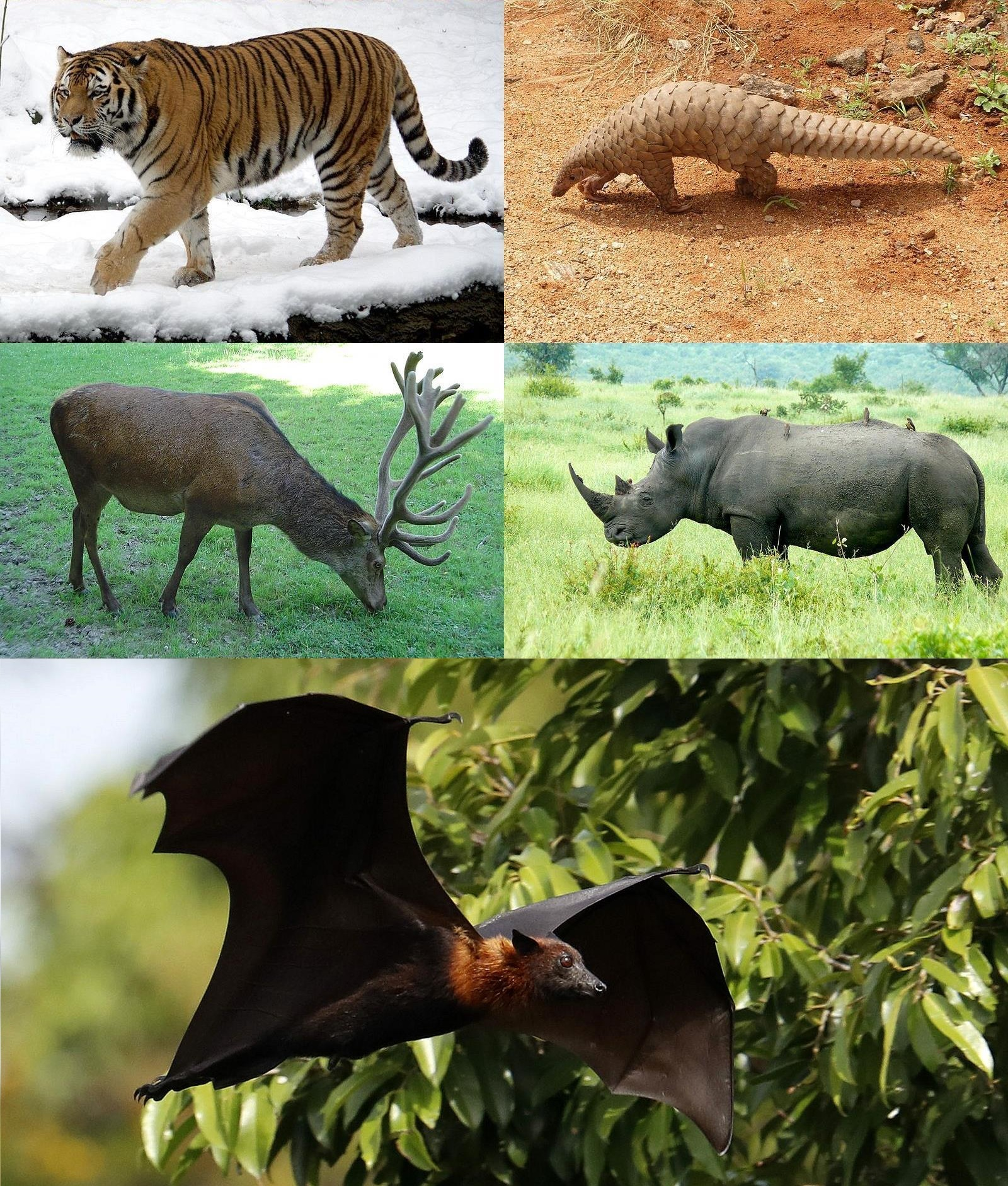
- Representatives of the living orders of scrotiferans, from top to right: tiger (Carnivora), Indian pangolin (Pholidota), red deer (Artiodactyla), white rhino (Perissodactyla) and Lyle's flying fox (Chiroptera).

Scientific classification
- Kingdom: Animalia
- Phylum: Chordata
- Class: Mammalia
- Infraclass: Placentalia
- Superorder: Laurasiatheria
- Clade: Scrotifera; Waddell et al., 1999

Major subgroups
- Chiroptera; Ferungulata; For other groups and classification history, see text

Synonyms
- Variamana (Springer, 2005)

= Scrotifera =

Scrotifera Temporal range: 66.3–0 Ma Late Cretaceous to present

Clade of mammals

Scrotifera ("scrotum bearers") is a clade of placental mammals that groups together grandorder Ferungulata, Chiroptera (bats), other extinct members and their common ancestors. The clade Scrotifera is a sister group to the order Eulipotyphla (true insectivores) based on evidence from molecular phylogenetics, and together they make up the superorder Laurasiatheria. The last common ancestor of Scrotifera is supposed to have diversified ca. 73.1 to 85.5 million years ago.

== Etymology ==
The name Scrotifera, coined by Peter Waddell of the Institute of Statistical Mathematics, comes "from the word scrotum, a pouch in which the testes permanently reside in the adult male". It was chosen due to the presence of a postpenile scrotum in all members of Scrotifera, with the exception of some aquatic forms and pangolins.

== Description ==
Scrotifera is an evolutionary lineage, or clade, of placental mammals that includes ungulates, bats, carnivorans, and pangolins, as well as their common ancestors. It was discovered through phylogenetic analyses and is one of the well-established mammalian clades, recovered by practically all comprehensive analyses.

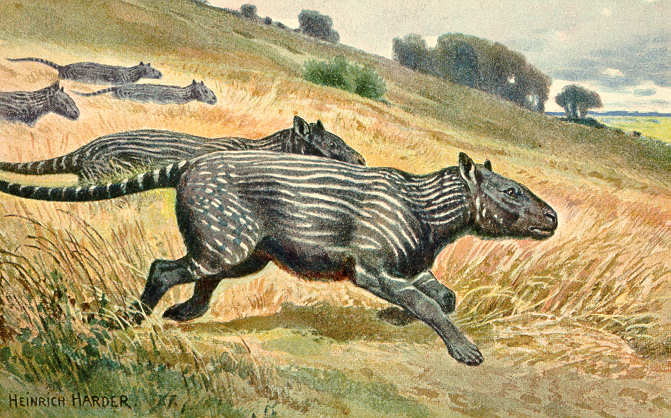
The common ancestor of Scrotifera might have been similar to Phenacodus, an early ungulate, in terms of body dimensions and life history (precociality in particular).

Several characteristics likely present in the common ancestor of scrotiferans have been reconstructed based on the biological traits of its modern descendants. For example, this ancestor was probably a diurnal animal, as inferred from the positive selection of phototransduction genes associated with bright-light vision. After the divergence between the major scrotiferan groups, carnivorans and ungulates generally entered an evolutionary arms race of opposite daily activity patterns (as nocturnal predators and diurnal herbivores, respectively), while bats and pangolins became entirely nocturnal.

In addition, reconstructions of the embryonic development of scrotiferans show that all organs develop considerably earlier in comparison to other mammals such as rodents. Like most of its descendants, the scrotiferan ancestor was precocial (i.e., born with relative maturity and independence), while certain descendants such as the carnivores then became more altricial (requiring significant parental care).

At least two anatomical features are known to have been present in the scrotiferan ancestor. One feature, after which the group is named, is the postpenile scrotum, a pouch in the adult male that permanently contains the testes, often prominently displayed; other mammal orders generally lack this trait, and among scrotiferans, pangolins and aquatic forms (like cetaceans) secondarily reduced it. Another is a well-developed entotympanic, an ear bone, although it was secondarily lost in even-toed ungulates. Otherwise, due to the rapid radiation of placental mammals, the morphology of early scrotiferans was probably very similar to that of early members of the closely related eulipotyphlans and euarchontoglires. Morphological evolution is predicted to have occurred very slowly on those lineages compared to the molecular (genetic) evolution, and only accelerated with the divergence of the different orders.

== Classification and phylogeny ==
=== History of phylogeny ===
In 2006, the clade Pegasoferae (a clade of mammals that includes orders Chiroptera, Carnivora, Perissodactyla and Pholidota) was proposed as part of the clade Scrotifera and a sister group to the order Artiodactyla, based on genomic research in molecular systematics. The monophyly of the group is not well supported, and recent studies have indicated that this clade is not a natural grouping.

According to a 2022 study, two extinct species (Eosoricodon terrigena and "Wyonycteris" microtis) were identified as outside of the family Nyctitheriidae and more closely related mammals to bats. In another 2022 study, the extinct genus Acmeodon was recognized as not a member of the extinct order Cimolesta but a basal laurasiatherian mammal in the clade Scrotifera.

=== Taxonomy ===
Former classification (Nishihara, 2006):	Current classification:
Clade: Scrotifera (Waddell, 1999); Order: Artiodactyla (Owen, 1848) (even-toed ungulates); Clade: Pegasoferae (Nishihara, 2006); Order: Chiroptera (Blumenbach, 1779) (bats); Clade: Zooamata (Waddell, 1999); Miroder: Ferae (Linnaeus, 1758); Order: Perissodactyla (Owen, 1848) (odd-toed ungulates)	Clade: Scrotifera (Waddell, 1999); Grandorder: Ferungulata (Simpson, 1945); Mirorder: Ferae (Linnaeus, 1758); Clade: Pan-Euungulata (O'Leary, 2013); Clade: Apo-Chiroptera (Cirranello, Simmons & Gunnell, 2020) (bats); Family: †Eosoricodontidae (Lopatin, 2005); Genus: †Acmeodon (Matthew & Granger, 1921); Genus: †Avunculus (Van Valen, 1966); Genus: †Gelastops (Simpson, 1935); Incertae sedis: †"Wyonycteris" microtis (Secord, 2008)

== See also ==
- Mammal classification
- Laurasiatheria
