= Saccopharynx berteli =

Conservation status
- Data Deficient (IUCN 3.1)

Scientific classification
- Kingdom: Animalia
- Phylum: Chordata
- Class: Actinopterygii
- Order: Anguilliformes
- Family: Saccopharyngidae
- Genus: Saccopharynx
- Species: S. berteli

Binomial name
- Saccopharynx berteli Tighe & Nielsen, 2000

Species of fish

Saccopharynx berteli is a species of ray-finned fish within the family Saccopharyngidae. It is known from a single holotype collected from the central Pacific Ocean through an open fishing net at a depth of 1,100 metres (3,600 ft) in 1977. The individual caught was an immature male with a length of 89.5 centimetres (35.2 in). It has been classified as a 'Data deficient' species by the IUCN Red List as there is little information regarding its population, ecology, distribution, and potential threats. It differs from the other nine species in the genus in morphometric characters, principally including the extreme elongation of the caudal region (88.5% of TL) compared with 71–82% in the other species.
