= Saccopharynx paucovertebratis =

Conservation status
- Data Deficient (IUCN 3.1)

Scientific classification
- Kingdom: Animalia
- Phylum: Chordata
- Class: Actinopterygii
- Order: Anguilliformes
- Family: Saccopharyngidae
- Genus: Saccopharynx
- Species: S. paucovertebratis

Binomial name
- Saccopharynx paucovertebratis Nielsen & Bertelsen, 1985

Species of fish

Saccopharynx paucovertebratis is a species of ray-finned fish within the family Saccopharyngidae. The species is known from a single a single holotype collected from a fishing trawl west of Madeira in the Atlantic Ocean at a depth up to 1,700 m (5,600 ft) in 1931. The holotype was measured at 30.5 centimetres (12 in) in length. The IUCN Red List has assessed the species as 'Data deficient' as there is there is little information regarding population, ecology, distribution, and potential threats.
