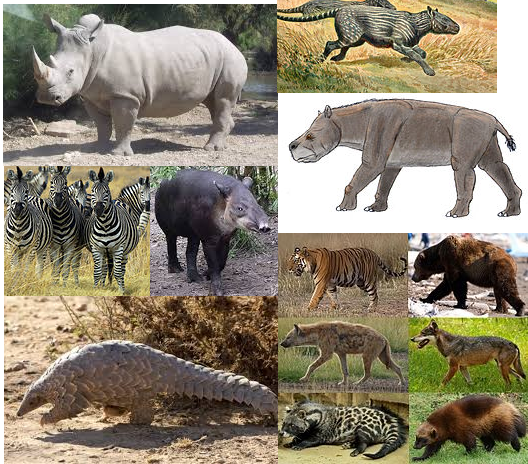

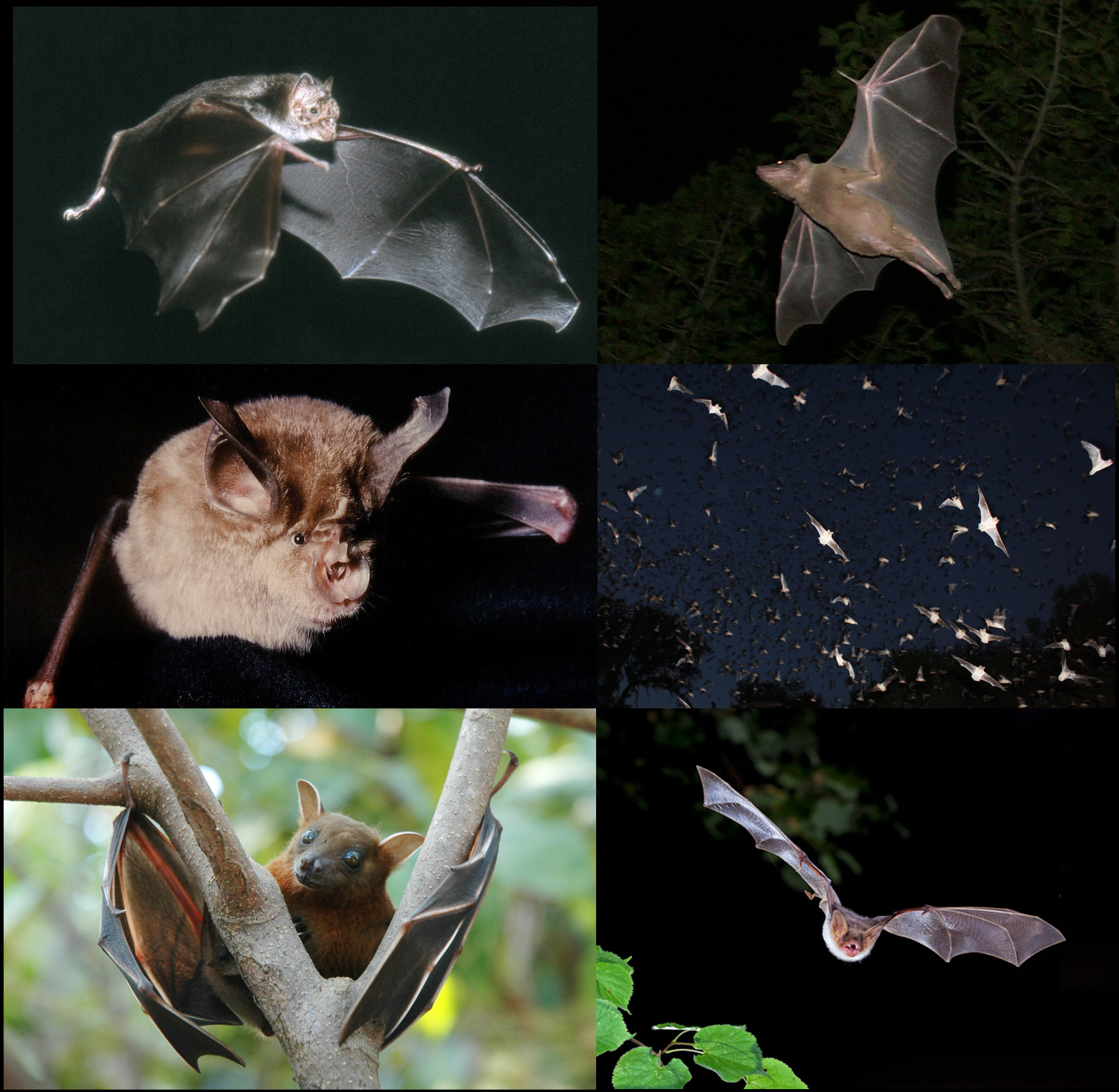

Scientific classification
- Domain: Eukaryota
- Kingdom: Animalia
- Phylum: Chordata
- Class: Mammalia
- Superorder: Laurasiatheria
- Clade: Scrotifera
- Clade: Pegasoferae; Nishihara, 2006

Subgroups
- Order: Chiroptera; Clade: Zooamata

= Pegasoferae =

Pegasoferae Temporal range: early Paleocene to present

Group of mammals comprising horses, bats, carnivores, and pangolins, among others

Pegasoferae ("winged beast") is a proposed clade of mammals based on genomic research in molecular systematics by Nishihara, Hasegawa and Okada (2006).

To the surprise of the authors, their data led them to propose a clade that includes bats (order Chiroptera), carnivores such as cats and dogs (order Carnivora), horses and other odd-toed ungulates (order Perissodactyla) and pangolins (order Pholidota) as springing from a single evolutionary origin within the mammals.

The name Pegasoferae was coined from the name of the mythological flying horse Pegasus to refer to bats and horses, and the term Ferae, encompassing carnivorans and pangolins. According to this, the odd-toed ungulates' closest living relatives are the carnivorans. Earlier theories of mammalian evolution would, for example, have aligned bats with the insectivores (order Eulipotyphla) and horses with the even-toed ungulates (order Artiodactyla).

Some subsequent molecular studies published shortly afterwards have failed to support it. In particular, two recent studies, each combining genome-wide analyses of multiple taxa with testing of competing alternative phylogenetic hypotheses, concluded that Pegasoferae is not a natural grouping.

== Phylogeny ==
The following cladogram shows the phylogenetic relationships of laurasiatherian mammals following Nishihara et al. (2006).

- Laurasiatheria
  - Eulipotyphla
  - Scrotifera
    - Artiodactyla
    - Pegasoferae
      - Chiroptera
      - Zooamata
        - Ferae
        - Perissodactyla
