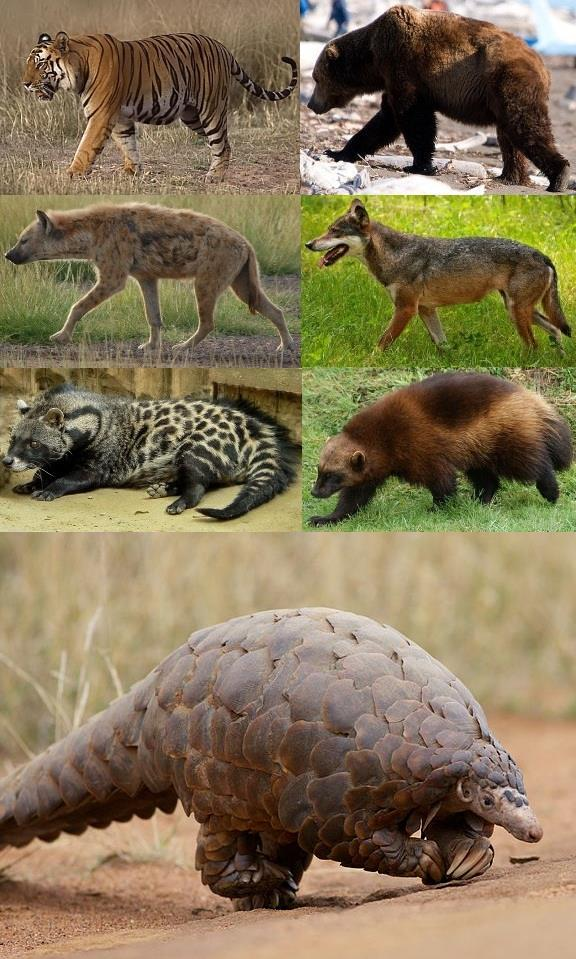

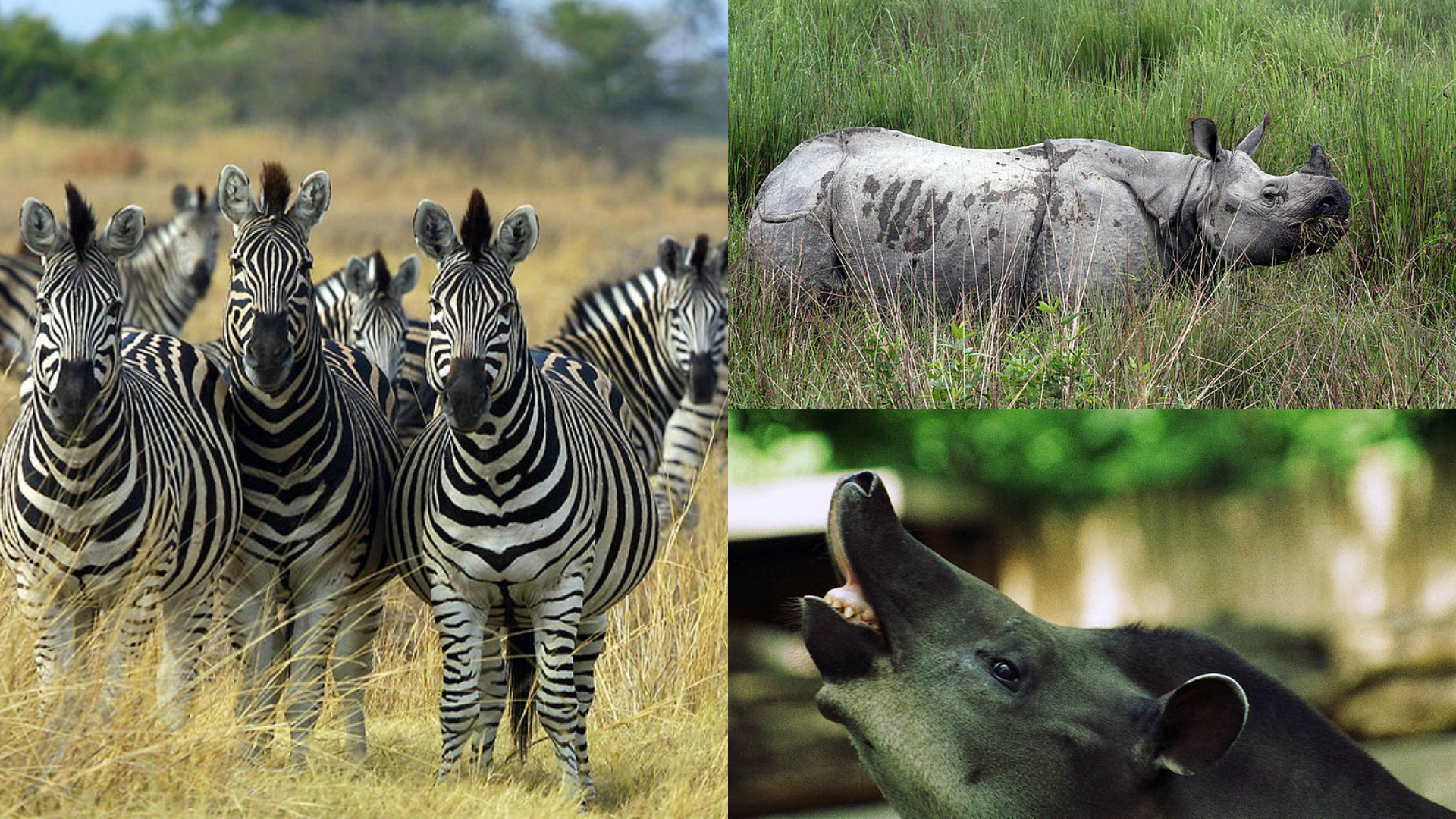

Scientific classification
- Kingdom: Animalia
- Phylum: Chordata
- Class: Mammalia
- Infraclass: Placentalia
- Clade: Scrotifera
- Clade: Pegasoferae
- Clade: Zooamata; Waddell, 1999

Subgroups
- Mirorder: Ferae; Order: Perissodactyla

= Zooamata =

Zooamata Temporal range: early Paleocene to present

Group of mammals comprising horses, dogs, and pangolins, among others

Zooamata ("animal friends") is a proposal for a clade of mammals uniting the Ferae (carnivores and pangolins) with the Perissodactyla (odd-toed ungulates).

Zoomata was proposed as one of the competing arrangements for the interordinal relationships of placental mammals within Laurasiatheria. It received support in a phylogenetic study using retroposon insertion analysis, where it was found to be the sister taxon to Chiroptera within a novel clade named Pegasoferae. The Zooamata and Cetartiodactyla (even-toed ungulates and whales) together form Scrotifera.

The name of this clade is constructed from Greek and Latin to mean "animal friends", a reference to the inclusion of cats, dogs, and horses, all of which have been domesticated by humans.

Subsequent molecular studies have generally failed to support the proposal. In particular, two recent phylogenomic studies analysing alternative theories for mammalian interordinal relationships concluded that Zooamata and Pegasoferae are not natural groupings. The competing proposal linking the Perissodactyla and Cetartiodactyla in a clade named Euungulata, as a sister to the Ferae, in Scrotifera received stronger support.

== Phylogeny ==
The following cladogram shows the phylogenetic relationships of laurasiatherian mammals following Nishihara et al. (2006).

- Laurasiatheria
  - Eulipotyphla
  - Scrotifera
    - Artiodactyla
    - Pegasoferae
      - Chiroptera
      - Zooamata
        - Ferae
        - Perissodactyla
