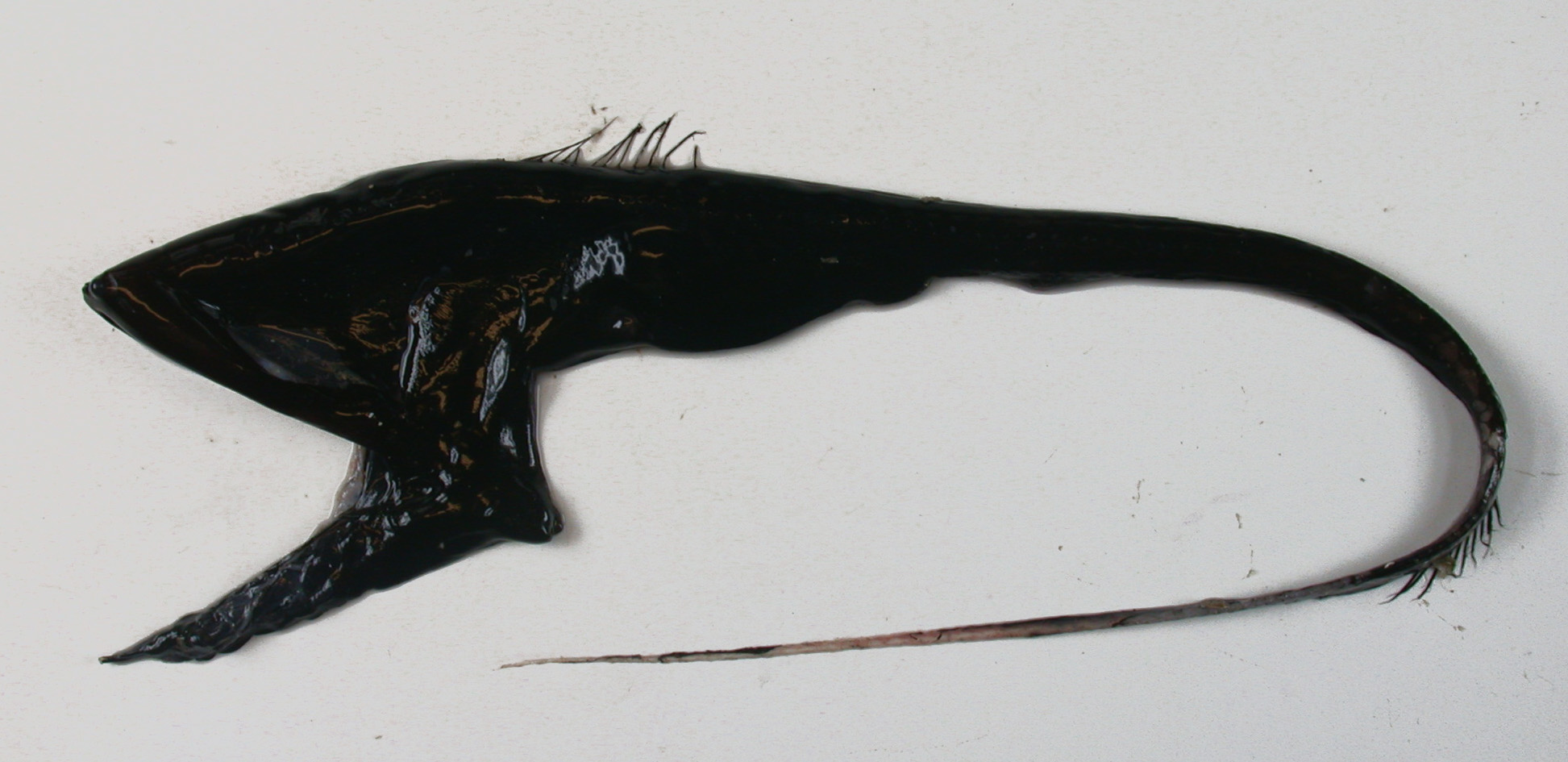
- Pelican eel (Eurypharynx pelecanoides)

Scientific classification
- Kingdom: Animalia
- Phylum: Chordata
- Class: Actinopterygii
- Division: Teleostei
- Superorder: Elopomorpha
- Order: Saccopharyngiformes; Poulsen, 2018

Families
- See text

= Saccopharyngiforms =

Order of fishes

The Saccopharyngiformes are a derived lineage of unusual eels within the order Anguilliformes, and includes families Cyematidae, Monognathidae, Eurypharyngidae, Saccopharyngidae, and the proposed family Neocyematidae. Most of the fish in this group are deep-dwelling and rarely seen, typically known from only a handful of specimens. Species include recognizable fish such as pelican eels (also commonly known as gulper eels) and bobtail eels. Some can live deep in the ocean, well into the aphotic zone, approximately 500 to 1,800 meters (1,600 to 5,900 ft) deep. Extensive research has not been conducted on them due to being indirectly observed, with some species known only from their larvae. All families except for the exceptionally rare individuals of proposed family Neoceymatidae (known only from the Atlantic Ocean) are found in all major oceans.

== Description ==
They have multiple internal differences from the rest of Anguilliformes. Notably, they have no symplectic bone, opercular bones, ribs, or swim bladders. Like many other eels, they lack scales and pelvic fins. Their myomeres (muscle segments) are V-shaped instead of W-shaped as in all other fishes, and their lateral lines have no pores, instead being modified to groups of elevated tubules. The jaws are quite large, lined with small teeth, and several types are notable for being able to consume fish larger than themselves. Some species in families Eurypharyngidae and Saccopharyngidae are bioluminescent.

Like other eels, saccopharyngids have leptocephalus larvae. However, these larvae also have a number of unusual characteristics, such as remarkably deep bodies in the Cyematidae, long lower jaws in the Eurypharyngidae, and unique pigmented swellings at the ends of the gut in Saccopharyngidae and Eurypharyngidae.

The three established families of the suborder Saccopharyngoidei (Eupharyngidae, Monognathidae, Saccopharyngidae) all exhibit sexual dimorphism.

== Taxonomy ==
Until recently, the order "Saccopharyngiformes" was accepted as a separate order from Anguilliformes, based on their distinct morphological differences from the rest of the "true eels". Genetic work over the past few years has shown that it is instead a derived lineage within the Anguilliformes.

The four (proposed five) families in two suborders are:

- Suborder Cyematoidei
  - Cyematidae (bobtail snipe eels)
- Suborder Saccopharyngoidei
  - Eurypharyngidae (gulpers)
  - Monognathidae (one-jaws)
  - Saccopharyngidae (swallowers)
  - Neocyematidae (proposed)
