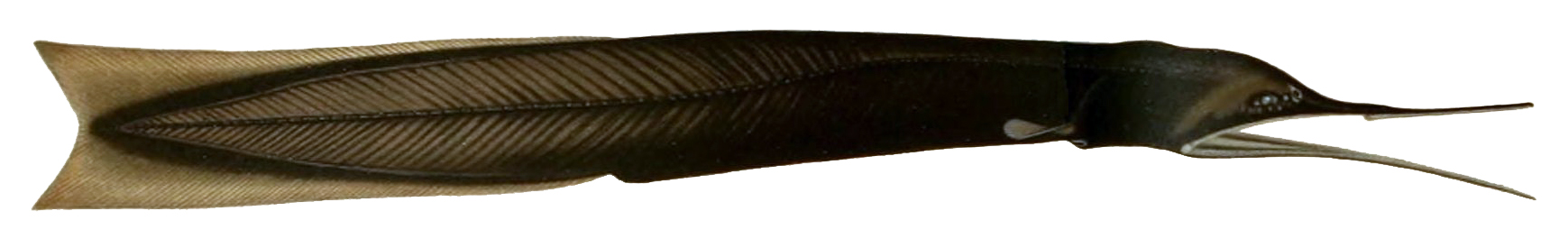

Conservation status
- Least Concern (IUCN 3.1)

Scientific classification
- Kingdom: Animalia
- Phylum: Chordata
- Class: Actinopterygii
- Order: Anguilliformes
- Suborder: Anguilloidei
- Family: Cyematidae; Regan, 1912
- Genus: Cyema; Günther, 1878
- Species: C. atrum

Binomial name
- Cyema atrum Günther, 1878

= Cyema =

Monotypic genus of fish

Cyema is a monospecific genus of marine ray-finned fish belonging to the monotypic family Cyematidae. The only species in the genus is Cyema atrum, the arrow eel, bobtail eel, bobtail snipe eel or deepwater eel. This species has circumglobal distribution.

== Taxonomy ==
Cyema was first proposed as a genus in 1878 by the German-born British ichthyologist Albert Günther when he described its only species Cyema atrum. The type locality of C. atrum was given as the South Pacific from Challenger station 295 from a depths of 1,500 fathoms (9,000 ft; 2,700 m) and the Antarctic Ocean from Challenger station 158 from a depth of 1,800 fathoms (10,800 ft; 3,300 m). In 1912 Charles Tate Regan classified this genus in the family Cyematidae, this genus is the only genus classified in that family. Formerly, the genus Neocyema was classified within this family but it is now classified in the family Neocyematidae. This family is classified within the suborder Anguilloidei of the eel order Anguilliformes.

== Etymology ==
Cyema is derived from the Greek word kýēma (Gr. κύημα), which means "that which is conceived", in other words and embryo or foetus, an allusion Günther did not explain but it is likely to be an allusion to this taxon having a soft body like that of a leptocephalus. The specific name atrum is the neuter of ater, a Latin word meaning "black", a reference to the plain black colour of this eel.

== Description ==
Cyema has a compressed body with its anus in the middle, the trunk and the tail are of equal length. It has delicate, elongated jaws that resemble the beak of a bird. It has tiny, closely set teeth with recurved points on the jaws and on the vomer. The front nostrils are tubular while the rear nostrils resemble pores, closely set and jus to the front of the eyes. The small gill openings are just under the base of the pectoral fins. The dorsal and anal fins are large, originating just to the rear of the anus, getting taller to the rear and with their rear ends projecting past the caudal fin as a pair of lobes. The caudal fin consists of a small number of small rays. There are no pelvic fins. It is a uniform dark velvety brown or purplish-black. This species has a maximum published total length of 15 cm (5.9 in), although 13 cm (5.1 in) is more typical.

== Distribution and habitat ==
Cyema is found in all the oceans. In the Atlantic Ocean, it as far north as the waters off southwestern Greenland and at the southern boundary of the Irminger Sea. In the eastern Atlanticis occurs from off the coast of Portugal and Gibraltar west to the Azores and Madeira, south to South Africa. In the western Atlantic, itv occurs from off eastern Canada south to Bermuda, as well as having been recorded off Brazil and Argentina, although it is absent from the Gulf of Mexico, the Caribbean Sea or the Sargasso Sea. It is also found in the Indian Ocean off Somalia and in the central Indian Ocean extendingg east to Australia and New Zealand. The snipe eel has been recorded off southern Japan and in the Eastern Pacific, from British Columbia and Oregon south to Panama and Chile. It is a Mesopelagic and bathypelagic fish found at depths between 330 and 5,100 m (1,080 and 16,730 ft), typically deeper than 610 m (2,000 ft).

== Biology ==
Cyema is a little known fish but it is carnivorous. It is also oviparous and has a leptocephalus larva.
