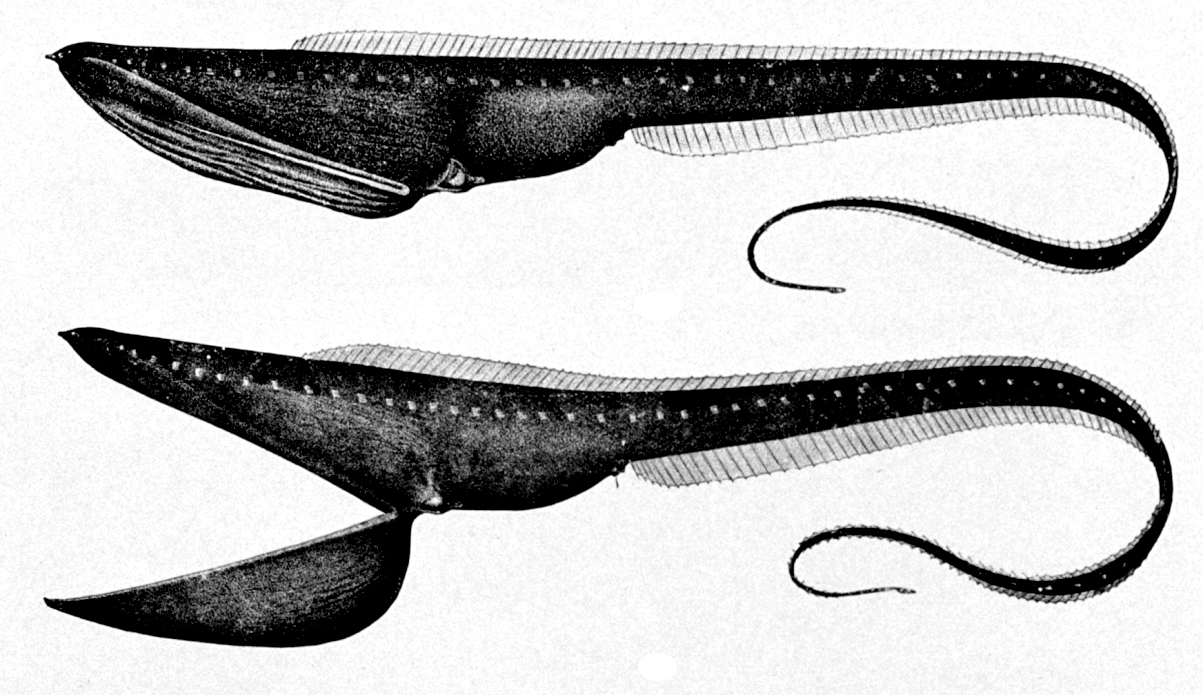
- The mouth of the pelican eel can open wide enough to swallow prey much larger than the eel itself

Conservation status
- Least Concern (IUCN 3.1)

- Secure (NatureServe)

Scientific classification
- Kingdom: Animalia
- Phylum: Chordata
- Class: Actinopterygii
- Division: Teleostei
- Order: Anguilliformes
- Family: Eurypharyngidae; Gill, 1883
- Genus: Eurypharynx; Vaillant, 1882
- Species: E. pelecanoides

Binomial name
- Eurypharynx pelecanoides Vaillant, 1882

Synonyms
- Gastrostomus pacificus Macropharynx longicaudatus Gastrostomus bairdii Eurypharynx richardi Leptocephalus pseudolatissimus

= Pelican eel =

Species of fish

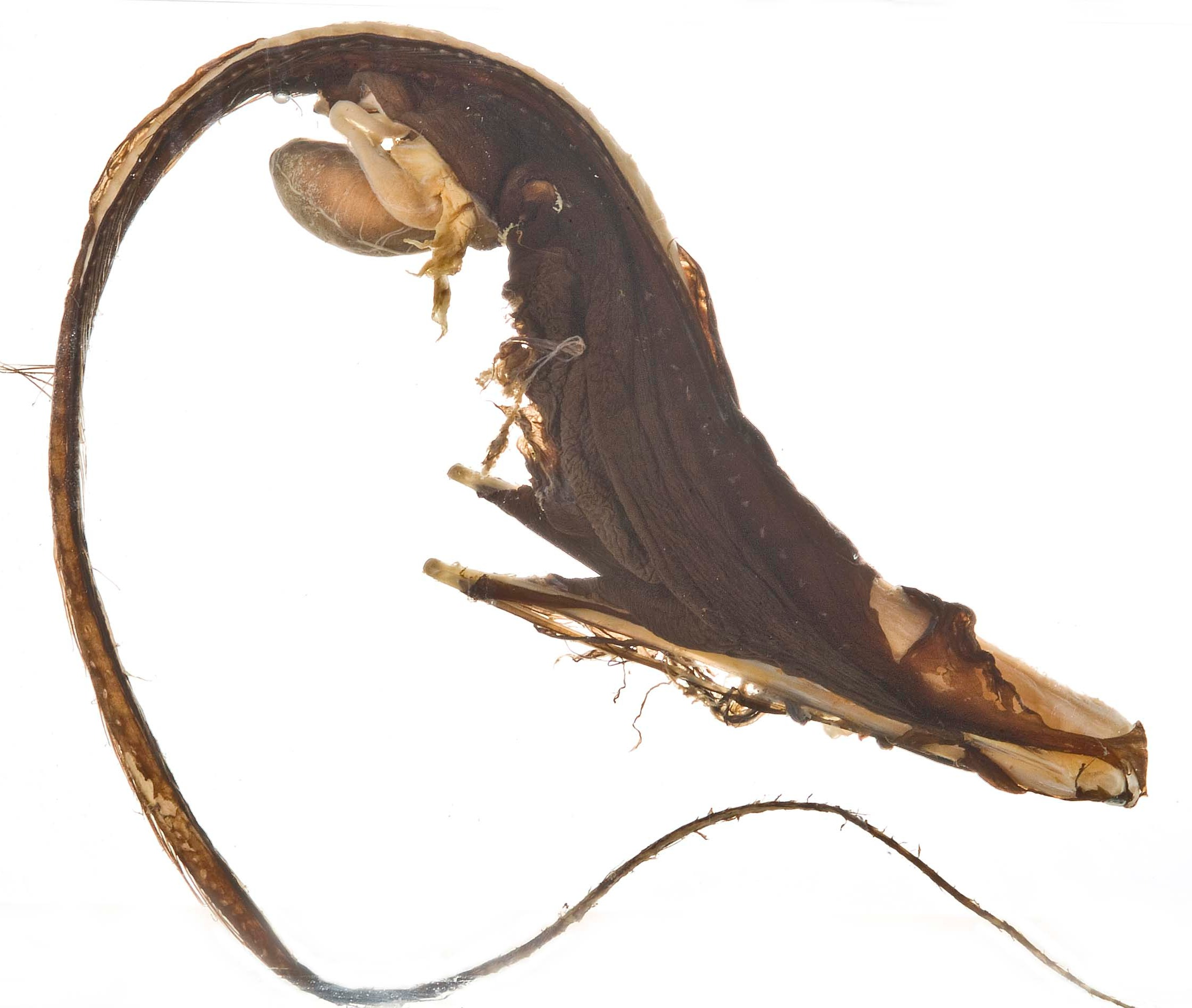
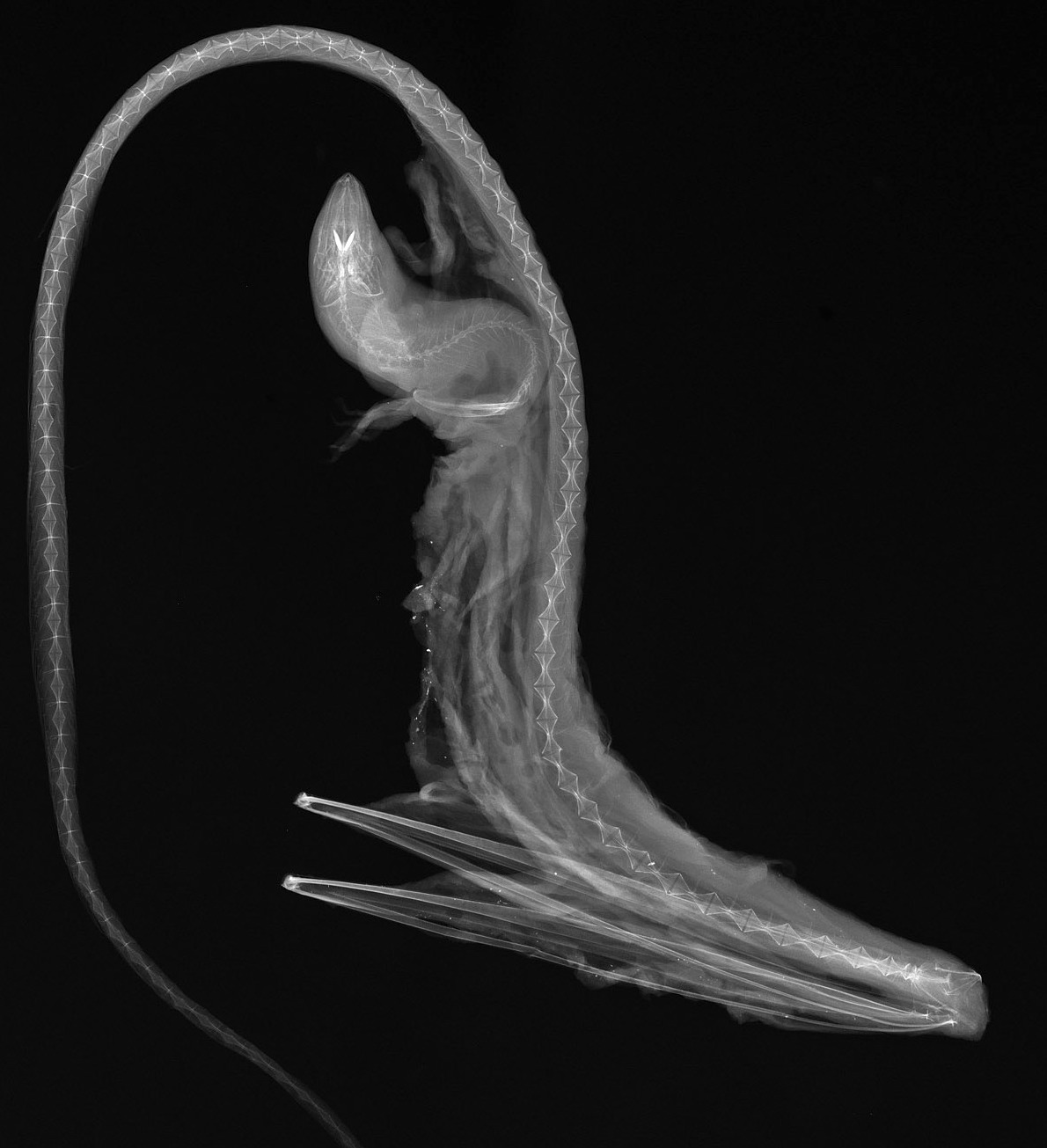
Conventional and X-ray images of preserved Eurypharynx pelecanoides

The pelican eel (Eurypharynx pelecanoides) is a deep-sea eel. It is the only known member of the genus Eurypharynx and the family Eurypharyngidae. The species belongs to the "saccopharyngiforms", members of which were historically placed in their own order, but are now considered true eels in the order Anguilliformes. The pelican eel has been described by many synonyms, yet nobody has been able to demonstrate that more than one species of pelican eel exists. It is also referred to as the gulper eel (which can also refer to members of the related genus Saccopharynx), pelican gulper, and umbrella-mouth gulper. The specific epithet pelecanoides refers to the pelican, as the fish's large mouth is reminiscent of that of the pelican.

== Description ==
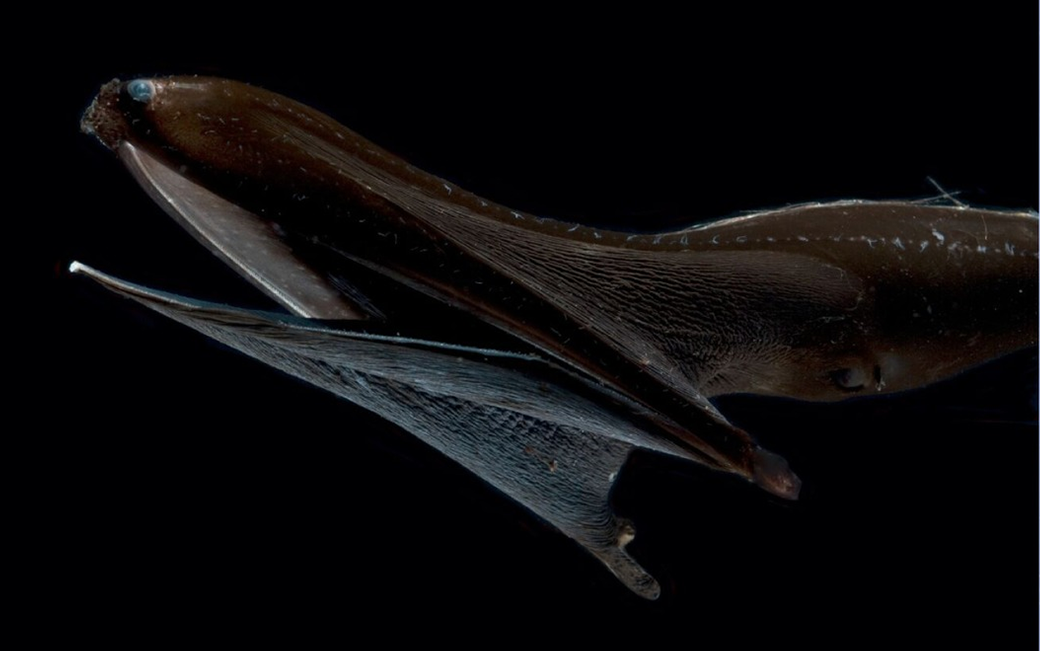
Head of a pelican eel

The morphology of pelican eel specimens is difficult to describe because they are so fragile that they become damaged when they are recovered from the deep sea's immense pressure. However, certain observations about the physical characteristics have been noted from studied specimen.

The pelican eel's most notable feature is its large mouth, which is much larger than its body. The mouth is loosely hinged, and can be opened wide enough to swallow a fish much larger than the eel itself. The lower jaw is hinged at the base of the head, with no body mass behind it, making the head look disproportionately large. Its jaw is so large that it is estimated to be about a quarter of the total length of the eel itself.

While typically in a folded state, the pelican eel's mouth has the capacity to change to an inflated shape when hunting, giving the mouth a massive appearance. This transformation is possible due to the dual-mode biological morphing mechanism that takes place: geometric unfolding of the mouth followed by stretching. When the pelican eel is in pursuit of prey and opens its mouth, the head and jaw structure unfold and spread horizontally, followed by the inflation of the mouth. The inflation is made possible given the highly stretchable skin of the head, an additional characteristic that enables the eel to partake in this mechanism and engage in lunge feeding to consume large amounts of prey. When it feeds on prey, water that is ingested is expelled via the gills.

Pelican eels are smaller-sized eels. They grow to about 0.75 m (2.5 ft) in length, though lengths of 1 m (3 ft 3 in) are plausible. Like most eels, E. pelecanoides lacks pelvic fins and scales. Otherwise, the pelican eel is very different in appearance from typical eels. Instead of having a swim bladder, the pelican eel has an aglomerular kidney that is thought to have a role in maintaining the gelatinous substance filling the "lymphatic spaces" that are found around the vertebrae. It has been hypothesized that these gelatinous substance filled "lymphatic spaces" function in a similar way to a swim bladder. Furthermore, the muscle segment shape of the pelican eel is different. Its muscle segments have a "V-shape", while other fish have "W-shaped" muscle segments. Pelican eels are also unusual because the ampullae of the lateral line system project from the body, rather than being contained in a narrow groove; this may increase its sensitivity.

Unlike many other deep sea creatures, the pelican eel has very small eyes. For reference, the horizontal eye size diameter of a male pelican eel specimen was measured to be 2.6 mm (0.10 in). It is believed that the eyes evolved to detect faint traces of light rather than form images.

The pelican eel has a long, whip-like tail that it uses for movement and for communication via bioluminescence. Specimens that have been brought to the surface in fishing nets have been known to have their long tails tied into several knots. The end of the tail bears a complex organ with numerous tentacles, which glows pink and gives off occasional red flashes. The colors on its tail are displayed through its light-emitting photophores. This is presumably a lure to attract prey, although its presence at the far end of the body from the mouth suggests the eel may have to adopt an unusual posture to use it effectively.

Pelican eels are black or olive and some subspecies may have a thin lateral white stripe. The coloration of E. pelecanoides is especially dark because the species exhibits ultra-black camouflage. This special pigmentation, which reflects less than 0.5% of light, allows these eels to be cloaked in darkness in their low light environments. The black camouflage allows bathypelagic eels to evade predators and hide from prey.

Pelican eels display sexual dimorphism, with the largest morphological difference in the structure of the nasal rosette. In female pelican eels, the nasal rosette is hardly noticeable whereas male pelican eels exhibit a larger nasal rosette. The male's nasal rosette is bulb-shaped and contains larger anterior and posterior nostrils. Sexual dimorphism is thought to aid with locating a potential mate in the bathypelagic zone.

== Feeding habits and diet ==
Pelican eels have developed adaptations and feeding patterns to help them survive in their low biomass environment. Studies have shown that pelican eels are active participants in their pursuit of food, rather than passively waiting for prey to fall into their large mouths. They are hypothesized to exhibit lunge-feeding through the expansion of their mandible and upper jaw. Furthermore, their stomach can stretch and expand to accommodate large meals, although analysis of stomach contents suggests they primarily eat small crustaceans. Despite the great size of the jaws, which occupy about a quarter of the animal's total length, it has only tiny teeth, which would not be consistent with a regular diet of large fish. The large mouth may be an adaptation to allow the eel to eat a wider variety of prey when food is scarce. The eel can swim into large groups of shrimp or other crustaceans with its mouth closed, opening wide as it closely approaches prey, scooping them up to be swallowed. The pelican eel is also known to feed on cephalopods (squid) and other small invertebrates. When the eel consumes prey, it also takes in a large amount of water, which is then slowly expelled through its gill slits. Pelican eels themselves are preyed upon by lancetfish and other deep sea predators. The pelican eel is not known to undergo vertical diurnal migration like other eels.

Observations of gut contents and teeth morphology indicate that Eurypharynx pelecanoides larva, categorized as a type of leptocephali, feed on marine snow. Organisms, such as thraustochytrids and hydrozoan tissue, were consumed by these larva in a grouped manner such as they would be found in marine snow. Furthermore, the lesser number, larger size, and inwardly-pointing direction of leptocephali larval teeth point indicate that pelican eel larva rely on marine snow as a source of nutrients. As leptocephali develop into their mature form these distinct teeth were replaced by more, smaller teeth. This particular observation may explain a shift in the size of leptocephali heads, such as E. pelecanoides, in comparison to their food source as they mature.

== Reproduction and life cycle ==
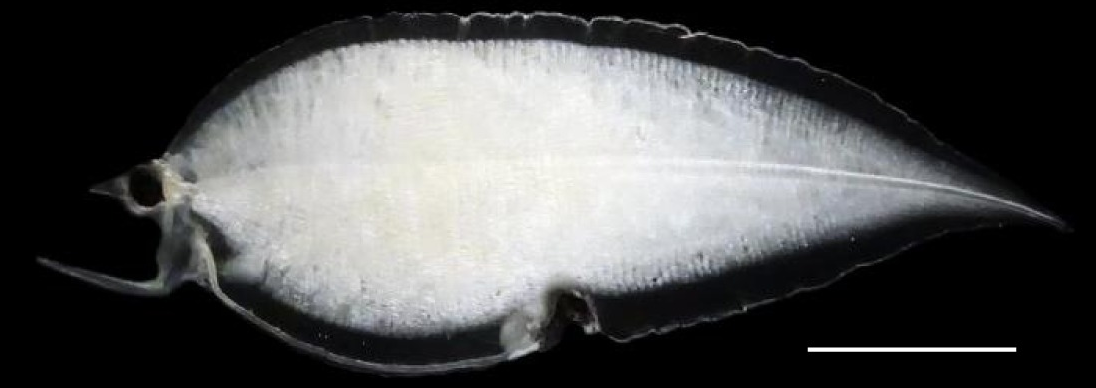
Pelican eel larva

Not much is known about the reproductive habits of the pelican eel. Similar to other eels, when pelican eels are first born, they start in the leptocephalus stage, meaning that they are extremely thin and transparent. Until they reach their juvenile stage, they have small organs and no red blood cells. As they mature, the males undergo a change that causes enlargement of the olfactory organs, responsible for the sense of smell, and degeneration of the teeth and jaws. The males also have defined reproductive organs. In a studied male, the testes occupied a majority of the space in the stomach cavity where the stomach had seemed to have shrunk. The females, on the other hand, remain relatively unchanged as they mature. The large olfactory organs in the sexually-mature males indicates that they may locate their mates through pheromones released by the females. Many researchers believe that the eels die shortly after reproduction. Reproducing later in life is thought to be a strategy that increases the likelihood of offspring survival for E. pelecanoides.

== Distribution and habitat ==
The pelican eel has been found in the temperate and tropical areas of all oceans. In the North Atlantic, it seems to have a range in depth from 500 to 3,000 m (1,600 to 9,800 ft). One Canadian-arctic specimen was found in Davis Strait at a depth of 1,136–1,154 m (3,727–3,786 ft), and also across the coasts of Greenland. Pelican eels have also been spotted off the coast of Portugal, as well as near the Hawaiian islands.

== Interactions with humans ==
Because of the extreme depths at which it lives, most of what is known about the pelican eel comes from specimens that are inadvertently caught in deep sea fishing nets. Although once regarded as a purely deep-sea species, since 1970, hundreds of specimens have been caught by fishermen, mostly in the Atlantic Ocean. In October 2018, the first direct observation of a gulper eel was made by a group of researchers near the Azores. The team witnessed the aggressive nature of the eel's hunting process, as it was constantly moving around in the water column to attempt to find prey. In September 2018, the E/V Nautilus team witnessed a juvenile gulper eel inflating its mouth in attempt to catch prey in the Papahānaumokuākea Marine National Monument (PMNM). Until these explorations, the behavior of gulper eels had not been extensively analyzed.

== Phylogenetic relationship to other species ==
In 2003, researchers from the University of Tokyo sequenced mitochondrial DNA (mtDNA) from specimens of Eurypharynx pelicanoides and Saccopharynx lavenbergi. After comparing the sequences from the specimens with other known sequences, specifically the non-coding regions, they found that E. pelicanoides and S. lavenbergi were closely related and genetically distinct from anguilliformes due to the high frequency of similarity on these regions.

== See also ==
- Saccopharyngiformes
- Neocyema
