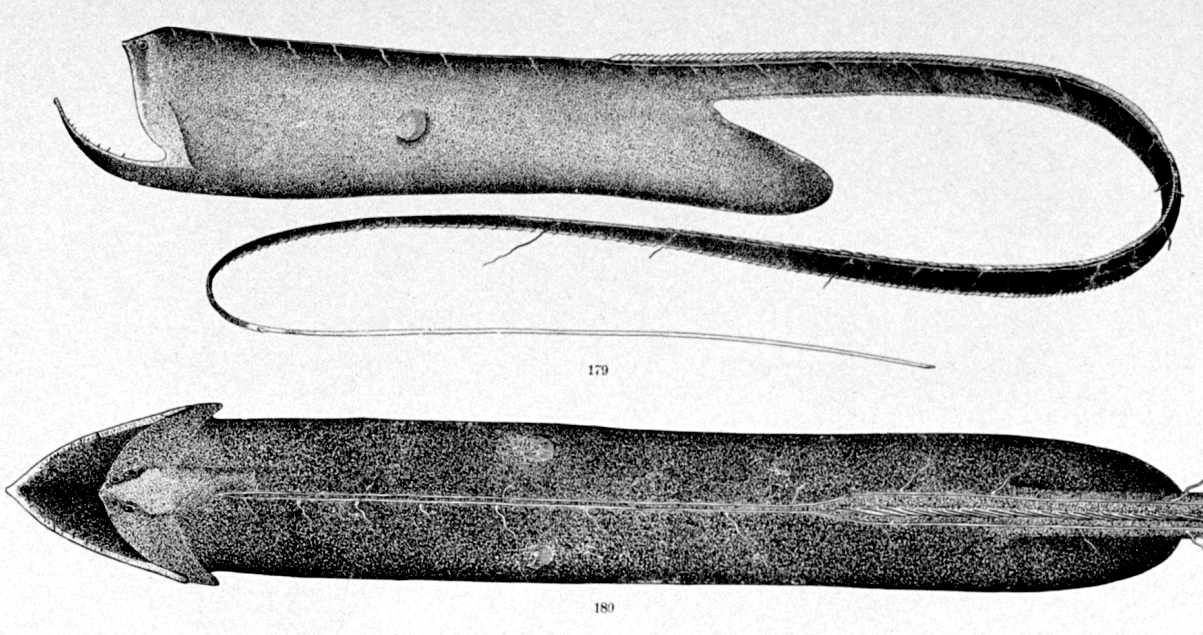
- Saccopharynx ampullaceus. From plate 49 of Oceanic Ichthyology by George Brown Goode and Tarleton Hoffman Bean, published 1896.

Scientific classification
- Kingdom: Animalia
- Phylum: Chordata
- Class: Actinopterygii
- Division: Teleostei
- Order: Anguilliformes
- Suborder: Anguilloidei
- Family: Saccopharyngidae; Bleeker, 1859
- Genus: Saccopharynx; Mitchill, 1824

Type species
- Saccopharynx ampullaceus Harwood, 1827

Species
- See text

= Saccopharynx =

Genus of fishes

Saccopharynx is a genus of deep-sea eels with large mouths, distensible stomachs and long, scaleless bodies. Commonly, these fish are called gulpers or gulper eels. It is the only genus in the family Saccopharyngidae, and is part of the derived lineage of the "saccopharyngiforms," which includes other mid-water eel species. The name is from Latin saccus meaning "sack" and Greek φάρυγξ, pharynx.

They are generally black in color and can grow to lengths of 2 m (6.5 feet). They have been found at depths of 1,800 metres (5,900 ft), and are known to inhabit the eastern and western Atlantic Ocean and the Gulf Stream. Their tails are tipped by a luminous, bulb-shaped organ. The exact purpose of this organ is unknown, although it is most likely used as a lure, similar to the esca of anglerfish. Unlike pelican eels (Eurypharyngidae), gulper eel diets are largely thought to consist of fish; a specimen of Saccopharynx lavenbergi was recovered with the digested skull bones of an Oneirodes anglerfish.

== Species ==
The genus has ten recognized species:

- Saccopharynx ampullaceus Harwood, 1827 (Gulper eel)
- Saccopharynx berteli Tighe & J. G. Nielsen, 2000
- Saccopharynx harrisoni Beebe, 1932
- Saccopharynx hjorti Bertin, 1938
- Saccopharynx lavenbergi J. G. Nielsen & Bertelsen, 1985
- Saccopharynx paucovertebratis J. G. Nielsen & Bertelsen, 1985
- Saccopharynx ramosus J. G. Nielsen & Bertelsen, 1985
- Saccopharynx schmidti Bertin, 1934 (Whiptail gulper)
- Saccopharynx thalassa J. G. Nielsen & Bertelsen, 1985
- Saccopharynx trilobatus J. G. Nielsen & Bertelsen, 1985
