= Neocyema =

Conservation status
- Least Concern (IUCN 3.1)

Scientific classification
- Kingdom: Animalia
- Phylum: Chordata
- Class: Actinopterygii
- Order: Anguilliformes
- Suborder: Anguilloidei
- Family: Neocyematidae; Poulsen et al., 2018
- Genus: Neocyema; Castle, 1978
- Species: N. erythrosoma

Binomial name
- Neocyema erythrosoma Castle, 1978

Genus of fishes

Neocyema erythrosoma is a species of pelagic fish, a deep-water bobtail snipe eel in the family Neocyematidae. It is the only member of its genus, Neocyema. It was first described by Peter Castle in 1978 after two specimens were caught at great depths in the south Atlantic Ocean in 1971. Further specimens have since been caught in the North Atlantic.

== Description ==
Neocyema erythrosoma has an elongated arrow-shaped body and grows to a maximum length of 16 centimetres (6.3 in). It is laterally compressed and has a long narrow snout with delicate, fine-boned jaws and small teeth. The eyes are also small and the whole fish is a bright orange-red colour. N. erythrosoma has transparent skin, which leaves the myomeres, its bands of muscle, visible. The skeleton lacks a number of bones that are found in other ray-finned fish; there is no opercular bones or pectoral girdle and only a single branchial arch.

== Distribution ==
Initially, Neocyema erythrosoma was only known from the southeast Atlantic Ocean near South Africa where, in 1971, the first two specimens were caught at depths of between 2,000 and 2,200 metres (6,600 and 7,200 ft). In 2006, during a deep water NOAA National Marine Fisheries Service biodiversity survey, a research vessel collected a further specimen near the Bear Seamount off the coast of New England at a depth of about 2,284 metres (7,493 ft). In 2008, a Canadian Department of Fisheries and Oceans research vessel caught another specimen in the Gully Marine Protected Area east of Nova Scotia, at a depth of about 1,620 metres (5,310 ft). The locations of these two further finds were the first for the species in the North Atlantic and were both areas in which hundreds of research trawls had been made previously. The fact that the species had not been caught at an earlier date demonstrates its great rarity.

== Larval form ==
In 1909, Schmidt described a larval form of an eel that had been found in the northeast Atlantic and named it Leptocephalus holti. In 1974, Raju described a similar larval eel from the Pacific Ocean. Both resembled the larva of the bobtail snipe eel Cyema atrum, but were morphologically distinct from it. The larvae were transparent and laterally compressed with long snouts, large eyes, fewer than five intestinal loops, and a pattern of lateral pigmentation. The identity of the adult form of these larvae was unknown at the time. After the description of Neocyema erythrosoma in 1978, it was hypothesized that L. holti might be its larval form. However, the larvae had lateral pigmentation not found in the adult N. erythrosoma and had been found over 5,000 kilometres (3,100 mi) away from its only known location in the South Atlantic.

In 1996, Smith and Miller reconsidered this matter in the light of 47 other specimens of L. holti available to them, mostly from the North Atlantic. They determined that there were three species groups among the larvae and that many of the specimens lacked pigmentation. With the discovery of N. erythrosoma in the Northern Atlantic the distance barrier was also overcome and they considered that there was little doubt that L. holti was the larval form of N. erythrosoma.
