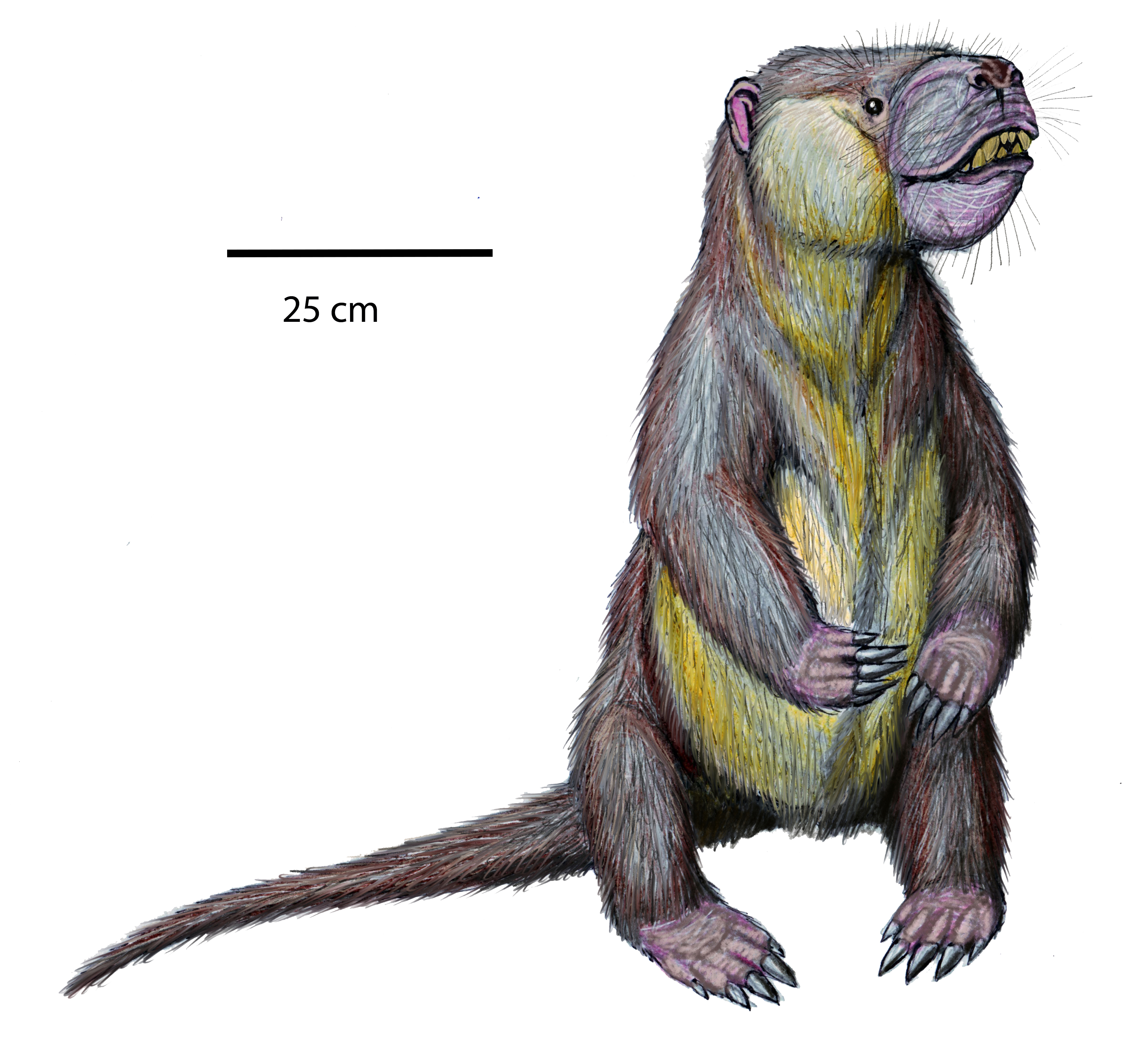
- life restoration of Psittacotherium multifragum
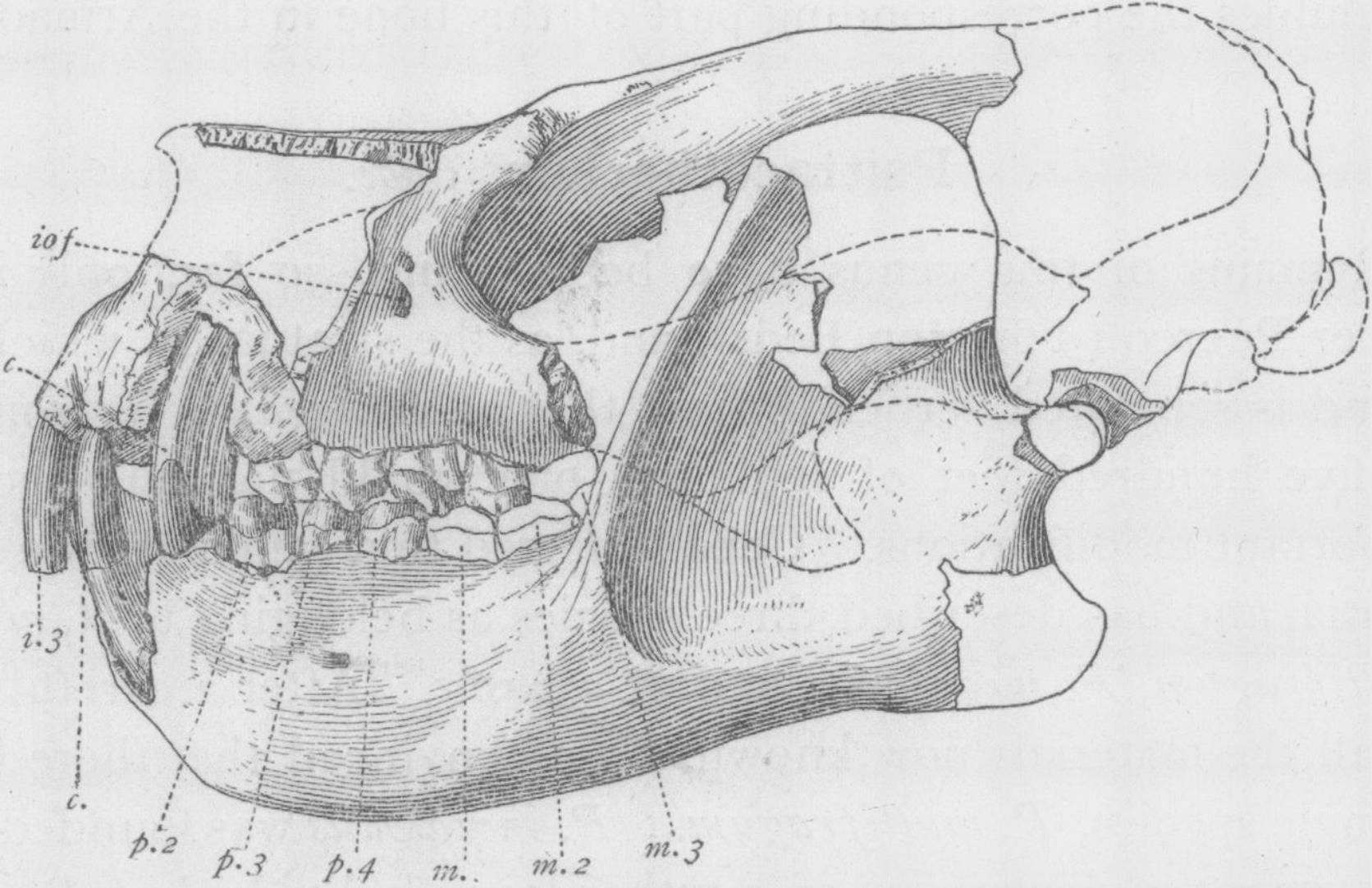
- skull of Psittacotherium multifragum

Scientific classification
- Kingdom: Animalia
- Phylum: Chordata
- Class: Mammalia
- Infraclass: Placentalia (?)
- Order: †Taeniodonta
- Family: †Stylinodontidae
- Subfamily: †Stylinodontinae
- Tribe: †Psittacotheriini; Schoch, 1982
- Genus: †Psittacotherium; Cope, 1882

Type species
- †Psittacotherium multifragum Cope, 1882

Synonyms
- synonyms of genus: Hemiganus (Cope, 1882); synonyms of species: P. multifragum: Hemiganus vultuosus (Cope, 1882); Psittacotherium aspasiae (Cope, 1882); Psittacotherium megalodus (Cope, 1887)

= Psittacotherium =

Psittacotherium Temporal range: 62.4–56.2 Ma early to late paleocene

Genus of extinct placental mammals

Psittacotherium ("parrot beast") is an extinct genus of taeniodonts from extinct tribe Psittacotheriini within subfamily Stylinodontinae and family Stylinodontidae, that lived in North America from early to late Paleocene. With a weight between 35.6 kg (78 lb) and 71.2 kg (157 lb), and length of 1.125 m (3 ft 8.3 in), it had similar size of a large dog.

== Phylogeny ==
- Placentalia
  - Atlantogenata
  - Boreoeutheria
  - †Palaeoryctida
  - - †Ambilestes
    - - †Procerberidae
      - - †Alveugena
        - †Taeniodonta
          - †Schowalteria
          - - - †Conoryctidae
              - †Onychodectidae
            - - †Stylinodontoidea
                - †Stylinodontidae
                  - †Wortmaniinae
                  - †Stylinodontinae
                    - - †Ectoganini
                      - †Stylinodontini
                    - - †Psittacotheriini
                        - †Psittacotherium
                          †Psittacotherium multifragum
