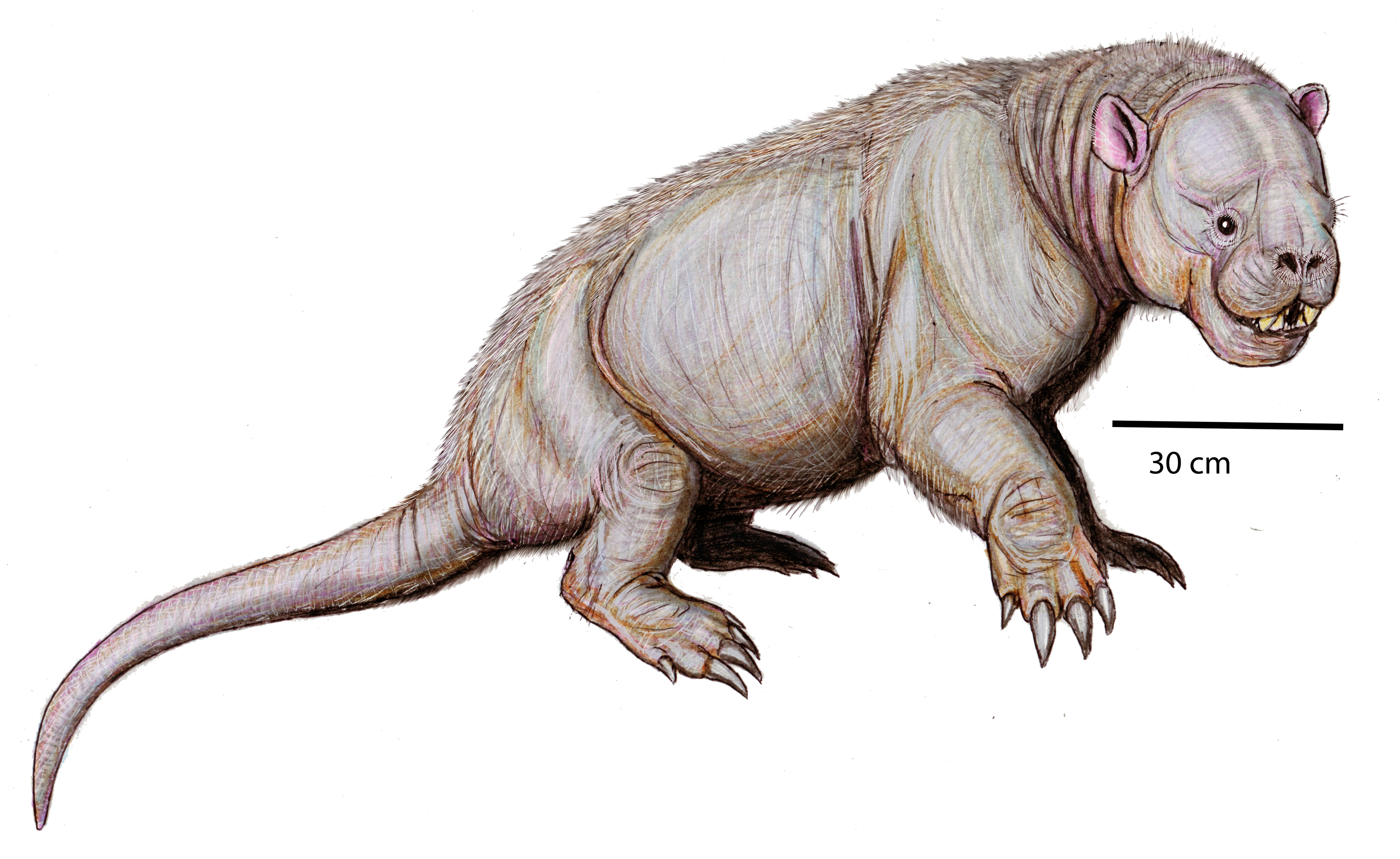
- Life restoration of Stylinodon mirus
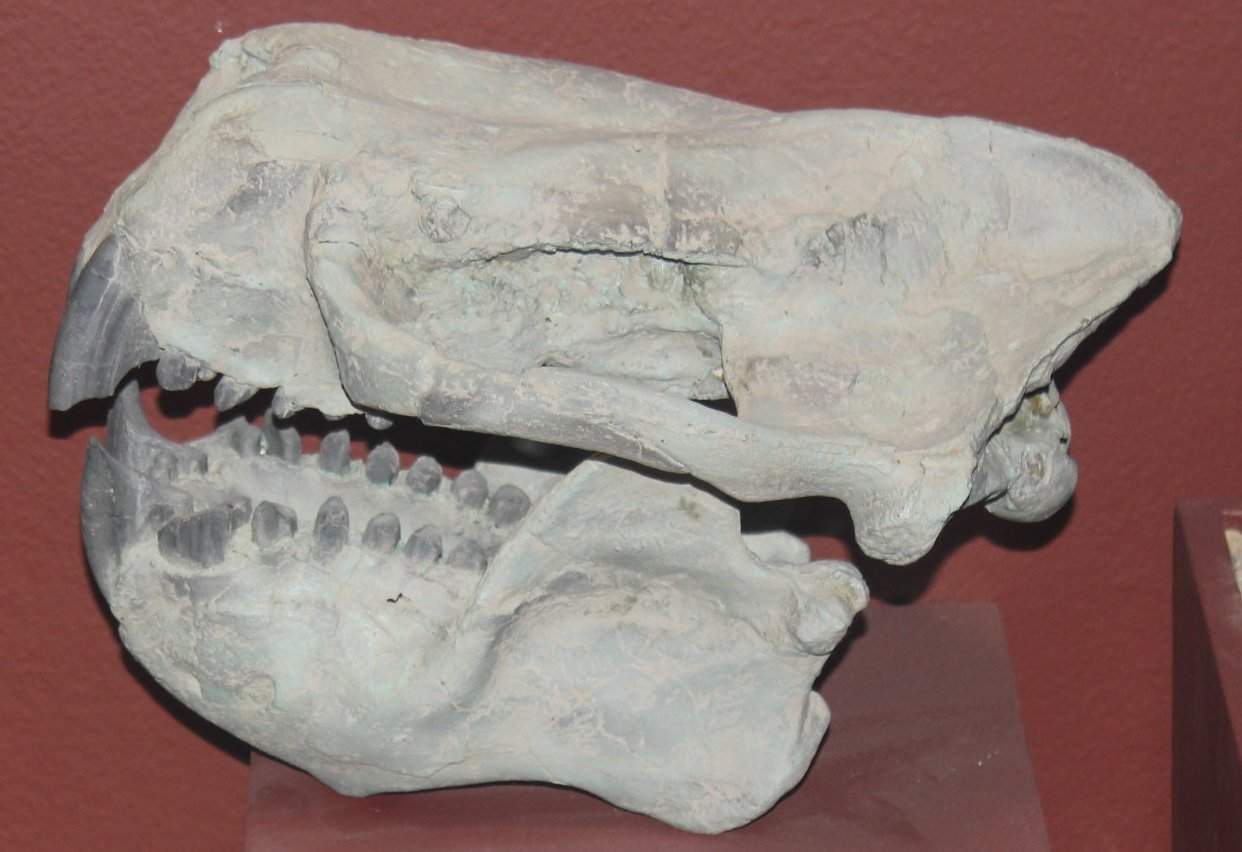
- Skull of Stylinodon mirus

Scientific classification
- Kingdom: Animalia
- Phylum: Chordata
- Class: Mammalia
- Order: †Taeniodonta
- Family: †Stylinodontidae
- Subfamily: †Stylinodontinae
- Tribe: †Stylinodontini; Marsh, 1875
- Genus: †Stylinodon; Marsh, 1874

Type species
- †Stylinodon mirus Marsh, 1874

Synonyms
- synonyms of species: S. mirus: Calamodon cylindrifer (Cope, 1881); Stylinodon cylindrifer (Wortman, 1896); Stylinodon inexplicatus (Schoch & Lucas, 1981)

= Stylinodon =

Stylinodon Temporal range: Eocene, 53.4–39.7 Ma

Genus of extinct mammal

Stylinodon ("tooth with pilar-like fibers") is an extinct genus of taeniodonts that lived in North America from early to middle Eocene.

== Description ==
=== Crania ===
Similar to modern day rodents, Stylinodon had continuously growing teeth. All 6 molars of Stylinodon are similar in shape, being cylindrical, and they have a thin layer of enamel. The incisor teeth of Stylinodon were large and curved. The rest of the skull is short, with prominent temporal fossae and a generally small brain cavity. The sagittal crest is joined with the occipital plane at the top and the skull lacks a prominent occipital condyle, as well as having no paroccipital processes.The lower jaw of Stylinodon is massive and deep, with fused symphysial sutures and large condyles being especially notable features. The ramus is similarly robust. The dental formula of the genus is 2.1.4.31.1.4.3.

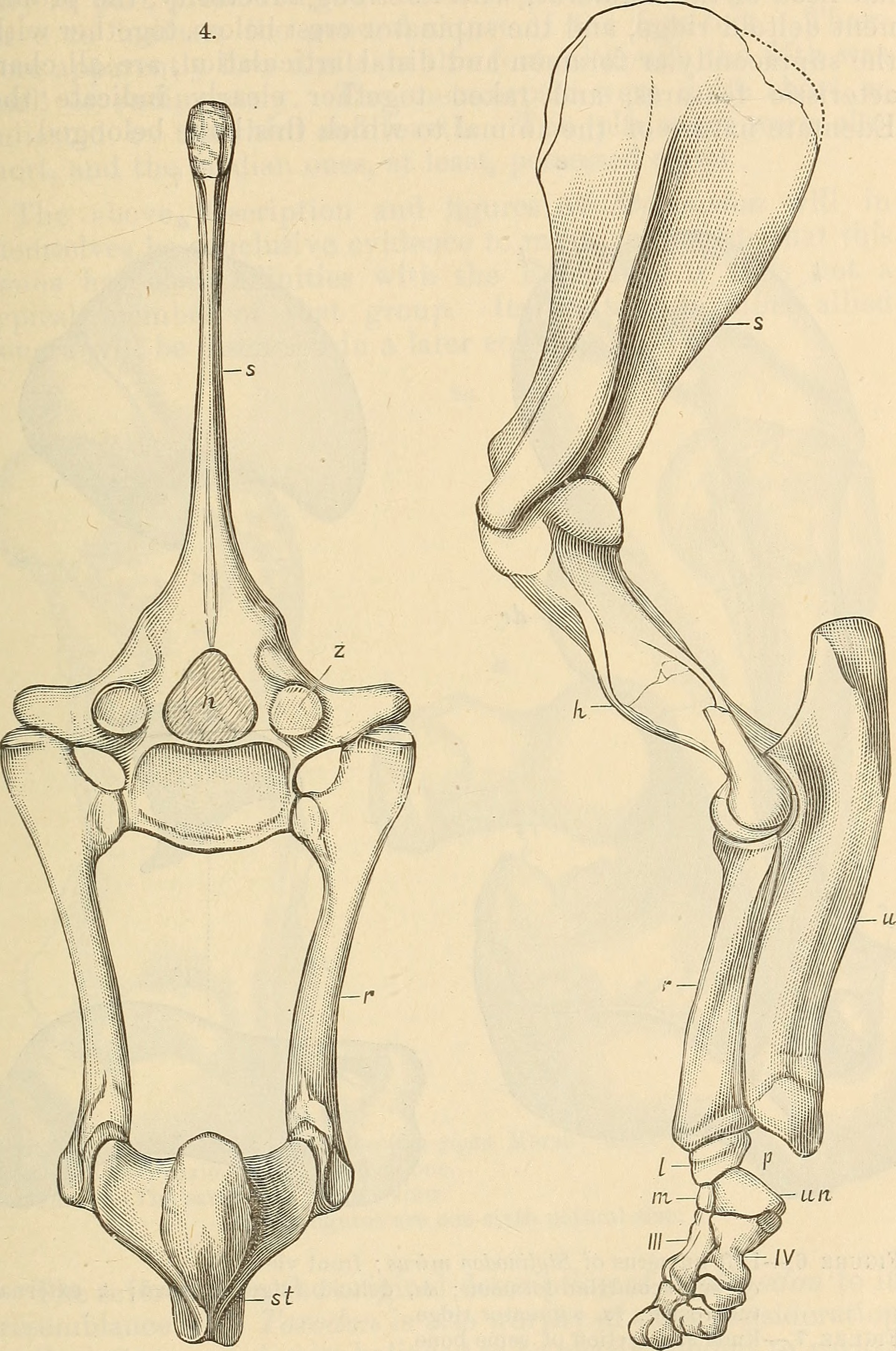
Forelimb and dorsal view of vertebrae of Stylinodon mirus

=== Postcrania ===
Postcranial remains of Stylinodon suggest a degree of fossoriality due to the robustness of the skeletal elements. The morphology of the forelimbs too is adapted for digging, with specific adaptations including a long ulnar olecranon which provides a mechanical advantage for digging motions, an expansion of the terminal phalanges, and the presence of numerous palmar sesamoids. Stylinodon had a narrow, but robust, scapula, as well as a well developed, stout clavicle. The limb morphology of the genus has been compared to those of modern day xenarthrans, with the radius being much smaller than the robust ulna. Stylinodon likely lacked a first digit, and it is speculated that the median phalanges bore claws. It is suspected that the sacrum of Stylinodon consisted of 3 vertebrae.

== History of research ==
Originally described by American Paleontologist Othniel Charles Marsh, Stylinodon was assumed to be related to the Xenarthra by Marsh, and was also considered related the notoungulate Toxodon. Marsh also considered the chalicotheres to be relatives of Stylinodon. Stylinodonts in general were a confusing group due to the rarity of postcranial specimens. A few near complete specimens of Stylinodon are known, including one, PM 3895, which was found layered on top of the skeleton of a juvenile Uintatherium.

== Classification ==
Stylinodon belongs to the extinct tribe Stylinodontini within subfamily Stylinodontinae and family Stylinodontidae. It was historically suggested that all stylinodontine genera were an orthogenetic sequence, with Ectoganus being directly ancestral to Stylinodon, but differences in the dental formula of Ectoganus and Stylinodon have caused this idea to fall out of favor. Currently, Stylinodon is grouped closest with Ectoganus and Psittacotherium.

- Placentalia
  - Atlantogenata
  - Boreoeutheria
  - †Palaeoryctida
  - - †Ambilestes
    - - †Procerberidae
      - - †Alveugena
        - †Taeniodonta
          - †Schowalteria
          - - - †Conoryctidae
              - †Onychodectidae
            - - †Stylinodontoidea
                - †Stylinodontidae
                  - †Wortmaniinae
                  - †Stylinodontinae
                    - †Psittacotheriini
                    - - †Ectoganini
                      - †Stylinodontini
                        - †Stylinodon
                          †Stylinodon mirus

== Paleoecology ==
Stylinodon is known from many Bridgerian and Wasatchian formations, including the Bridger formation, the Wasatch formation, the Huerfano formation and the Wind River formation. These environments were typically fluvial, with some such as the Wasatch formation indicating the presence of swamps. Stylinodon lived alongside a numerous amount of animals, including the dinocerates Uintatherium and Eobasileus, the brontothere Dolichorhinus and crocodilians. In terms of lifestyle, Stylinodon was a fossorially adapted herbivore that likely fed on tubers and other roots.
