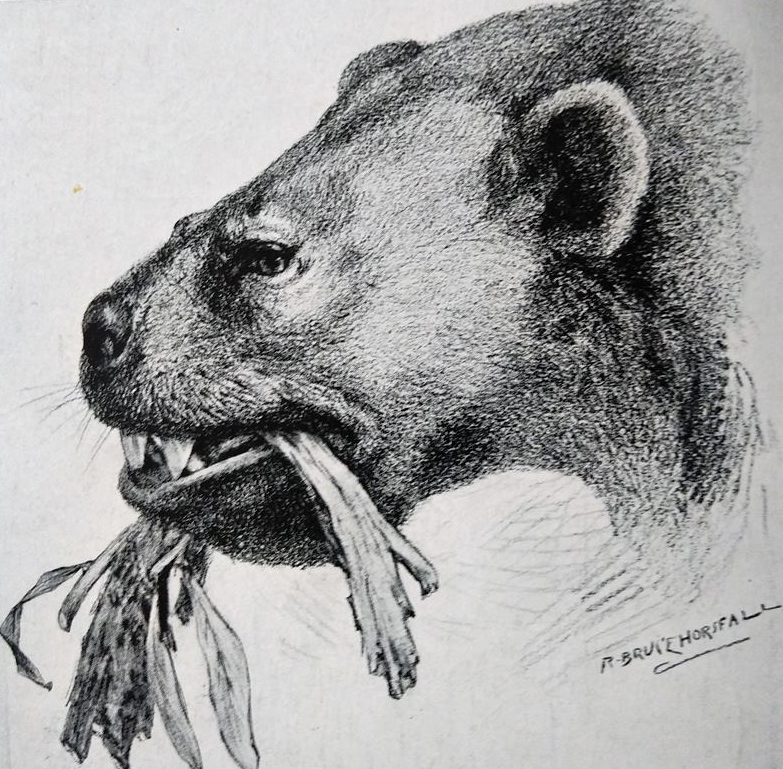
- head of Ectoganus gliriformis (Robert Bruce Horsfall, 1913)

Scientific classification
- Kingdom: Animalia
- Phylum: Chordata
- Class: Mammalia
- Order: †Taeniodonta
- Family: †Stylinodontidae
- Subfamily: †Stylinodontinae
- Tribe: †Ectoganini; Cope, 1876
- Genus: †Ectoganus; Cope, 1874

Type species
- †Ectoganus gliriformis Cope, 1874

Species
- †E. bighornensis (Schoch, 1981); †E. copei (Schoch, 1981); †E. gliriformis (Cope, 1874); †E. lobdelli (Simpson, 1929)

Synonyms
- synonyms of genus: Calamodon (Cope, 1874); Conicodon (Cope, 1894); Dryptodon (Marsh, 1876); Lampadophorus (Patterson, 1949); synonyms of species: E. bighornensis: Ectoganus copei bighornensis (Schoch, 1981); E. copei: Ectoganus copei copei (Schoch, 1981); E. gliriformis: Calamodon arcamaenus (Cope, 1874); Calamodon arcamnaeus (Wortman, 1897); Calamodon arcamoenus (Cope, 1874); Calamodon novomehicanus (Cope, 1874); Calamodon simplex (Cope, 1874); Conicodon simplex (Cope, 1894); Dryptodon crassus (Marsh, 1876); Ectoganus gliriformis gliriformis (Schoch, 1981); Ectoganus novomehicanus (Cope, 1877); Ectoganus simplex (Guthrie, 1967); E. lobdelli: Ectoganus gliriformis lobdelli (Schoch, 1981); Lampadophorus expectatus (Patterson, 1949); Lampadophorus lobdelli (Patterson, 1949); Psittacotherium lobdelli (Simpson, 1929)

= Ectoganus =

Ectoganus Temporal range: 57.8–50.5 Ma late Paleocene to early Eocene

Extinct genus of taeniodonts

Ectoganus ("outside brightness") is an extinct genus of taeniodonts from tribe Ectoganini within subfamily Stylinodontinae and family Stylinodontidae, that lived in North America from the Late Paleocene to Early Eocene.

== Description ==
The microscopic structure of Ectoganus tooth enamel consists of a single main layer. The internal enamel feature known as the Hunter-Schreger band is present but is weakly developed. The enamel is composed of tightly packed rod-like structures (prisms) that show a keyhole-shaped cross-section and only a partially formed outer sheath. The underlying dentine — the main structural tissue of the tooth — follows a typical mammalian pattern. A relatively thick layer of cementum, the tissue that helps anchor teeth in the jaw, covers both the front and back surfaces of the teeth.

== Phylogeny ==
- Placentalia
  - Atlantogenata
  - Boreoeutheria
  - †Palaeoryctida
  - - †Ambilestes
    - - †Procerberidae
      - - †Alveugena
        - †Taeniodonta
          - †Schowalteria
          - - - †Conoryctidae
              - †Onychodectidae
            - - †Stylinodontoidea
                - †Stylinodontidae
                  - †Wortmaniinae
                  - †Stylinodontinae
                    - †Psittacotheriini
                    - - †Stylinodontini
                      - †Ectoganini
                        - †Ectoganus
                          - - †Ectoganus bighornensis
                            - †Ectoganus copei
                          - - †Ectoganus gliriformis
                            - †Ectoganus lobdelli
