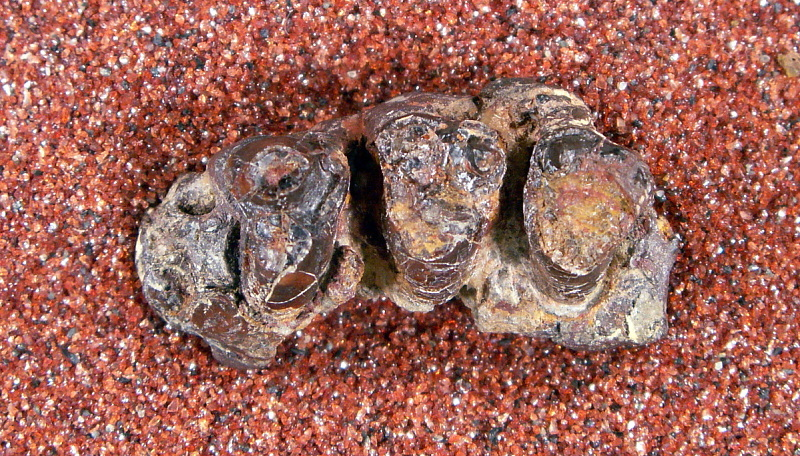
- lower jaw fragment of Conoryctella dragonensis

Scientific classification
- Kingdom: Animalia
- Phylum: Chordata
- Class: Mammalia
- Infraclass: Placentalia (?)
- Order: †Taeniodonta
- Family: †Conoryctidae
- Subfamily: †Conoryctinae
- Tribe: †Conoryctellini; Schoch, 1982
- Genus: †Conoryctella; Gazin, 1939

Type species
- †Conoryctella dragonensis Gazin, 1939

Species
- †C. dragonensis (Gazin, 1939); †C. pattersoni (Schoch & Lucas, 1981)

= Conoryctella =

Conoryctella Temporal range: 63.8–61.4 Ma Early Paleocene

Genus of extinct mammal from the Paleocene

Conoryctella ("cone digger of earth") is an extinct genus of taeniodonts from extinct tribe Conoryctellini within extinct subfamily Conoryctinae and extinct family Conoryctidae, that lived in North America during the early Paleocene.

== History ==
C.L. Gazin named the genus and the type species, Conoryctella dragonensis, in 1939, based on a portion of the left maxilla (upper jawbone) and teeth collected in 1938.

Until 1981, the species was known only from the 1939 holotype described by Gazin.

A second species, C. pattersoni, was described by Robert M. Schoch and Spencer Lucas in 1982. The species was described based on material from the Nacimiento Formation, in New Mexico's San Juan Basin, and named after Bryan Patterson.

== Type locality ==
The type locality is Dragon Canyon, found in the North Horn Formation, Utah.

== Phylogeny ==
- Placentalia
  - Atlantogenata
  - Boreoeutheria
  - †Palaeoryctida
  - - †Ambilestes
    - - †Procerberidae
      - - †Alveugena
        - †Taeniodonta
          - †Schowalteria
          - - †Stylinodontoidea
            - - †Onychodectidae
              - †Conoryctidae
                - †Eurodontinae
                - †Conoryctinae
                  - †Conoryctini
                  - †Conoryctellini
                    - †Conoryctella
                      - †Conoryctella dragonensis
                      - †Conoryctella pattersoni
