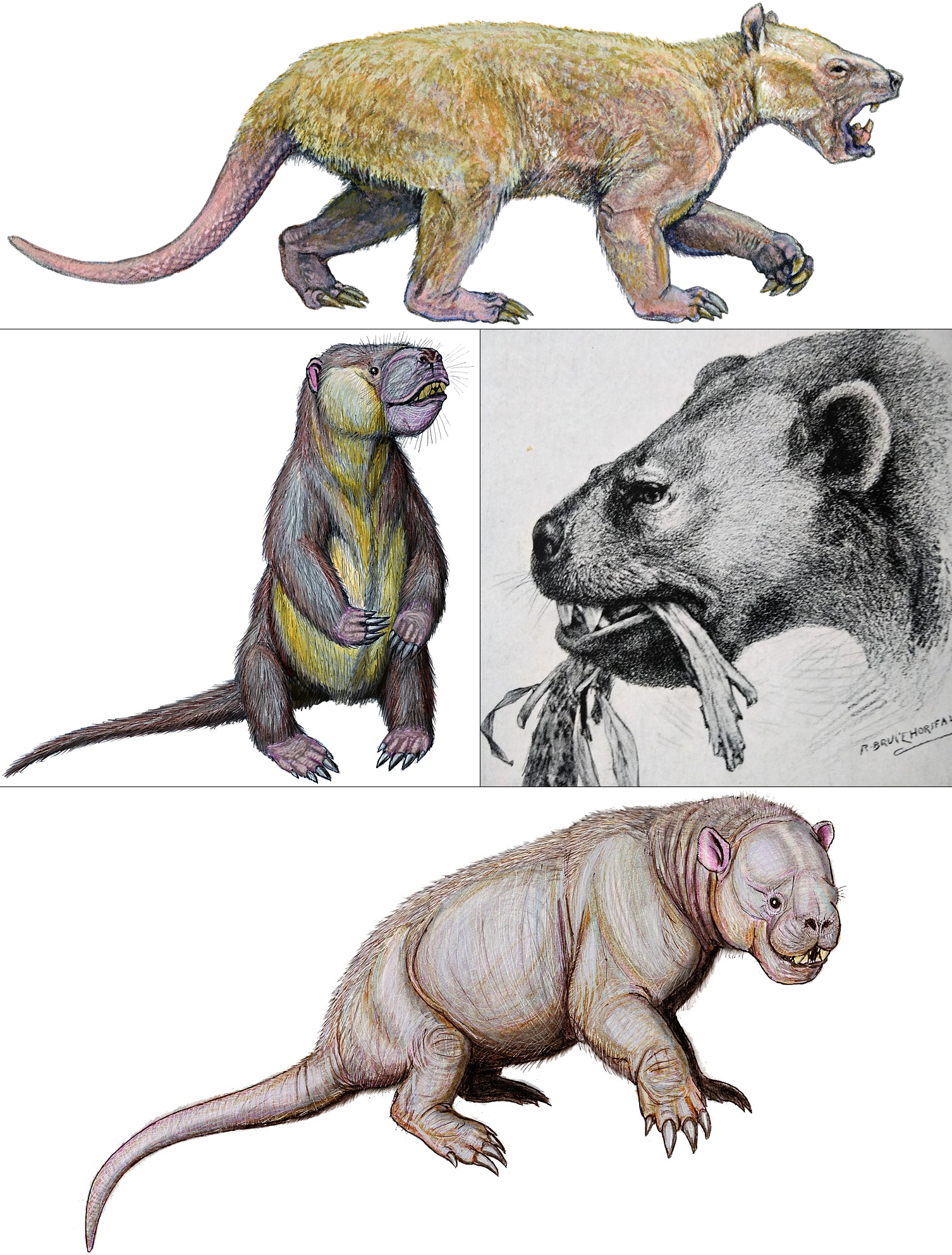
- Species from family Stylinodontidae
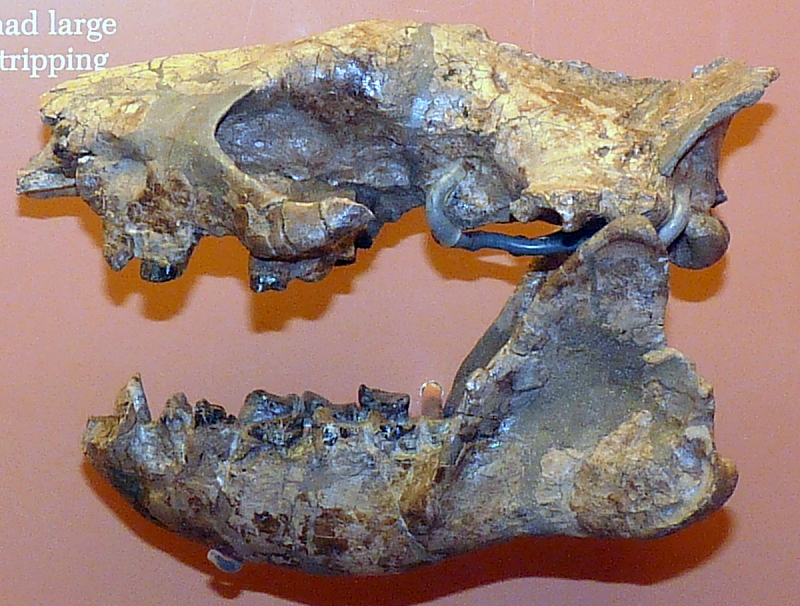
- Skull of Conoryctes comma

Scientific classification
- Kingdom: Animalia
- Phylum: Chordata
- Class: Mammalia
- Clade: Eutheria
- Infraclass: Placentalia (?)
- Order: †Taeniodonta; Cope, 1876

Families
- [see classification]

Synonyms
- list of synonyms: Calamodontia (Haeckel, 1895); Ganodonta (Wortman, 1896); Stylinodontia (Haeckel, 1895); Stylinodontidae (Marsh, 1875); Taeniodontidae (Szalay, 1977)

= Taeniodonta =

Taeniodonta Temporal range: 70.0–39.7 Ma Late Cretaceous - Middle Eocene

Extinct order of mammals

Taeniodonta ("banded teeth") is an extinct order of eutherian mammals, that lived in North America and Europe from the late Cretaceous (Maastrichtian) to the middle Eocene. They were among the first mammals to evolve large body sizes (comparable to a modern wild boar or American black bear), as well as ever-growing teeth for eating tough plants.

At least nine genera of taeniodonts are classified into two families. Conorycitids are a paraphyletic family of small-to-medium-sized animals (5-15kg) with generalized forms. Their cheek teeth developed hypsodont crowns, which show they were plant-eaters. Their fossils disappear before the Eocene. Stylinodonts are a true (monophyletic) family of medium-to-large (10-110kg) animals that quickly evolved larger bodies, with huge compressed, recurved claws on the middle toes of the forefoot, and adaptations in the forelimb for digging. Later genera, like Stylinodon, had ever-growing teeth.

== Description ==
Like many early mammals, taeniodonts had generalized, heavy bodies and tails and walked on the soles of their feet. However, the heads of stylodonts are unique. The face was unusually short, with massive jaws and attachments on the skull for powerful chewing muscles. Stylinodonts developed curved, ever-growing front teeth with enamel only on the outside surface. Because enamel is harder than the rest of the tooth, the tooth wears at an angle, creating a battery of self-sharpening chisels at the front of the mouth. The gnawing teeth of modern rodents work in this way, but stylinodonts developed these teeth independently, using the canines rather than the incisors. The rear teeth became ever-growing pegs, with enamel restricted to bands on the sides of the tooth. Ever-growing (root hypsodont) molars in mammals are usually associated with diets of hard vegetable food. However, enamel loss creates a softer tooth. Stylinodont molars could crush but not grind food, and high pressure chewing did not happen at the back of the mouth, as it does in modern mammals with hard diets such as horses, squirrels, and elephants. Their teeth could not have sliced meat, and the forearm adaptations show strong digging and rooting habits. Over time, stylinodonts grew larger, with more of their body mass in the forelegs and head, and more of their chewing power in the front teeth.

Analysis of a preserved braincase of Onychodectes tisonensis shows the cerebrum was flat without convolutions, pointing to limited intelligence, as is true for most early mammals. However, they had some of the largest olfactory bulbs (in proportion to brain size) of any mammal that has ever lived. This finding suggests taeniodonts relied mostly on their sense of smell.

Advanced stylinodonts persisted long after the extinction of the conoryctids, though they were never common animals in their environments. They may have been among the first specialist mammals to move into upland areas, seeking specific hard-coated plants and fruits in the hothouse environments unique to the Paleocene and Eocene. However, their disappearance from the fossil record coincides with the appearance of the first pig-like artiodactyls. Stylinodonts may have been the first mammals to use ecological niches later taken over by suids and vegetarian bears, and been unable to compete with faster-moving, more intelligent, grind-chewing mammals that were also specialized for smelling out, rooting, and digging for a wide range of food.

According to 2022 studies of Bertrand, O. C. and Sarah L. Shelley, taeniodonts are identified to be a basal placental mammal, not closely related to any living family. Genera Alveugena, Ambilestes and Procerberus were considered the immediate outgroups to Taeniodonta, with genus Alveugena classified as a sister taxon to this order.

== Taxonomy and phylogeny ==
=== Taxonomy ===
From Thomas E. Williamson and Stephen L. Brusatte (2013):

- Order: †Taeniodonta (Cope, 1876)
  - Genus: †Schowalteria (Fox & Naylor, 2003)
    - †Schowalteria clemensi (Fox & Naylor, 2003)
  - Family: †Conoryctidae (Wortman, 1896)
    - Subfamily: †Conoryctinae (Wortman, 1896)
      - Tribe: †Conoryctellini (Schoch, 1982)
        - Genus: †Conoryctella (Gazin, 1939)
          - †Conoryctella dragonensis (Gazin, 1939)
          - †Conoryctella pattersoni (Schoch & Lucas, 1981)
      - Tribe: †Conoryctini (Wortman, 1896)
        - Genus: †Conoryctes (Cope, 1881)
          - †Conoryctes comma (Cope, 1881)
        - Genus: †Huerfanodon^{(paraphyletic genus)} (Schoch & Lucas, 1981)
          - †Huerfanodon heilprinianus (Cope, 1882)
          - †Huerfanodon polecatensis (Schoch & Lucas, 1981)
          - †Huerfanodon torrejonius (Schoch & Lucas, 1981)
          - †Huerfanodon sp. [USNM 9678] (Simpson, 1937)
    - Subfamily: †Eurodontinae (Estavis & Russel, 1992)
      - Genus: †Eurodon (Estavis & Russel, 1992)
        - †Eurodon silveirinhensis (Estavis & Russel, 1992)
  - Family: †Onychodectidae (Winge, 1917)
    - Genus: †Onychodectes (Cope, 1888)
      - †Onychodectes tisonensis (Cope, 1888)
        - †Onychodectes tisonensis rarus (Osborn & Earle, 1895)
        - †Onychodectes tisonensis tisonensis (Cope, 1888)
  - Superfamily: †Stylinodontoidea (Marsh, 1875)
    - Family: †Stylinodontidae (Marsh, 1875)
      - Subfamily: †Stylinodontinae (Marsh, 1875)
        - Tribe: †Ectoganini (Cope, 1876)
          - Genus: †Ectoganus (Cope, 1874)
            - †Ectoganus bighornensis (Schoch, 1981)
            - †Ectoganus copei (Schoch, 1981)
            - †Ectoganus gliriformis (Cope, 1874)
            - †Ectoganus lobdelli (Simpson, 1929)
        - Tribe: †Psittacotheriini (Schoch, 1982)
          - Genus: †Psittacotherium (Cope, 1882)
            - †Psittacotherium multifragum (Cope, 1882)
        - Tribe: †Stylinodontini (Marsh, 1875)
          - Genus: †Stylinodon (Marsh, 1874)
            - †Stylinodon mirus (Marsh, 1874)
      - Subfamily: †Wortmaniinae (Schoch, 1982)
        - Genus: †Wortmania (Hay, 1899)
          - †Wortmania otariidens (Cope 1885)
          - †Wortmania sp. [Garfield County, Montana] (Clemens, 2013)

=== Phylogeny ===
- Placentalia
  - Atlantogenata
  - Boreoeutheria
  - †Palaeoryctida
  - - †Ambilestes
    - - †Procerberinae
      - - †Alveugena
        - †Taeniodonta
          - - †Schowalteria
              †Schowalteria clemensi
          - - - †Conoryctidae
                - †Conoryctinae
                  - †Conoryctini
                    - - †Conoryctes
                        †Conoryctes comma
                      - †Huerfanodon polecatensis
                    - †Huerfanodon heilprinianus
                    - †Huerfanodon torrejonius
                    - ?
                      †Huerfanodon sp. (USNM 9678)
                  - †Conoryctellini
                    - †Conoryctella
                      - †Conoryctella dragonensis
                      - †Conoryctella pattersoni
                - †Eurodontinae
                  - †Eurodon
                    †Eurodon silveirinhensis
              - †Onychodectidae
                - †Onychodectes
                  - †Onychodectes tisonensis
                    - †Onychodectes tisonensis rarus
                    - †Onychodectes tisonensis tisonensis
            - - †Stylinodontoidea
                - †Stylinodontidae
                  - †Wortmaniinae
                    - †Wortmania
                      - †Wortmania otariidens
                      - ?
                        †Wortmania sp. (Garfield County, Montana)
                  - †Stylinodontinae
                    - - †Psittacotheriini
                        - †Psittacotherium
                          †Psittacotherium multifragum
                    - - †Stylinodontini
                        - †Stylinodon
                          †Stylinodon mirus
                      - †Ectoganini
                        - †Ectoganus
                          - - †Ectoganus bighornensis
                            - †Ectoganus copei
                          - - †Ectoganus gliriformis
                            - †Ectoganus lobdelli
