= Albian =

Sixth and last age of the Early Cretaceous

- 113.2 ± 0.3 – 100.5 ± 0.1 Ma
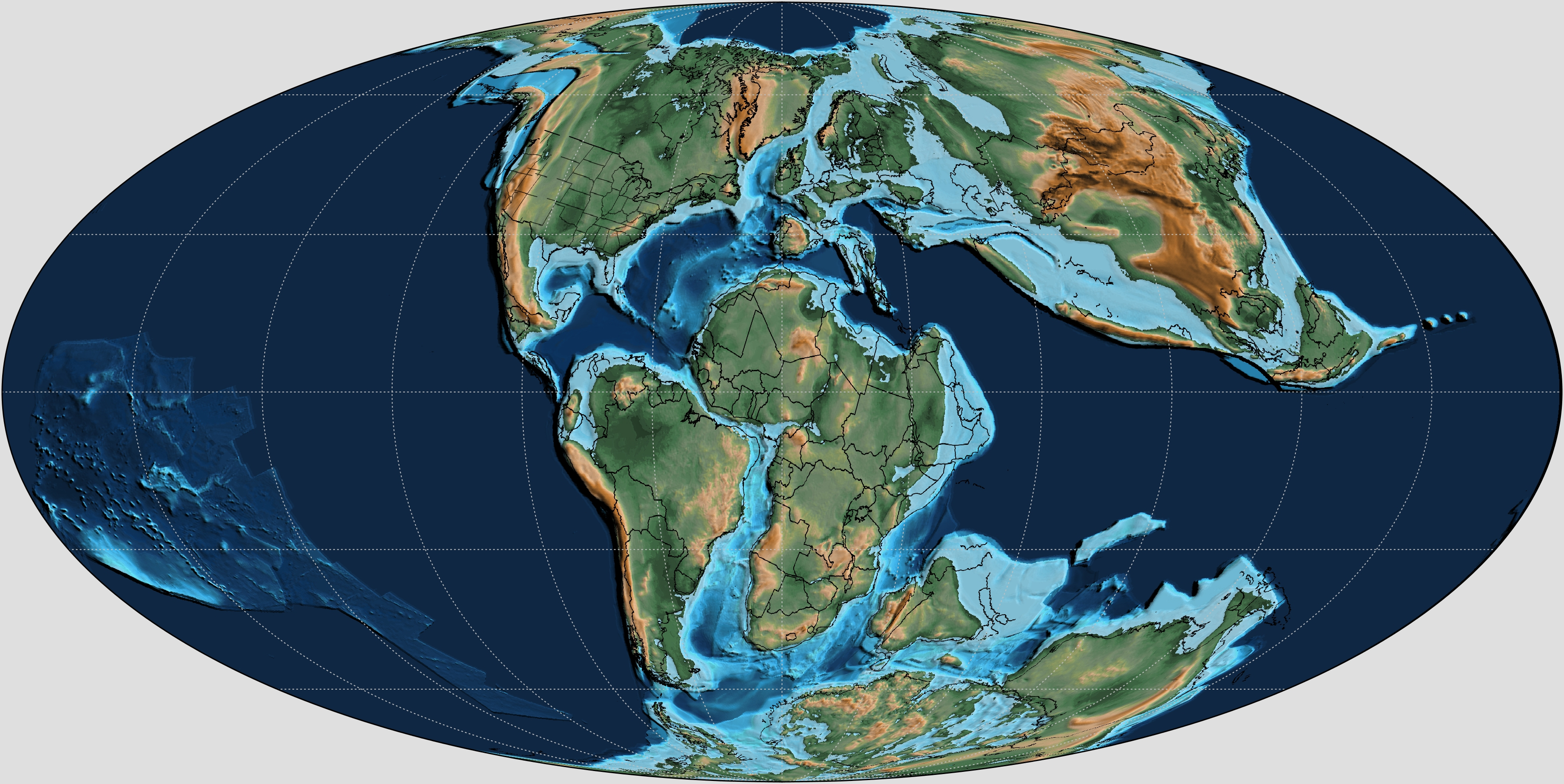
- Mollweide map of Earth 110 million years ago, with black outlines depicting countries in their locations

Chronology
← / K-Pg mass extinction
Subdivision of the Cretaceous according to the ICS, as of 2024. Vertical axis scale: Millions of years ago

Etymology
- Name formality: Formal

Usage information
- Celestial body: Earth
- Regional usage: Global (ICS)
- Time scale(s) used: ICS Time Scale

Definition
- Chronological unit: Age
- Stratigraphic unit: Stage
- Time span formality: Formal
- Lower boundary definition: FAD of the Planktonic Foraminifer Microhedbergella renilaevis
- Lower boundary GSSP: Col de Pré-Guittard section, Arnayon, Drôme, France; 44.507900°N 5.297300°E
- Lower GSSP ratified: April 2016
- Upper boundary definition: FAD of the Planktonic Foraminifer Rotalipora globotruncanoides
- Upper boundary GSSP: Mont Risoux, Hautes-Alpes, France; 44.3925°N 5.5119°E
- Upper GSSP ratified: 2002

The Albian is both an age of the geologic timescale and a stage in the stratigraphic column. It is the youngest or uppermost subdivision of the Early/Lower Cretaceous Epoch/Series. Its approximate time range is 113.2 ± 0.3 Ma to 100.5 ± 0.1 Ma (million years ago). The Albian is preceded by the Aptian and followed by the Cenomanian.

== Stratigraphic definitions ==
The Albian Stage was first proposed in 1842 by Alcide d'Orbigny. It was named after Alba, the Latin name for River Aube in France.

A Global Boundary Stratotype Section and Point (GSSP), ratified by the IUGS in 2016, defines the base of the Albian as the first occurrence of the planktonic foraminiferan Microhedbergella renilaevis at the Col de Pré-Guittard section, Arnayon, Drôme, France.

The top of the Albian Stage (the base of the Cenomanian Stage and Upper Cretaceous Series) is defined as the place where the foram species Rotalipora globotruncanoides first appears in the stratigraphic column.

The Albian is sometimes subdivided in Early/Lower, Middle and Late/Upper subages or substages. In western Europe, especially in the United Kingdom, a subdivision in two substages (Vraconian and Gaultian) is more commonly used.

== Examples ==
Examples of Albian sedimentary rock are: the phosphorite beds of the Argonne and Bray areas in France; the Flammenmergel of northern Germany; the lignites of Utrillas in Spain; the Upper Nubian Sandstones, and the Fredericksburg beds of North America.

== Climate ==
Over the course of the Albian, the area in what is now the Liupanshan Basin, China became progressively hotter and drier.
