= Late Cretaceous =

Subdivision of Cretaceous Period

Late/Upper Cretaceous
- 100.5 ± 0.1 – 66.0 Ma
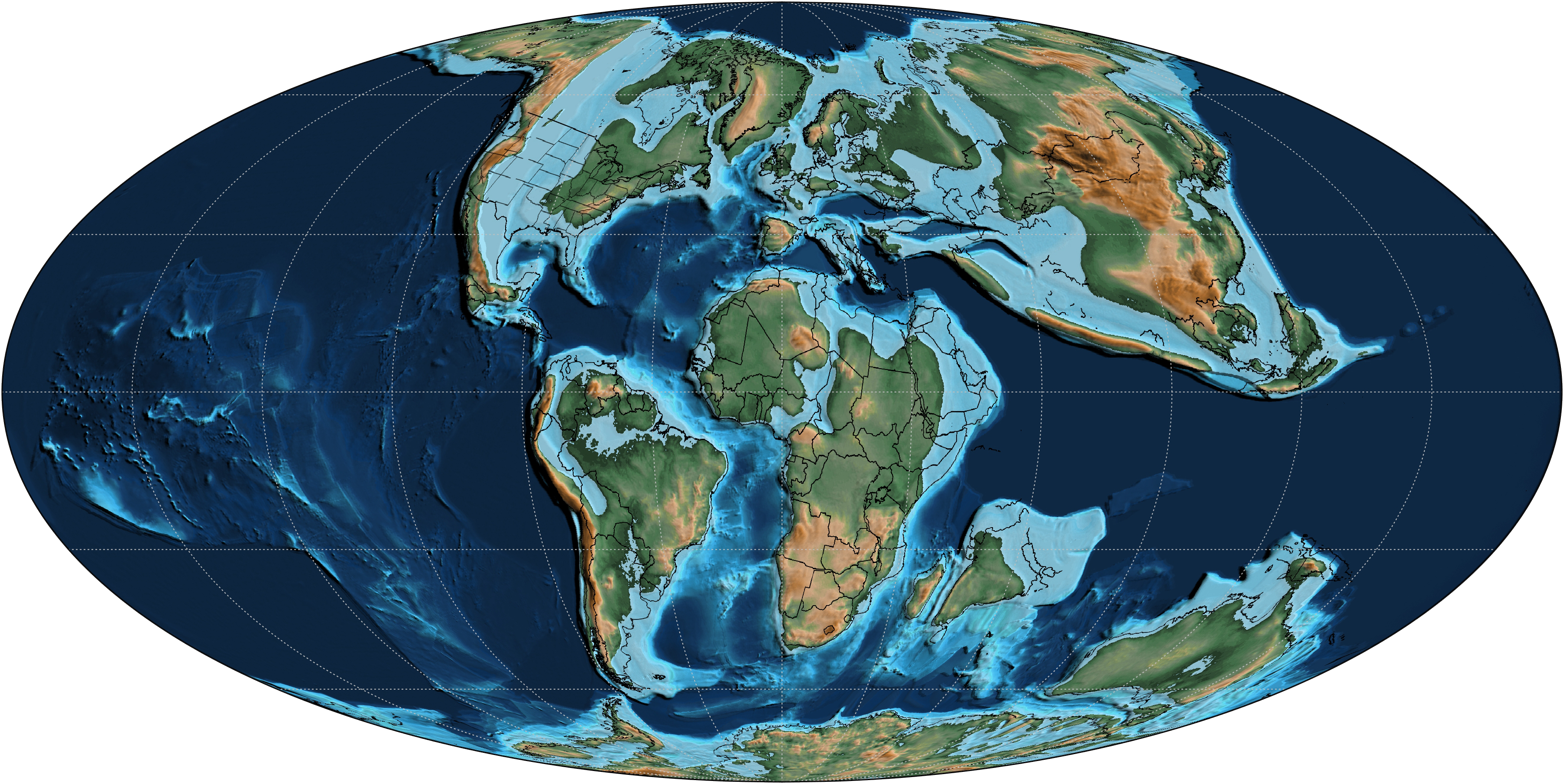
- A map of Earth as it appeared 85 million years ago during the Late Cretaceous Epoch, Santonian Age

Chronology
← / K-Pg mass extinction
Subdivision of the Cretaceous according to the ICS, as of 2024. Vertical axis scale: Millions of years ago

Etymology
- Chronostratigraphic name: Upper Cretaceous
- Geochronological name: Late Cretaceous
- Name formality: Formal

Usage information
- Celestial body: Earth
- Regional usage: Global (ICS)
- Time scale(s) used: ICS Time Scale

Definition
- Chronological unit: Epoch
- Stratigraphic unit: Series
- Time span formality: Formal
- Lower boundary definition: FAD of the Planktonic Foraminifer Rotalipora globotruncanoides
- Lower boundary GSSP: Mont Risoux, Hautes-Alpes, France; 44.3925°N 5.5119°E
- Lower GSSP ratified: 2002
- Upper boundary definition: Iridium enriched layer associated with a major meteorite impact and subsequent K-Pg extinction event
- Upper boundary GSSP: El Kef Section, El Kef, Tunisia; 36.1537°N 8.6486°E
- Upper GSSP ratified: 1991

The Late Cretaceous (100.5–66 Ma) is the more recent of two epochs into which the Cretaceous Period is divided in the geologic time scale. Rock strata from this epoch form the Upper Cretaceous Series. The Cretaceous is named after creta, the Latin word for the white limestone known as chalk. The chalk of northern France and the white cliffs of south-eastern England date from the Cretaceous Period.

== Climate ==
During the Late Cretaceous, the climate was warmer than present, although throughout the period a cooling trend is evident. The tropics became restricted to equatorial regions and northern latitudes experienced markedly more seasonal climatic conditions.

== Geography ==
Due to plate tectonics, the Americas were gradually moving westward, causing the Atlantic Ocean to expand. The Western Interior Seaway divided North America into eastern and western halves; Appalachia and Laramidia. India maintained a northward course towards Asia. In the Southern Hemisphere, Australia and Antarctica seem to have remained connected and began to drift away from Africa and South America. Europe was an island chain. Populating some of these islands were endemic dwarf dinosaur species.

== Vertebrate fauna ==
=== Non-avian dinosaurs ===
In the Late Cretaceous, the hadrosaurs, ankylosaurs, and ceratopsians experienced success in Asiamerica (Western North America and eastern Asia). Tyrannosaurs dominated the large predator niche in North America. They were also present in Asia, although were usually smaller and more primitive than the North American varieties. Pachycephalosaurs were also present in both North America and Asia. Dromaeosaurids shared the same geographical distribution, and are well documented in both Mongolia and Western North America. Additionally therizinosaurs (known previously as segnosaurs) appear to have been in North America and Asia. Gondwana held a very different dinosaurian fauna, with most predators being abelisaurids and carcharodontosaurids; and titanosaurs being among the dominant herbivores. Spinosaurids were also present during this time.

=== Birds (avian dinosaurs) ===
Birds became increasingly common, diversifying in a variety of enantiornithe and ornithurine forms. Early Neornithes such as Vegavis co-existed with forms as bizarre as Yungavolucris and Avisaurus. Though mostly small, marine Hesperornithes became relatively large and flightless, adapted to life in the open sea.

=== Pterosaurs ===
Though primarily represented by azhdarchids, other forms like pteranodontids, tapejarids (Caiuajara and Bakonydraco), nyctosaurids and uncertain forms (Piksi, Navajodactylus) are also present. Historically, it has been assumed that pterosaurs were in decline due to competition with birds, but it appears that neither group overlapped significantly ecologically, nor is it particularly evident that a true systematic decline was ever in place, especially with the discovery of smaller pterosaur species.

=== Mammals ===
Several old mammal groups began to disappear, with the last eutriconodonts occurring in the Campanian of North America. In the northern hemisphere, cimolodont, multituberculates, metatherians and eutherians were the dominant mammals, with the former two groups being the most common mammals in North America. In the southern hemisphere there was instead a more complex fauna of dryolestoids, gondwanatheres and other multituberculates and basal eutherians; monotremes were presumably present, as was the last of the haramiyidans, Avashishta.

Mammals, though generally small, ranged into a variety of ecological niches, from carnivores (Deltatheroida), to mollusc-eater (Stagodontidae), to herbivores (multituberculates, Schowalteria, Zhelestidae and Mesungulatidae) to highly atypical cursorial forms (Zalambdalestidae, Brandoniidae).

True placentals evolved only at the very end of the epoch; the same can be said for true marsupials. Instead, nearly all known eutherian and metatherian fossils belong to other groups.

=== Marine life ===
In the seas, mosasaurs suddenly appeared and underwent a spectacular evolutionary radiation. Modern sharks also appeared and penguin-like polycotylid plesiosaurs (3 meters long) and huge long-necked elasmosaurs (13 meters long) also diversified. These predators fed on the numerous teleost fishes, which in turn evolved into new advanced and modern forms (Neoteleostei). Ichthyosaurs and pliosaurs, on the other hand, became extinct during the Cenomanian-Turonian anoxic event.

== Flora ==
Near the end of the Cretaceous Period, flowering plants diversified. In temperate regions, familiar plants like magnolias, sassafras and roses could be found in abundance.

== Cretaceous–Paleogene mass extinction discovery ==
The Cretaceous–Paleogene extinction event was a large-scale mass extinction of animal and plant species in a geologically short period of time, approximately 66 million years ago (Ma). It is widely known as the K–T extinction event and is associated with a geological signature, usually a thin band dated to that time and found in various parts of the world, known as the Cretaceous–Paleogene boundary (K–T boundary). K is the traditional abbreviation for the Cretaceous Period derived from the German name Kreidezeit, and T is the abbreviation for the Tertiary Period (a historical term for the period of time now covered by the Paleogene and Neogene periods). The event marks the end of the Mesozoic Era and the beginning of the Cenozoic Era. "Tertiary" being no longer recognized as a formal time or rock unit by the International Commission on Stratigraphy, the K-T event is now called the Cretaceous—Paleogene (or K-Pg) extinction event by many researchers.

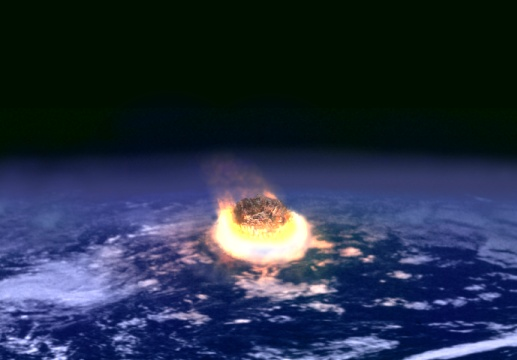
Asteroids of only a few kilometers wide can release the energy of millions of nuclear weapons when colliding with planets (artist's impression).

Non-avian dinosaur fossils are found only below the Cretaceous–Paleogene boundary and became extinct immediately before or during the event. A very small number of dinosaur fossils have been found above the Cretaceous–Paleogene boundary, but they have been explained as reworked fossils, that is, fossils that have been eroded from their original locations and then preserved in later sedimentary layers. Mosasaurs, plesiosaurs, pterosaurs and many species of plants and invertebrates also became extinct. Mammalian and bird clades passed through the boundary with few extinctions, and evolutionary radiation from those Maastrichtian clades occurred well past the boundary. Rates of extinction and radiation varied across different clades of organisms.

Many scientists hypothesize that the Cretaceous–Paleogene extinctions were caused by catastrophic events such as the massive asteroid impact that caused the Chicxulub crater, in combination with increased volcanic activity, such as that recorded in the Deccan Traps, both of which have been firmly dated to the time of the extinction event. In theory, these events reduced sunlight and hindered photosynthesis, leading to a massive disruption in Earth's ecology.

== See also ==
- Flora and fauna of the Maastrichtian stage
- Hațeg Island
