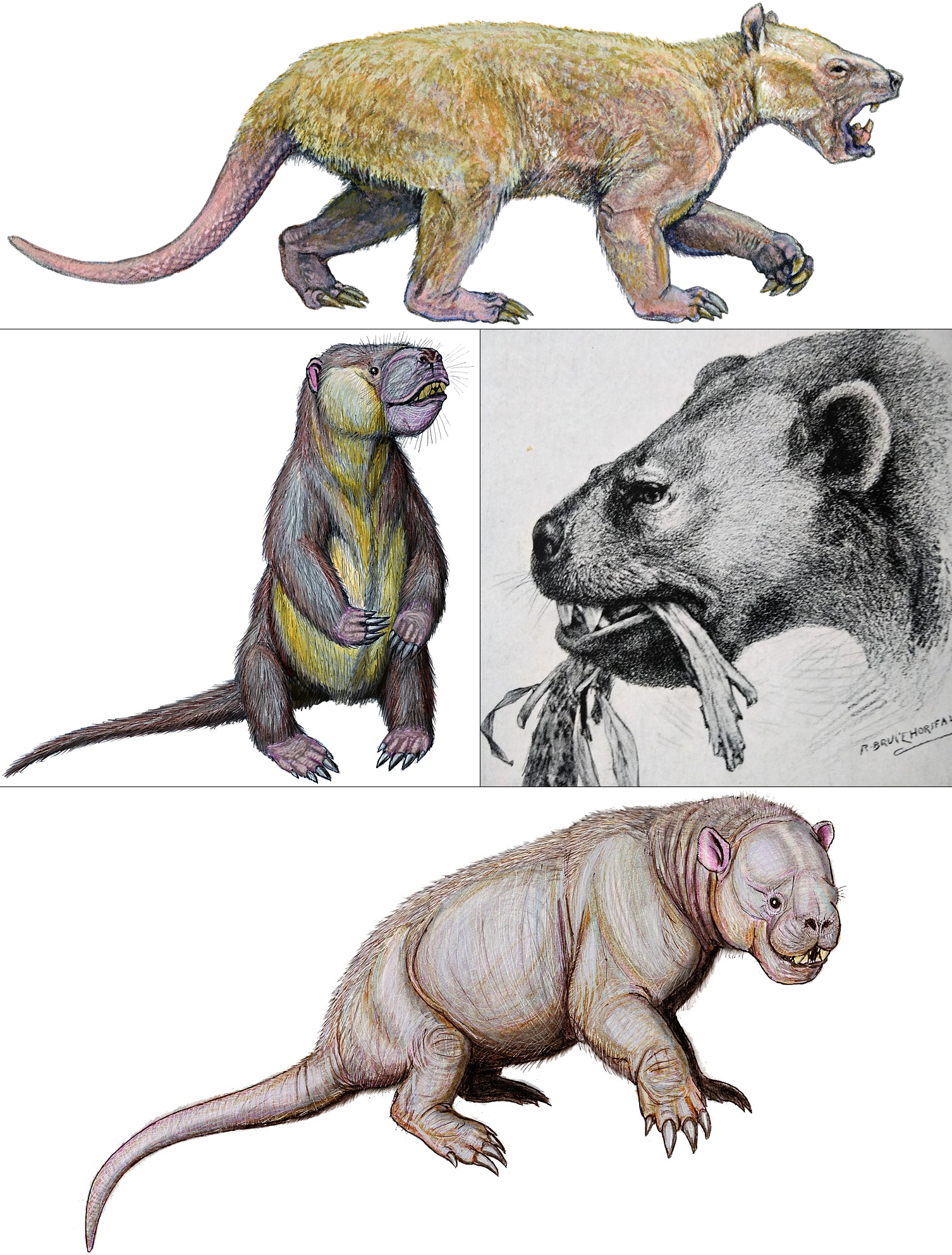
- Species from family Stylinodontidae

Scientific classification
- Kingdom: Animalia
- Phylum: Chordata
- Class: Mammalia
- Clade: Eutheria
- Infraclass: Placentalia (?)
- Order: †Taeniodonta
- Superfamily: †Stylinodontoidea; Marsh, 1875
- Family: †Stylinodontidae; Marsh, 1875

Type genus
- †Stylinodon Marsh, 1874

Subfamilies
- †Stylinodontinae; †Wortmaniinae

Synonyms
- synonyms of family: Calamodontidae (Cope, 1876); Ectoganidae (Cope, 1876); Hemiganidae (Cope, 1888); Stylinodontinae (Schlosser, 1911); Stylinodontini (Winge, 1917)

= Stylinodontidae =

Stylinodontidae Temporal range: 64.7–39.7 Ma Early Paleocene - Middle Eocene

Extinct family of mammals

Stylinodontidae ("teeth with pilar-like fibers") is an extinct family of mammals from extinct superfamily Stylinodontoidea within extinct order Taeniodonta, that lived in North America from the early Paleocene to middle Eocene.

== Taxonomy and phylogeny ==
=== Taxonomy ===
- Superfamily:†Stylinodontoidea (Marsh, 1875)
  - Family: †Stylinodontidae (Marsh, 1875)
    - Subfamily: †Stylinodontinae (Marsh, 1875)
      - Tribe: †Ectoganini (Cope, 1876)
        - Genus: †Ectoganus (Cope, 1874)
          - †Ectoganus bighornensis (Schoch, 1981)
          - †Ectoganus copei (Schoch, 1981)
          - †Ectoganus gliriformis (Cope, 1874)
          - †Ectoganus lobdelli (Simpson, 1929)
      - Tribe: †Psittacotheriini (Schoch, 1982)
        - Genus: †Psittacotherium (Cope, 1882)
          - †Psittacotherium multifragum (Cope, 1882)
      - Tribe: †Stylinodontini (Marsh, 1875)
        - Genus: †Stylinodon (Marsh, 1874)
          - †Stylinodon mirus (Marsh, 1874)
    - Subfamily: †Wortmaniinae (Schoch, 1982)
      - Genus: †Wortmania (Hay, 1899)
        - †Wortmania otariidens (Cope 1885)
        - †Wortmania sp. [Garfield County, Montana] (Clemens, 2013)

=== Phylogeny ===
- Placentalia
  - Atlantogenata
  - Boreoeutheria
  - †Palaeoryctida
  - - †Ambilestes
    - - †Procerberidae
      - - †Alveugena
        - †Taeniodonta
          - †Schowalteria
          - - - †Conoryctidae
              - †Onychodectidae
            - - †Stylinodontoidea
                - †Stylinodontidae
                  - †Wortmaniinae
                    - †Wortmania
                      - †Wortmania otariidens
                      - ?
                        †Wortmania sp. (Garfield County, Montana)
                  - †Stylinodontinae
                    - - †Psittacotheriini
                        - †Psittacotherium
                          †Psittacotherium multifragum
                    - - †Stylinodontini
                        - †Stylinodon
                          †Stylinodon mirus
                      - †Ectoganini
                        - †Ectoganus
                          - - †Ectoganus bighornensis
                            - †Ectoganus copei
                          - - †Ectoganus gliriformis
                            - †Ectoganus lobdelli
