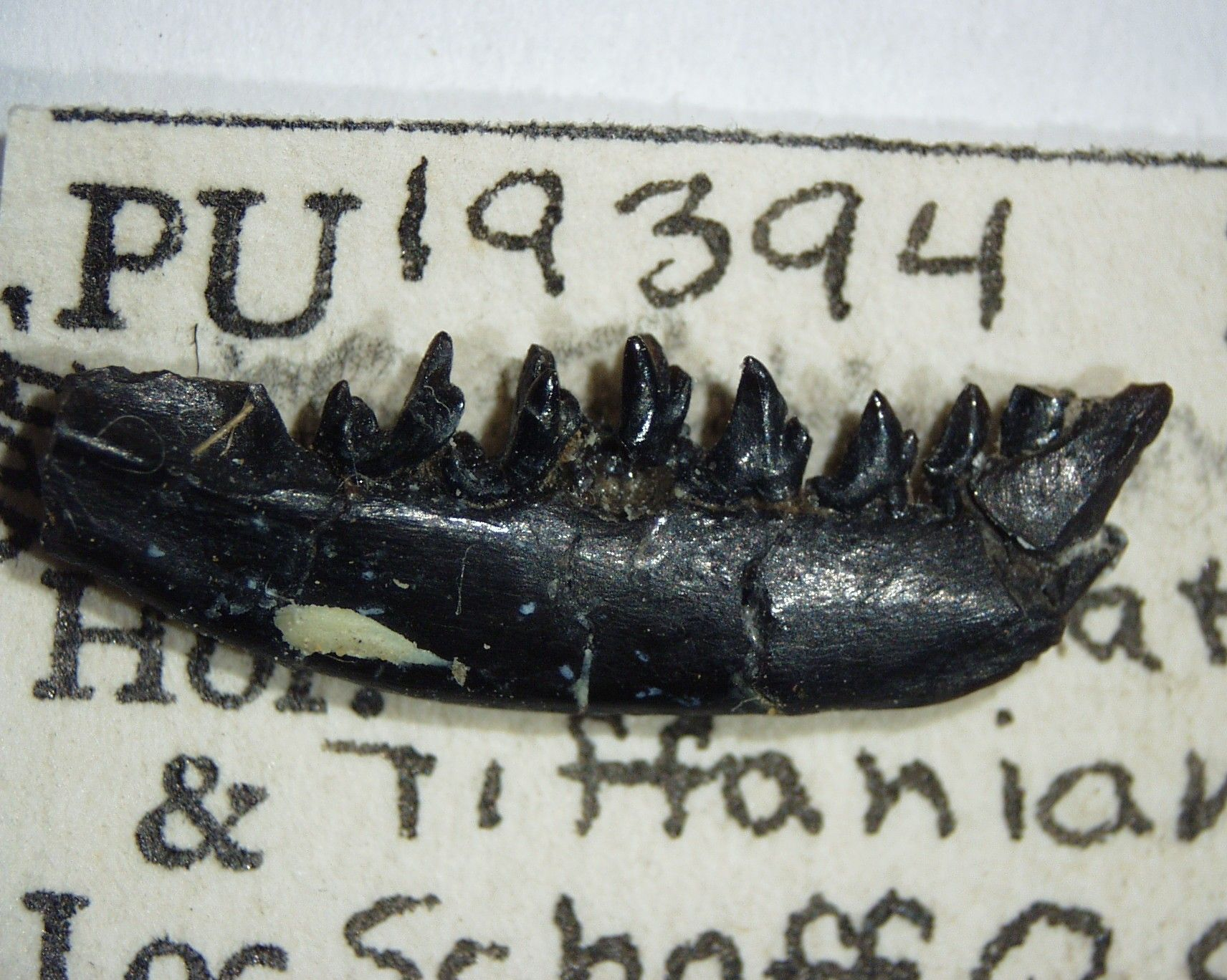
- Palaeoryctes jepseni lower jaw fragment

Scientific classification
- Kingdom: Animalia
- Phylum: Chordata
- Class: Mammalia
- Infraclass: Placentalia (?)
- Order: †Palaeoryctida
- Family: †Palaeoryctidae
- Subfamily: †Palaeoryctinae
- Genus: †Palaeoryctes; Matthew, 1913

Type species
- †Palaeoryctes puercensis Matthew, 1913

Species
- †P. cruoris (Gunnell, 1994); †P. jepseni (Bloch, 2004); †P. puercensis (Matthew, 1913); †P. punctatus (Van Valen, 1966)

= Palaeoryctes =

Palaeoryctes Temporal range: 62.4–53.4 Ma middle Paleocene to early Eocene

Extinct genus of mammals

Palaeoryctes ("ancient digger") is an extinct paraphyletic genus of mammals from paraphyletic subfamily Palaeoryctinae within family Palaeoryctidae, that lived in North America from middle Paleocene to early Eocene.

Palaeoryctes resembled a modern shrew, being slender and sharp-nosed, with typical insectivore teeth. It was around 12.5 centimetres (4.9 in) long, and weighed around 20 to 60 grams (0.71 to 2.12 oz). The molars of Palaeoryctes had little function other than piercing.
