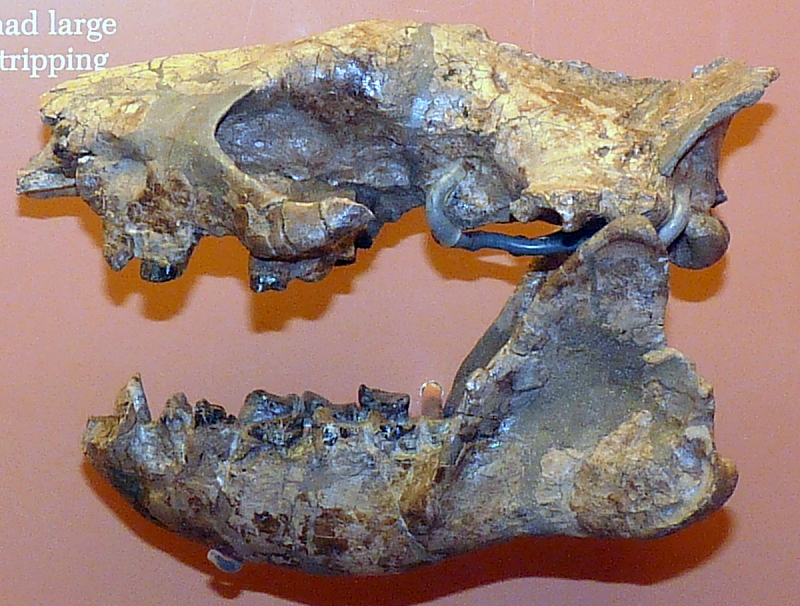
- Skull of Conoryctes comma

Scientific classification
- Kingdom: Animalia
- Phylum: Chordata
- Class: Mammalia
- Order: †Taeniodonta
- Family: †Conoryctidae
- Subfamily: †Conoryctinae
- Tribe: †Conoryctini
- Genus: †Conoryctes; Cope, 1881

Type species
- †Conoryctes comma Cope, 1881

Synonyms
- synonyms of genus: Hexodon (Cope, 1884); synonyms of species: C. comma: Hexodon molestus (Cope, 1884)

= Conoryctes =

Conoryctes Temporal range: 62.4–60.9 Ma Early to Middle Paleocene

Extinct genus of mammals

Conoryctes ("cone digger") is an extinct genus of taeniodonts from extinct tribe Conoryctini within extinct subfamily Conoryctinae and extinct family Conoryctidae, that lived in North America from early to middle Paleocene.

== Palaeobiology ==
Conoryctes comma had well-stabilised digits and powerful forelimbs, indicating that it was highly adapted for scratch-digging.
