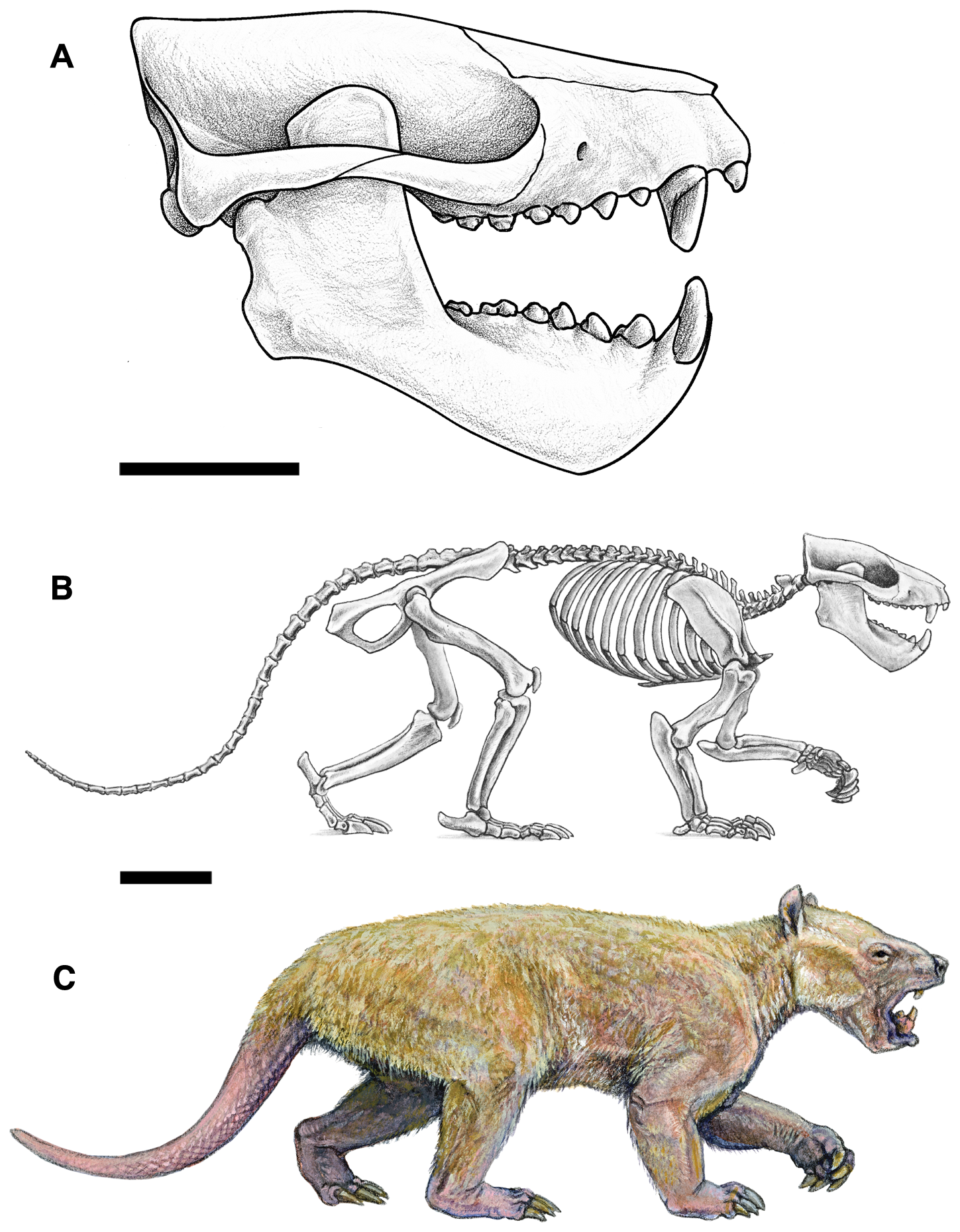
- Wortmania otariidens A - illustration of skull B - illustration of skeleton C - life reconstruction

Scientific classification
- Kingdom: Animalia
- Phylum: Chordata
- Class: Mammalia
- Order: †Taeniodonta
- Family: †Stylinodontidae
- Subfamily: †Wortmaniinae; Schoch, 1982
- Genus: †Wortmania; Hay, 1899

Type species
- †Wortmania otariidens Cope, 1885

Synonyms
- synonyms of genus: Hemiganus (Wortman, 1897); Robertschochia (Lucas, 2011); Schochia (Lucas & Williamson, 1993); synonyms of species: W. otariidens: Hemiganus otariidens (Cope, 1885); Robertschochia sullivani (Lucas, 2011); Schochia sullivani (Lucas & Williamson, 1993)

= Wortmania =

Wortmania Temporal range: 64.7–63.8 Ma Early Paleocene

Genus of extinct mammal from the Paleocene

Wortmania ("Wotman's animal") is an extinct genus of taeniodonts from extinct subfamily Wortmaniinae within extinct family Stylinodontidae, that lived in North America during the early Paleocene.

== Phylogeny ==
- Placentalia
  - Atlantogenata
  - Boreoeutheria
  - †Palaeoryctida
  - - †Ambilestes
    - - †Procerberidae
      - - †Alveugena
        - †Taeniodonta
          - †Schowalteria
          - - - †Conoryctidae
              - †Onychodectidae
            - - †Stylinodontoidea
                - †Stylinodontidae
                  - †Stylinodontinae
                  - †Wortmaniinae
                    - †Wortmania
                      - †Wortmania otariidens
                      - ?
                        †Wortmania sp. (Garfield County, Montana)
