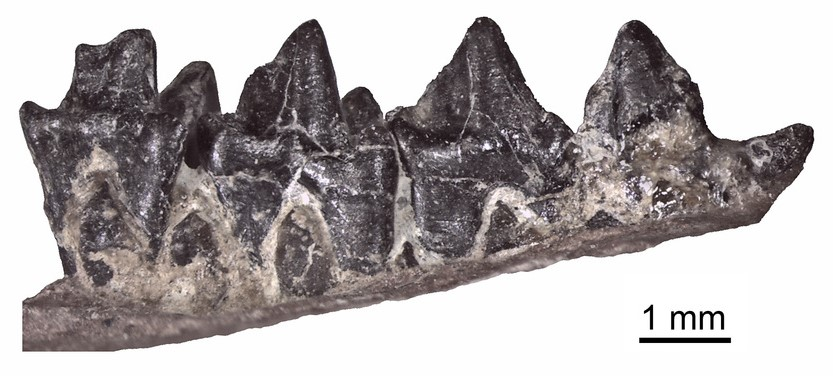
- lower jaw fragment of Aceroryctes dulcis

Scientific classification
- Kingdom: Animalia
- Phylum: Chordata
- Class: Mammalia
- Infraclass: Placentalia (?)
- Order: †Palaeoryctida
- Family: †Palaeoryctidae
- Genus: †Aceroryctes; Rankin & Holroyd, 2014

Type species
- †Aceroryctes dulcis Rankin & Holroyd, 2014

= Aceroryctes =

Aceroryctes Temporal range: 54.4–54.1 Ma early Eocene

Extinct genus of mammals

Aceroryctes ("bitter digger") is an extinct genus of mammals from family Palaeoryctidae, that lived in North America during the early Eocene. Type species Aceroryctes dulcis is known from the Wasatch Formation of Wyoming.
