= Arnayon =

- Commune
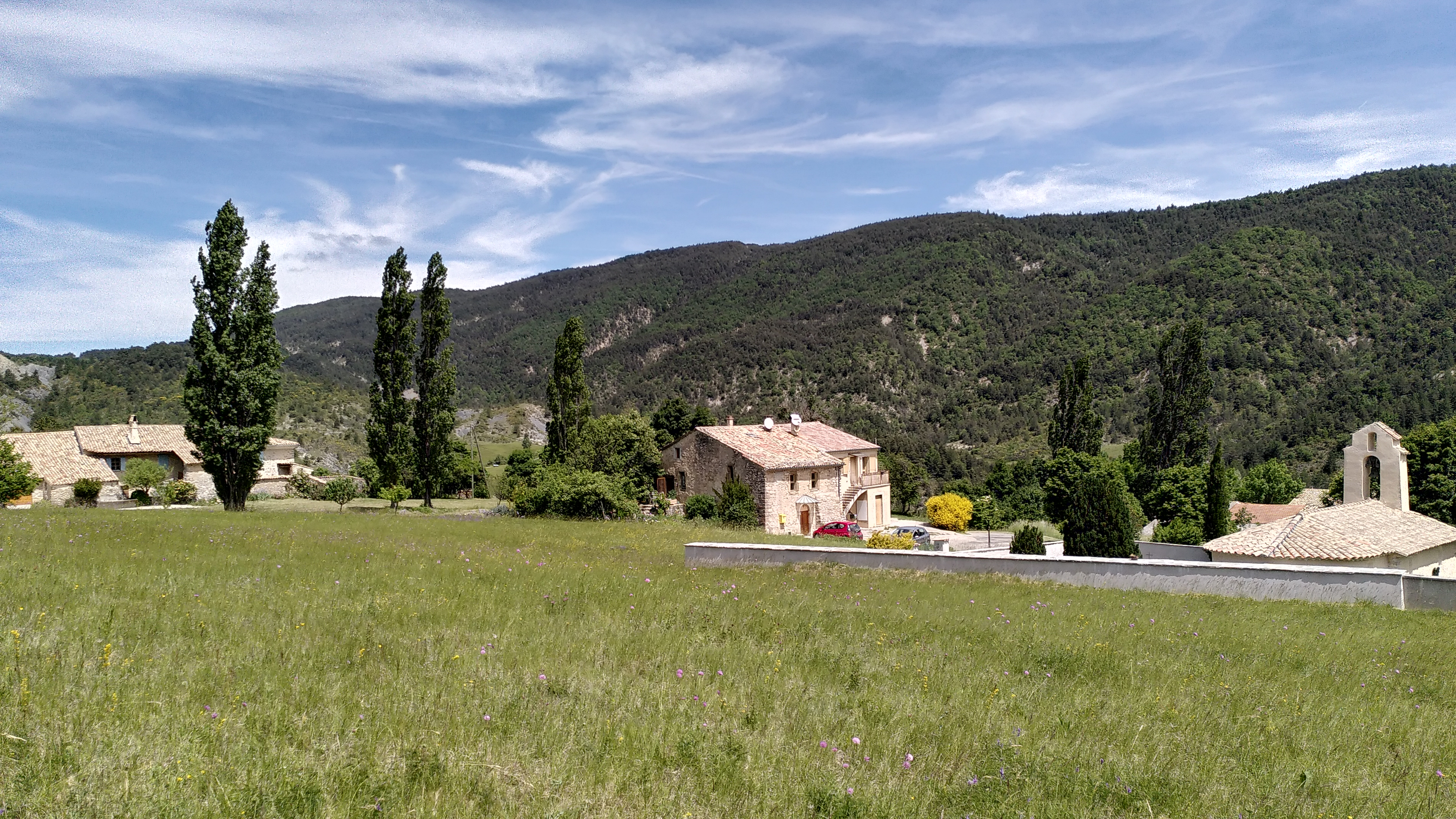
- Location of Arnayon
- Location within France Location within Auvergne-Rhône-Alpes
- Coordinates: 44°29′24″N 5°19′07″E
- Country: France
- Region: Auvergne-Rhône-Alpes
- Department: Drôme
- Arrondissement: Die
- Canton: Le Diois
- Intercommunality: CC Diois

Government
  - Mayor (2020–2026): Michel Bois
- Area^{1}: 19.45 km^{2} (7.51 sq mi)
- Highest elevation: 1,540 m (5,050 ft)
- Lowest elevation: 588 m (1,929 ft)
- Population (2023): 27
  - Density: 1.4/km^{2} (3.6/sq mi)
- Time zone: UTC+01:00 (CET)
  - Summer (DST): UTC+02:00 (CEST)
- INSEE/Postal code: 26012 /26470
- ^{1} French Land Register data, which excludes lakes, ponds, glaciers > 1 km^{2} (0.386 sq mi or 247 acres) and river estuaries.

Arnayon (French pronunciation: [aʁnajɔ̃]; Occitan: Arnaion) is a commune in the Drôme department in southeastern France.

== Population ==
Historical population
| Year | Pop. | ±% p.a. |
|---|---|---|
| 1968 | 53 | — |
| 1975 | 47 | −1.70% |
| 1982 | 28 | −7.13% |
| 1990 | 38 | +3.89% |
| 1999 | 35 | −0.91% |
| 2007 | 33 | −0.73% |
| 2012 | 28 | −3.23% |
| 2017 | 24 | −3.04% |
| 2023 | 27 | +1.98% |
Source: INSEE

== See also ==
- Communes of the Drôme department
