= Mont Risoux =

Mountain in Switzerland

- Le Gros Crêt
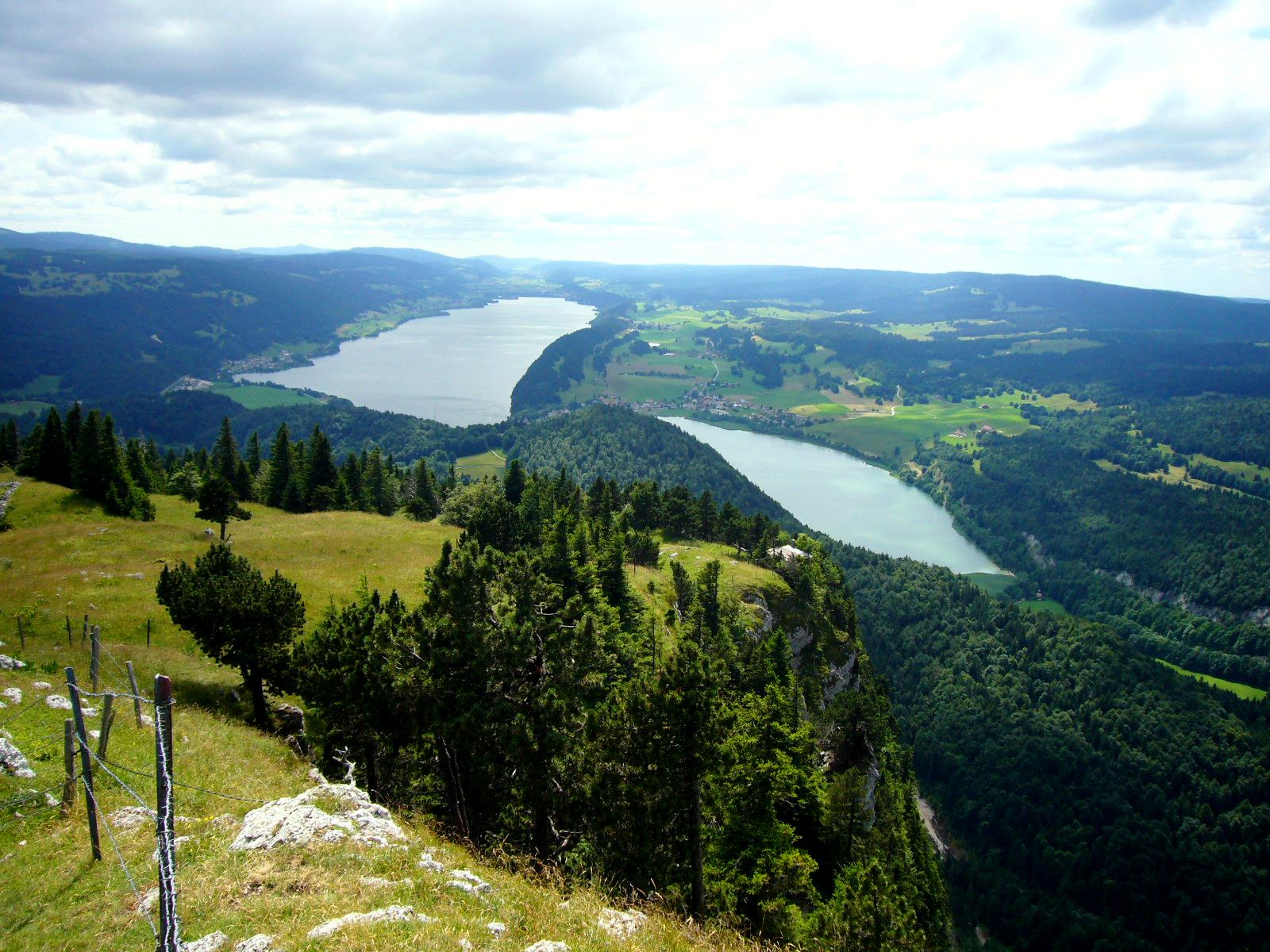
- Mont Risoux (right) from the Vallée de Joux

Highest point
- Elevation: 1,419 m (4,656 ft)
- Prominence: 169 m (554 ft)
- Parent peak: Mont d'Or
- Coordinates: 46°39′39″N 06°14′32″E

Geography
- Location within Switzerland
- Location: Vaud, Switzerland; Doubs, France
- Parent range: Jura Mountains

Mont Risoux (or Grand Risoux) is a large wooded crest of the Jura Mountains, located between France and Switzerland. The culminating point (1,419 m), lying on the border between the department of Doubs and the canton of Vaud, is named Gros Crêt.
