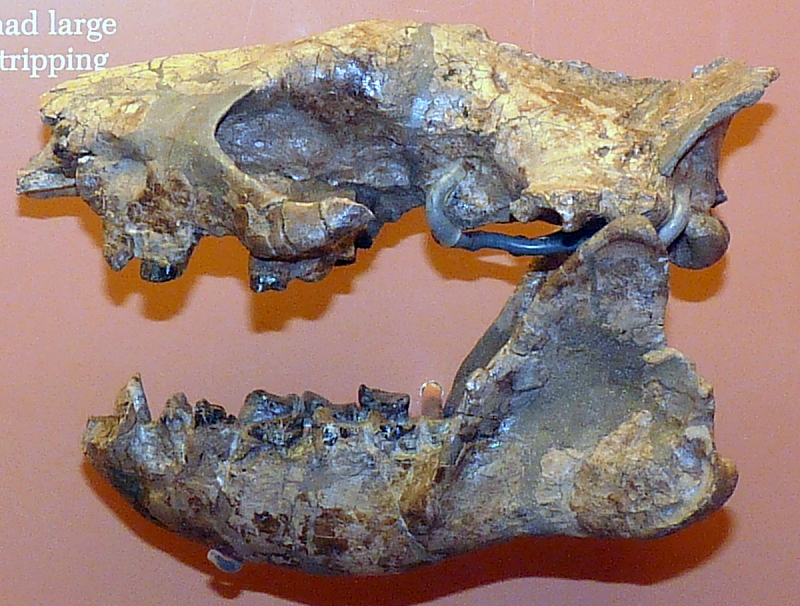
- skull of Conoryctes comma
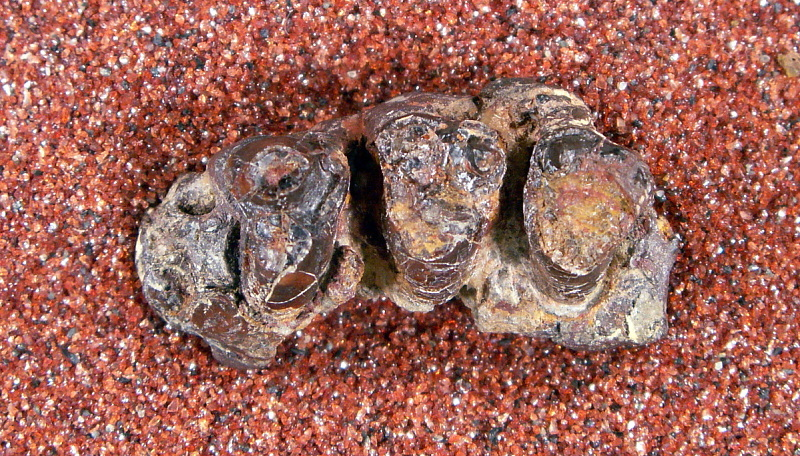
- lower jaw fragment of Conoryctella dragonensis

Scientific classification
- Kingdom: Animalia
- Phylum: Chordata
- Class: Mammalia
- Clade: Eutheria
- Infraclass: Placentalia (?)
- Order: †Taeniodonta
- Family: †Conoryctidae; Wortman, 1896

Type genus
- †Conoryctes Cope, 1881

Subfamilies
- †Conoryctinae; †Eurodontinae

Synonyms
- Conoryctinae (Schlosser, 1911); Conoryctini (Winge, 1917)

= Conoryctidae =

Conoryctidae Temporal range: 63.8–55.2 Ma Early Paleocene - Early Eocene

Extinct family of mammals

Conoryctidae ("cone diggers") is an extinct family of mammals from extinct order Taeniodonta, that lived in North America and Europe from the early Paleocene to early Eocene.

== Taxonomy and phylogeny ==
=== Taxonomy ===
- Family: †Conoryctidae (Wortman, 1896)
  - Subfamily: †Conoryctinae (Wortman, 1896)
    - Tribe: †Conoryctellini (Schoch, 1982)
      - Genus: †Conoryctella (Gazin, 1939)
        - †Conoryctella dragonensis (Gazin, 1939)
        - †Conoryctella pattersoni (Schoch & Lucas, 1981)
    - Tribe: †Conoryctini (Wortman, 1896)
      - Genus: †Conoryctes (Cope, 1881)
        - †Conoryctes comma (Cope, 1881)
      - Genus: †Huerfanodon^{(paraphyletic genus)} (Schoch & Lucas, 1981)
        - †Huerfanodon heilprinianus (Cope, 1882)
        - †Huerfanodon polecatensis (Schoch & Lucas, 1981)
        - †Huerfanodon torrejonius (Schoch & Lucas, 1981)
        - †Huerfanodon sp. [USNM 9678] (Simpson, 1937)
  - Subfamily: †Eurodontinae (Estavis & Russel, 1992)
    - Genus: †Eurodon (Estavis & Russel, 1992)
      - †Eurodon silveirinhensis (Estavis & Russel, 1992)

=== Phylogeny ===
- Placentalia
  - Atlantogenata
  - Boreoeutheria
  - †Palaeoryctida
  - - †Ambilestes
    - - †Procerberidae
      - - †Alveugena
        - †Taeniodonta
          - †Schowalteria
          - - †Stylinodontoidea
            - - †Onychodectidae
              - †Conoryctidae
                - †Eurodontinae
                  - †Eurodon
                    †Eurodon silveirinhensis
                - †Conoryctinae
                  - †Conoryctellini
                    - †Conoryctella
                      - †Conoryctella dragonensis
                      - †Conoryctella pattersoni
                  - †Conoryctini
                    - †Huerfanodon heilprinianus
                    - †Huerfanodon torrejonius
                    - ?
                      †Huerfanodon sp. (USNM 9678)
                    - - †Huerfanodon polecatensis
                      - †Conoryctes
                        †Conoryctes comma
