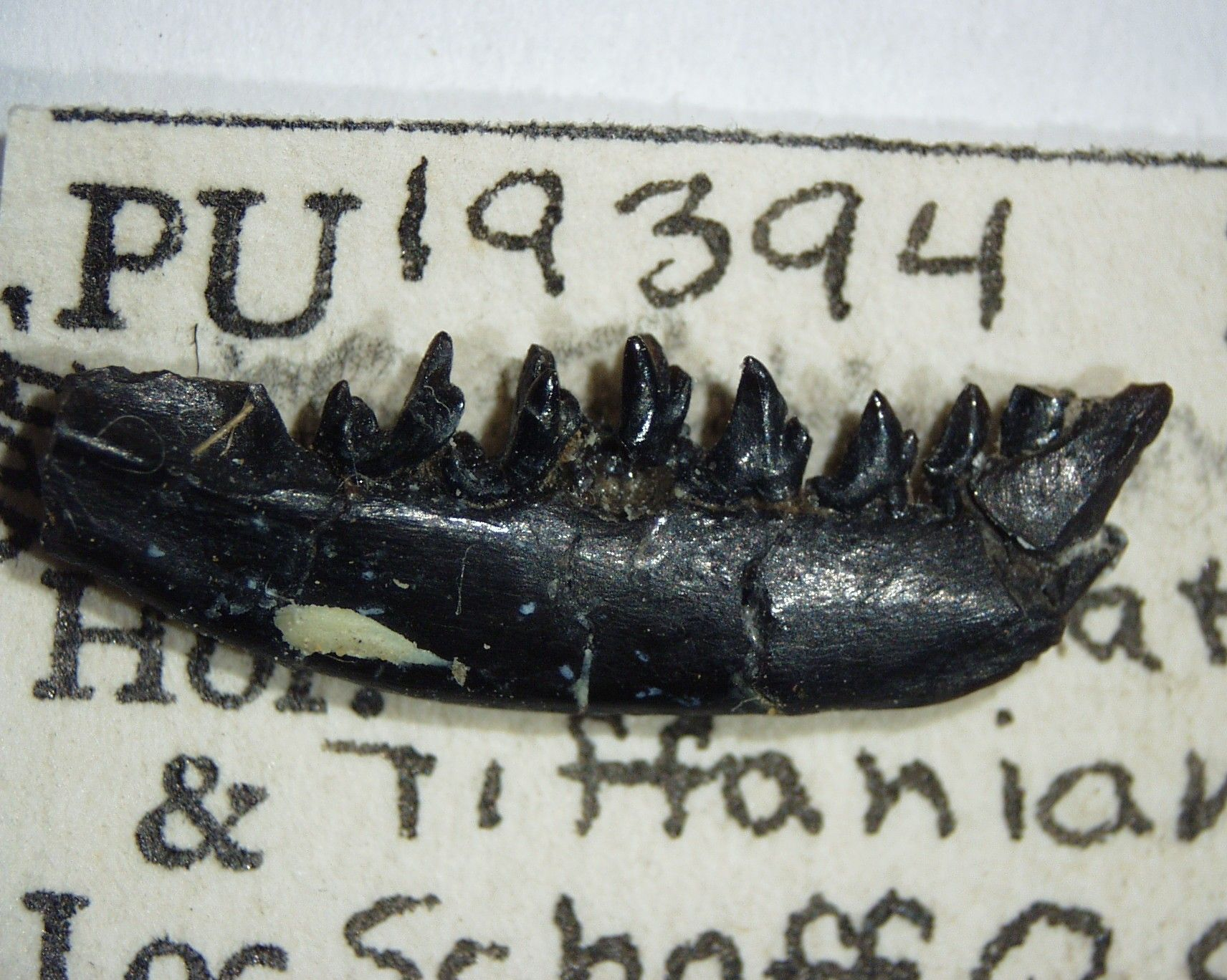
- Palaeoryctes jepseni lower jaw fragment
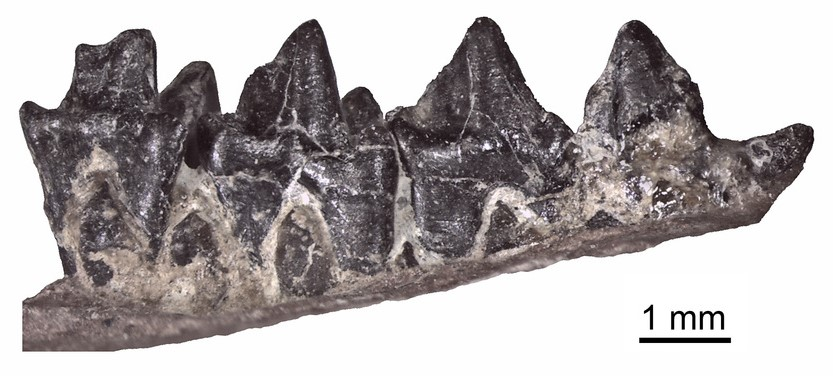
- Aceroryctes dulcis lower jaw fragment

Scientific classification
- Kingdom: Animalia
- Phylum: Chordata
- Class: Mammalia
- Clade: Eutheria
- Infraclass: Placentalia (?)
- Order: †Palaeoryctida; Averianov, 2003
- Family: †Palaeoryctidae; Winge, 1917

Type genus
- †Palaeoryctes Matthew, 1913

Genera
- [see classification]

Synonyms
- synonyms of family: Palaeoryctae (Winge, 1917); Palaeoryctinae (Van Valen, 1966); Palaeoryctoidea (Van Valen, 1966)

= Palaeoryctidae =

Palaeoryctidae Temporal range: 70.0–42.0 Ma Late Cretaceous - Middle Eocene

Extinct family of mammals

Palaeoryctidae ("ancient diggers") is an extinct family of non-specialized eutherian mammals from extinct order Palaeoryctida, that lived in North America, Europe and Asia from the late Cretaceous to the middle Eocene.

== Description ==
From a near-complete skull of the genus Palaeoryctes found in New Mexico, it is known that palaeoryctids were small, shrew-like insectivores with an elongated snout similar to that of the leptictids. However, in contrast to the latter, little is known about palaeoryctids' postcranial anatomy (the skeleton without the skull). A 2024 study found shared cranial details between palaeoryctids and leptictids, suggesting a possible close relationship, plesiomorphic retentions, or convergent acquisitions. Where the leptictids were short-lived, the palaeoryctids seem to have been ancestors of Eocene species. While their dental morphology still indicate a mostly insectivorous diet, it, to some extent, also relate to Eocene carnivores such as creodonts.

== Taxonomy and phylogeny ==
=== History of phylogeny ===
The relationship between this archaic group and other insectivorous mammals is uncertain. Palaeoryctidae was originally assigned to the now-abandoned grouping Insectivora by Sloan and Van Valen (1965), then to clade Proteutheria, and more recently to Eutheria by Scott et al. (2002).

Generally speaking Palaeoryctidae has been used as a wastebasket taxon for many archaic insectivorous mammals.

According to a 2022 study by Bertrand et al., palaeoryctids are identified to be a basal group of placental mammals.

=== Taxonomy ===
- Order: †Palaeoryctida (Averianov, 2003)
  - Family: †Palaeoryctidae (Winge, 1917)
    - Genus: †Aceroryctes (Rankin & Holroyd, 2014)
      - †Aceroryctes dulcis (Rankin & Holroyd, 2014)
    - Genus: †Anthraryctes (Bajpai, 2005)
      - †Anthraryctes vastanensis (Bajpai, 2005)
    - Genus: †Lainoryctes (Fox, 2004)
      - †Lainoryctes youzwyshyni (Fox, 2004)
    - Genus: †Nuryctes (Tong, 2003)
      - †Nuryctes alayensis (Lopatin & Averianov, 2004)
      - †Nuryctes gobiensis (Lopatin & Averianov, 2004)
      - †Nuryctes qinlingensis (Tong, 1997)
    - Genus: †Pinoryctes (Lopatin, 2006)
      - †Pinoryctes collector (Lopatin, 2006)
    - Subfamily: †Palaeoryctinae^{(paraphyletic subfamily)} (Winge, 1917)
      - Genus: †Aaptoryctes (Gingerich, 1982)
        - †Aaptoryctes ivyi (Gingerich, 1982)
      - Genus: †Eoryctes (Thewissen & Gingerich, 1989)
        - †Eoryctes melanus (Thewissen & Gingerich, 1989)
      - Genus: †Ottoryctes (Bloch, 2004)
        - †Ottoryctes winkleri (Bloch, 2004)
      - Genus: †Palaeoryctes^{(paraphyletic genus)} (Matthew, 1913)
        - †Palaeoryctes cruoris (Gunnell, 1994)
        - †Palaeoryctes jepseni (Bloch, 2004)
        - †Palaeoryctes puercensis (Matthew, 1913)
        - †Palaeoryctes punctatus (Van Valen, 1966)
        - †Palaeoryctes sp. [Roche Percée, Saskatchewan, Canada] (Rankin, 2018)
    - Incertae sedis:
      - †Palaeoryctidae sp. [RI 343 & RI 355] (Godinot, 1981)
      - †Palaeoryctidae sp. [Andarak 2, Osh, Kyrgyzstan] (Lopatin, 2006)
      - †Palaeoryctidae sp. indet. 1 (Pol, 1992)
      - †Palaeoryctidae sp. indet. 2 (Pol, 1992)
