= List of the Mesozoic life of North Dakota =

== A ==
- Acipenser
- †Adocus
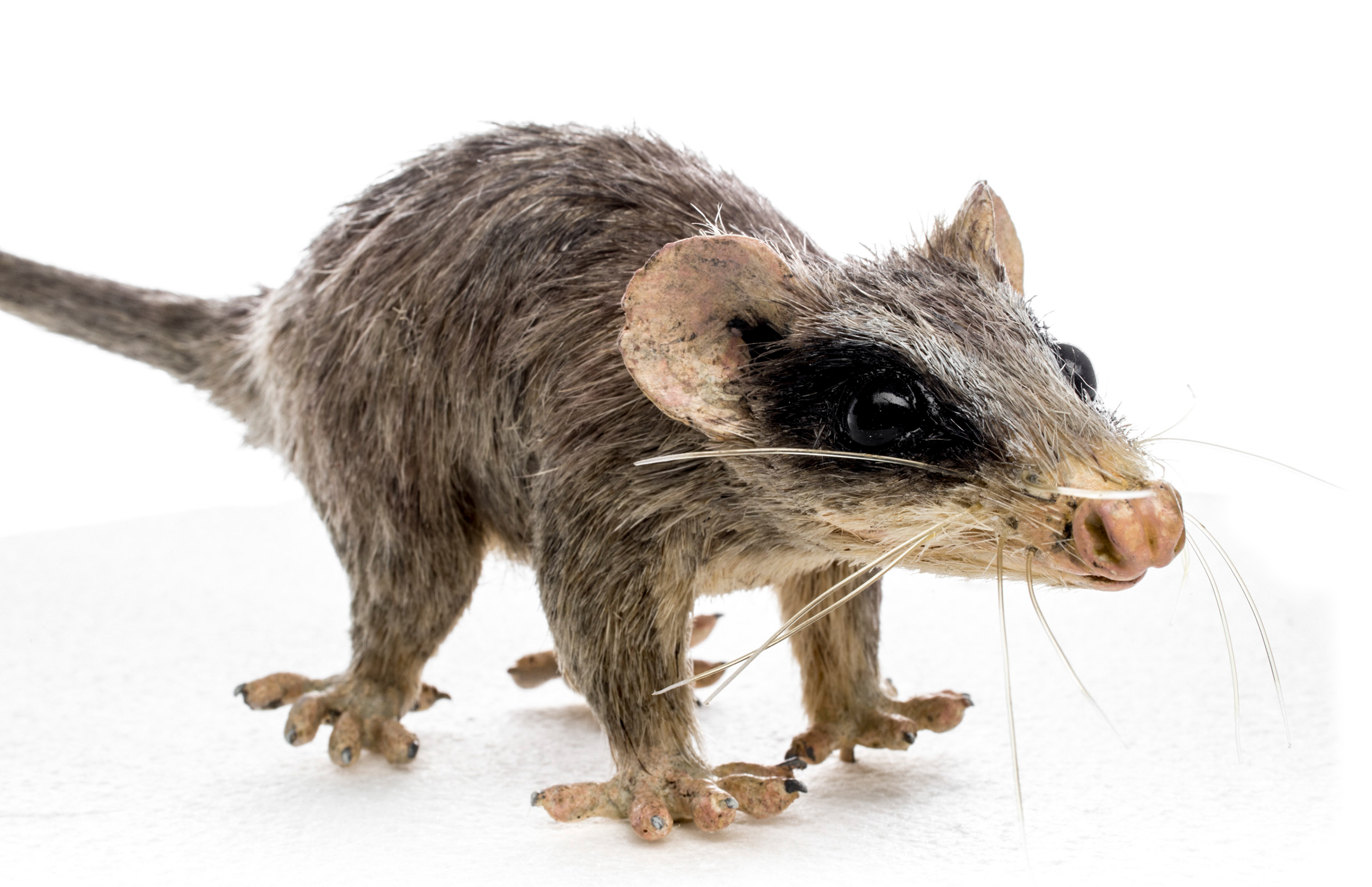
- Restorative model of the Late Cretaceous mammal Alphadon
  †Alphadon
  - †Alphadon marshi
- †Altacreodus
  - †Altacreodus magnus
- †Amersinia
  - †Amersinia FU082 – informal
  - †Amersinia FU82 – informal
- †Amesoneuron
  - †Amesoneuron FU037 – informal
  - †Amesoneuron FU37 – informal
- †Ampelopsis
  - †Ampelopsis acerifolia
- †Anomia
  - †Anomia gryphorhyncha
- †Anzu
  - †Anzu wyliei
- †Araliaephyllum
  - †Araliaephyllum polevoi
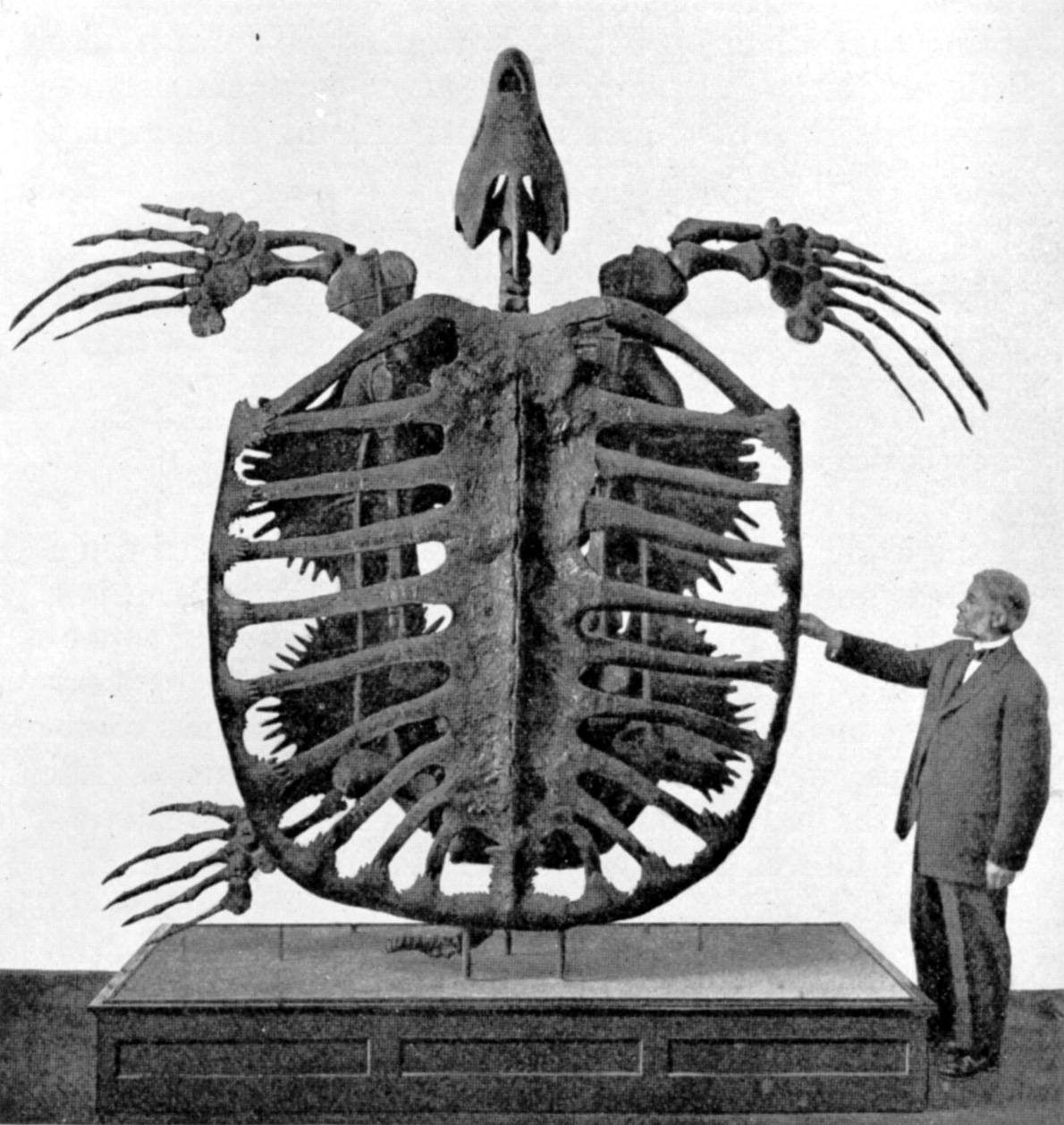
- Mounted fossilized skeleton of the Late Cretaceous sea turtle Archelon
  †Archelon
- †Artocarpus
  - †Artocarpus lessigiana
- †Asimina
  - †Asimina knowltonia
- Aspideretes
- Atractosteus
- †Avisaurus – or unidentified comparable form
  - †Avisaurus archibaldi
- †Axestemys
  - †Axestemys splendida
- Azolla
  - †Azolla gigantea – type locality for species

== B ==
- †Basilemys
  - †Basilemys sinuosa
- †Belonostomus
  - †Belonostomus longirostris
- †Bisonia
  - †Bisonia niemii
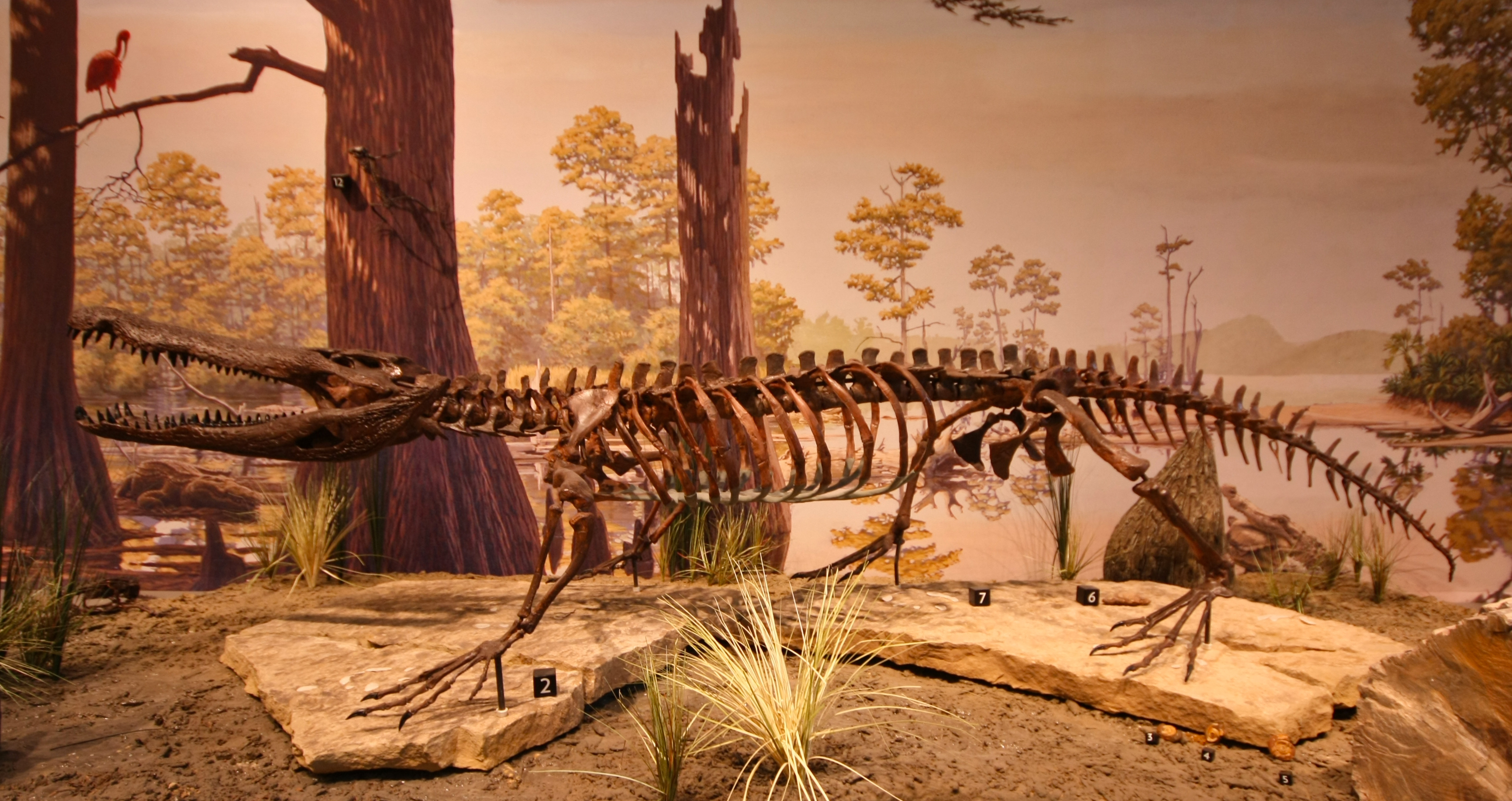
- Mounted fossilized skeleton of the Late Cretaceous crocodilian Borealosuchus
  †Borealosuchus
  - †Borealosuchus sternbergii
- †Boremys
- †Brachychampsa
  - †Brachychampsa montana

== C ==
- Campeloma
  - †Campeloma acroterion
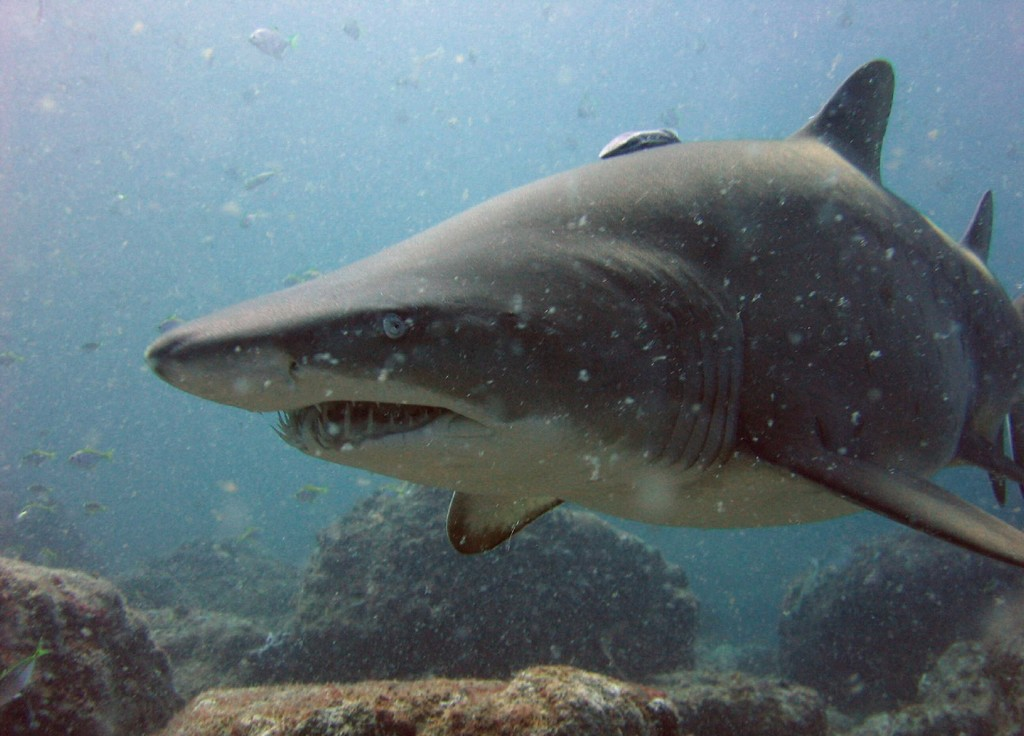
- A living Carcharias sand tiger shark
  Carcharias
- †Carpites
  - †Carpites ulmiformis
  - †Carpites verrucosus
- †Cedrobaena
  - †Cedrobaena brinkman
  - †Cedrobaena putorius
- †Celastrus
  - †Celastrus taurenensis
- †Ceratophyllum
  - †Ceratophyllum FU080 – informal
- †Cercidiphyllales
  - †Cercidiphyllales HC355 – informal
- Cercidiphyllum
  - †Cercidiphyllum ellipticum
  - †Cercidiphyllum genetrix
  - †Cercidiphyllum HC124 – informal
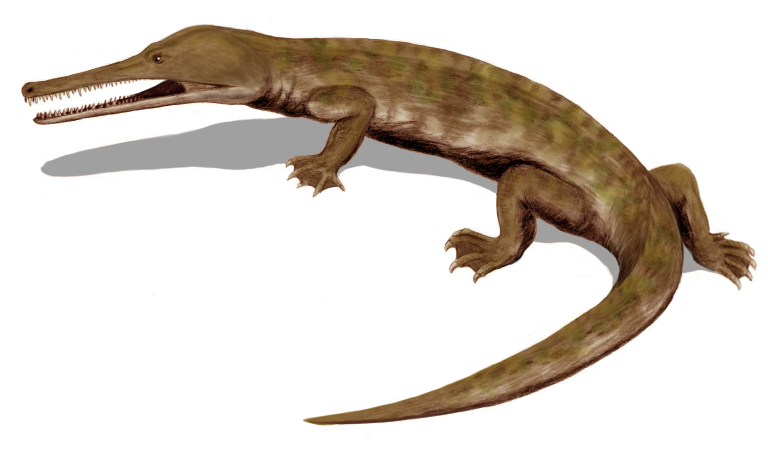
- Life restoration of the Late Cretaceous-Eocene choristoderan reptile Champsosaurus
  †Champsosaurus
  - †Champsosaurus laramiensis
- †Cimolodon
  - †Cimolodon nitidus
- Cinnamomum
  - †Cinnamomum lineafolia
- †Cissites
  - †Cissites acerifolia
  - †Cissites insignis
  - †Cissites lobata
  - †Cissites puilosokensis
- †Clisocolus
  - †Clisocolus moreauensis
- †Cocculus
  - †Cocculus flabella
- †Compsemys – type locality for genus
  - †Compsemys victa – type locality for species
- †Corbulamella
  - †Corbulamella inornata
- †Coriops
  - †Coriops amnicolus – or unidentified comparable form
- †Cornophyllum
  - †Cornophyllum newberryi
- Cornus – or unidentified related form
- †Crassatellina
  - †Crassatellina hollandi
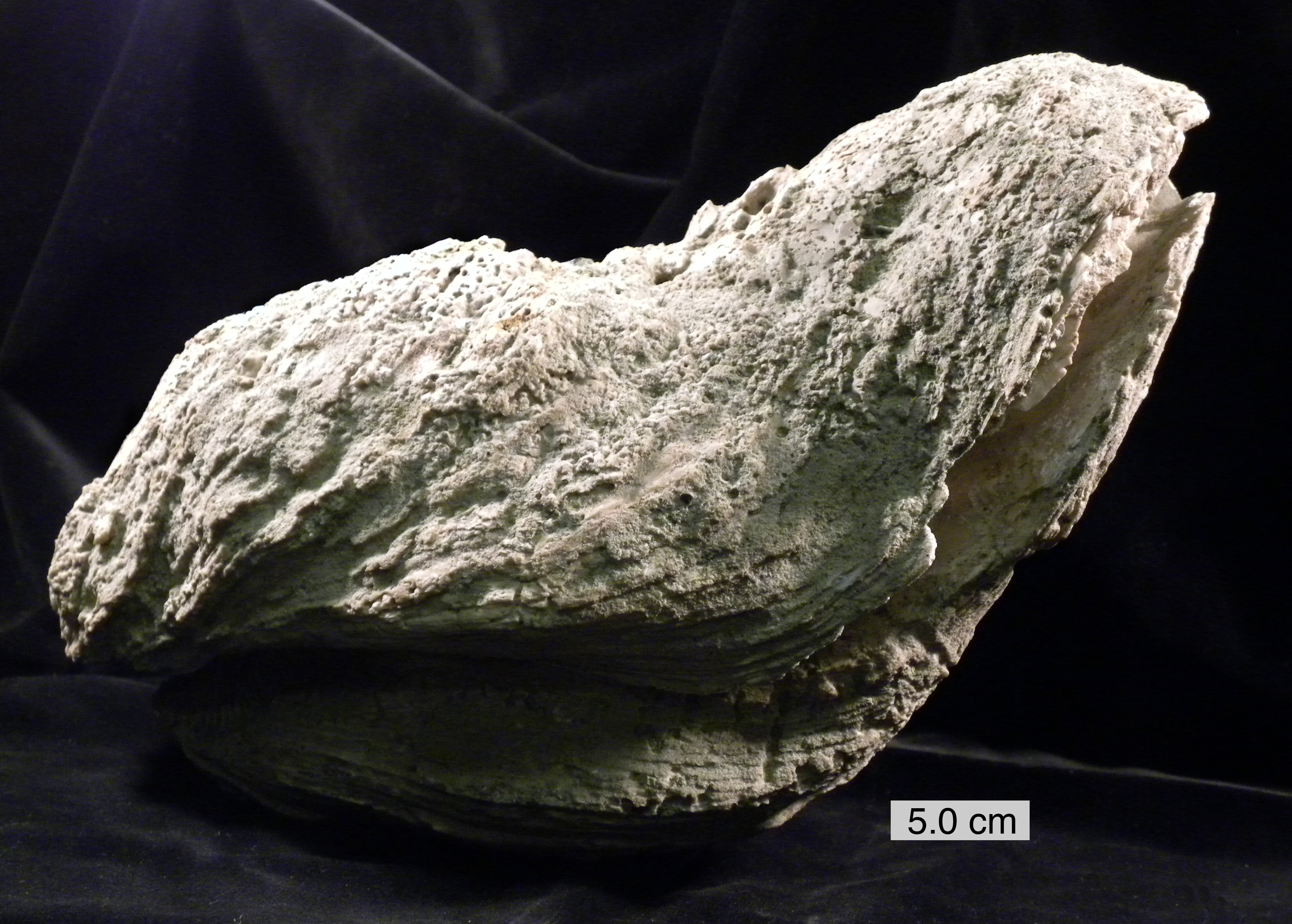
- Fossilized shell of the Cretaceous-modern oyster Crassostrea
  Crassostrea
- †Crenella
  - †Crenella elegantula
- †Cretalamna
  - †Cretalamna feldmanni – type locality for species
- Cucullaea
  - †Cucullaea nebrascensis
- †Cupressinocladus
  - †Cupressinocladus interruptus
- †Cuspidaria
  - †Cuspidaria ventricosa
- †Cyclurus
  - †Cyclurus fragosus
- †Cymbophora
  - †Cymbophora warrenana
- †Cypercites – report made of unidentified related form or using admittedly obsolete nomenclature

== D ==
- †Dalbergites – or unidentified related form
  - †Dalbergites simplex
- †Dammarites
  - †Dammarites HC257 – informal
- †Dasyatis
  - †Dasyatis northdakotaensis – type locality for species
- Dicotylophyllum
  - †Dicotylophyllum anomalum
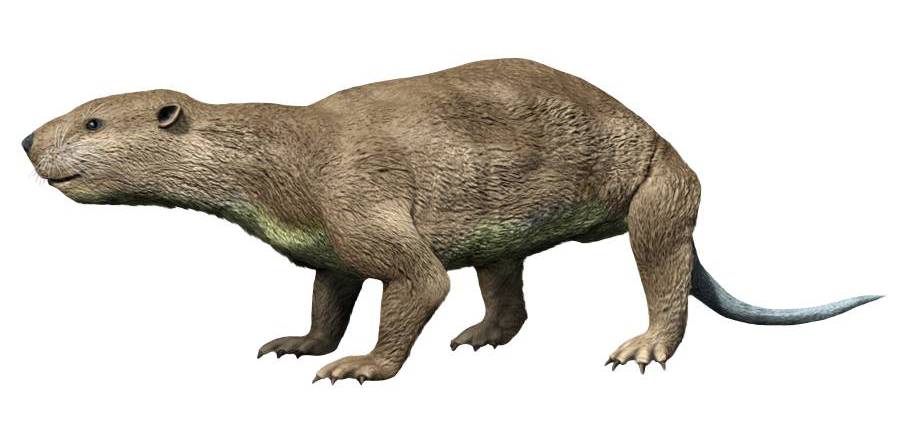
- Life restoration of the Late Cretaceous marsupial relative Didelphodon
  †Didelphodon
  - †Didelphodon vorax
- †Dosiniopsis
  - †Dosiniopsis deweyi
- †Dryophyllum
  - †Dryophyllum subfalcatum
  - †Dryophyllum tenneseensis
  - †Dryophyllum tennesseensis
  - †Dryophyllum tennessensis

== E ==
- †Edmontosaurus
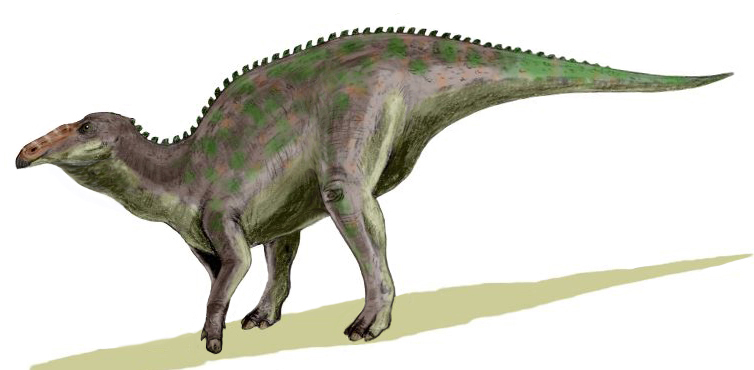
  - Life restoration of the Late Cretaceous duck-billed dinosaur Edmontosaurus annectens
    †Edmontosaurus annectens
- †Elasmodus
- †Elatides
  - †Elatides longifolia
- †Emarginachelys
  - †Emarginachelys cretacea
- †Enchodus
- †Equisetum
  - †Equisetum FU036 – informal
  - †Equisetum FU36 – informal
- †Erlingdorfia
  - †Erlingdorfia montana
- †Essonodon
  - †Essonodon browni
- †Ethmocardium
  - †Ethmocardium whitei

== F ==
- Ficus
  - †Ficus planicostata
- †Fokieniopsis
  - †Fokieniopsis catenulata

== G ==
- †Gamerabaena – type locality for genus
  - †Gamerabaena sonsalla – type locality for species
- †Gilmoremys
  - †Gilmoremys lancensis
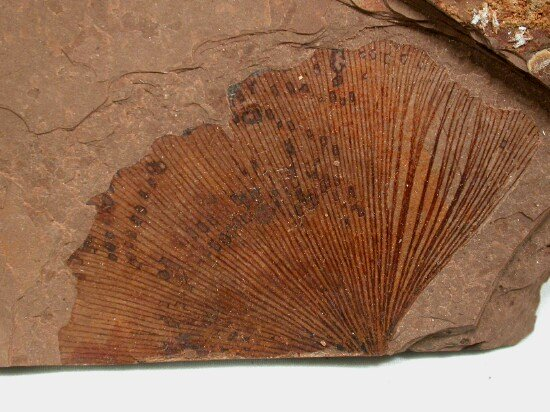
- Fossilized leaf of the Permian-modern tree Ginkgo
  Ginkgo
  - †Ginkgo adiantoides
- †Glasbius
  - †Glasbius twitchelli
- Glyptostrobus
  - †Glyptostrobus europaeus
  - †Glyptostrobus HC9 – informal
- †Goniomya
  - †Goniomya americana
- †Grammatodon
  - †Grammatodon sulcatinus
- †Grewiopsis
  - †Grewiopsis saportana
- †Gypsonictops
  - †Gypsonictops illuminatus
- †Gyrostrea
  - †Gyrostrea subtrigonalis

== H ==
- †Habrosaurus
  - †Habrosaurus dilatus
- †Harmsia
  - †Harmsia hydrocotyloidea
- †Helopanoplia
  - †Helopanoplia distincta
- †Hoplochelys
  - †Hoplochelys clark – type locality for species
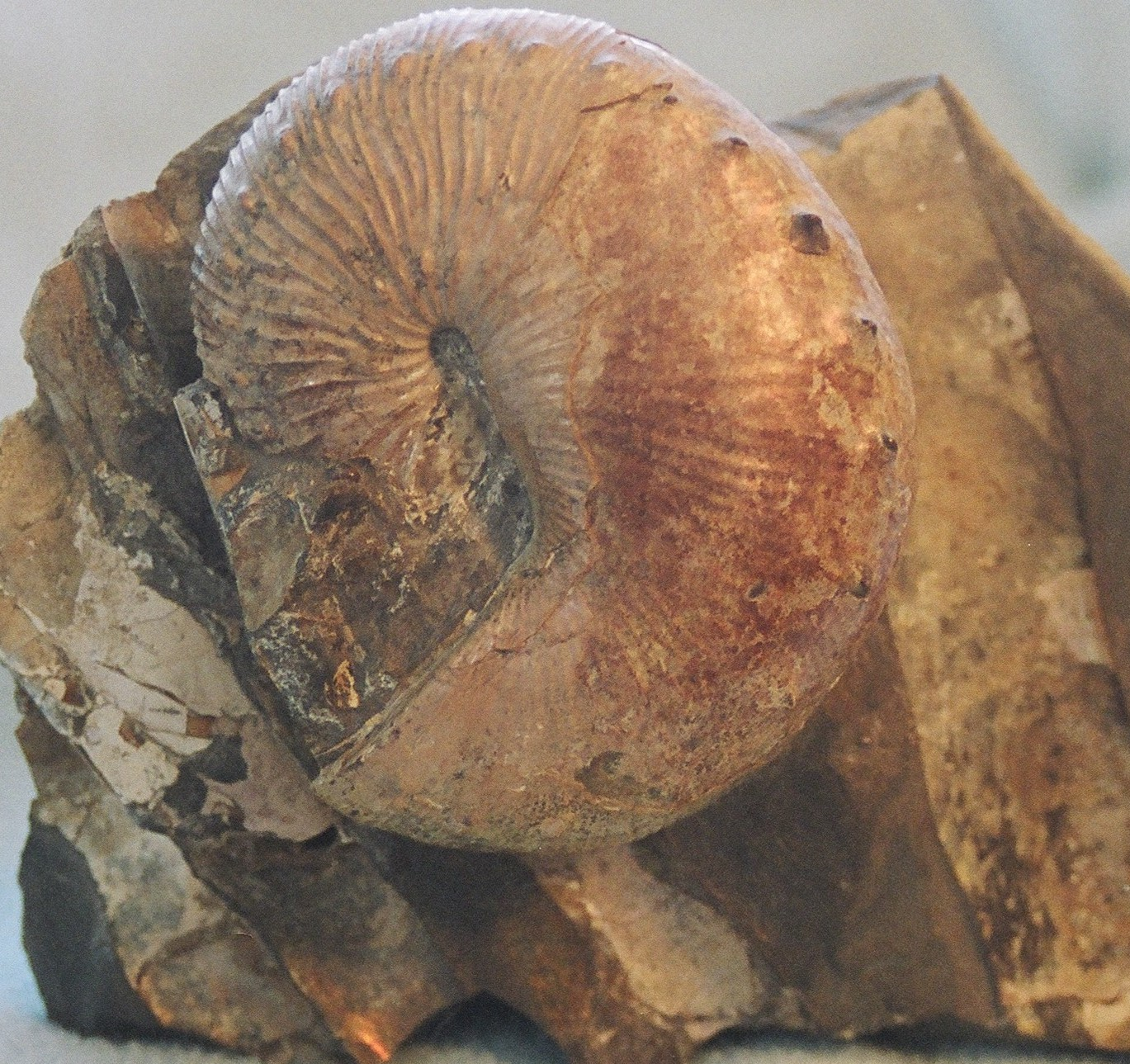
- Fossilized shell of the Late Cretaceous ammonoid cephalopod Hoploscaphites
  †Hoploscaphites
  - †Hoploscaphites nicolletii
- †Hummelichelys
  - †Hummelichelys foveatus
- †Humulus
  - †Humulus HC243 – informal
- †Hydropteris
  - †Hydropteris pinnata
- †Hypoxytoma
  - †Hypoxytoma nebrascana

== I ==
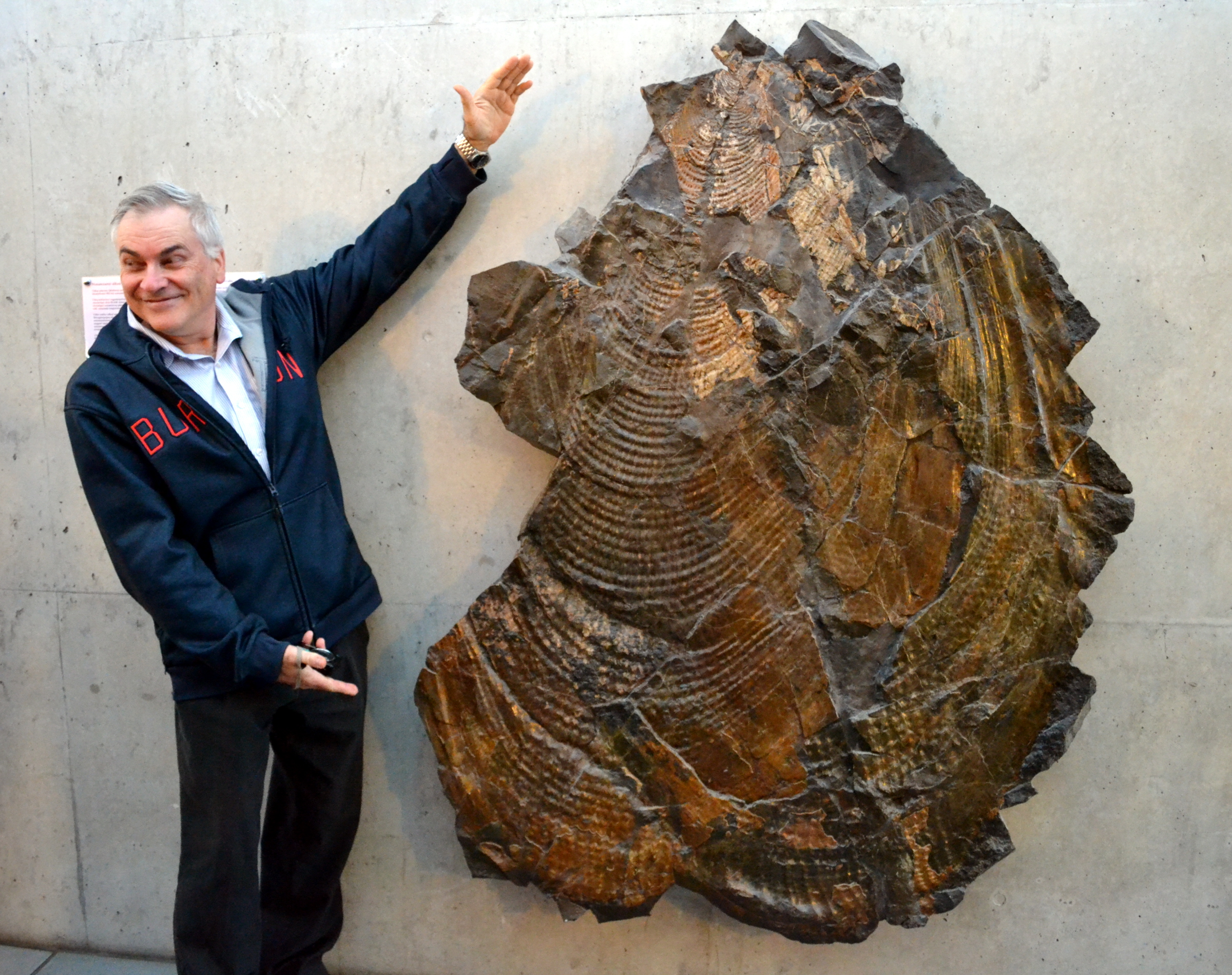
- Fossilized shell of the Early Jurassic-Late Cretaceous marine bivalve Inoceramus with a human indicating its size
  †Inoceramus – tentative report
- †Ischyodus
  - †Ischyodus rayhaasi – type locality for species
- †Ischyrhiza
  - †Ischyrhiza avonicola

== J ==
- †Judithemys
  - †Judithemys backmani
- Juglans – report made of unidentified related form or using admittedly obsolete nomenclature
  - †Juglans arctica

== L ==
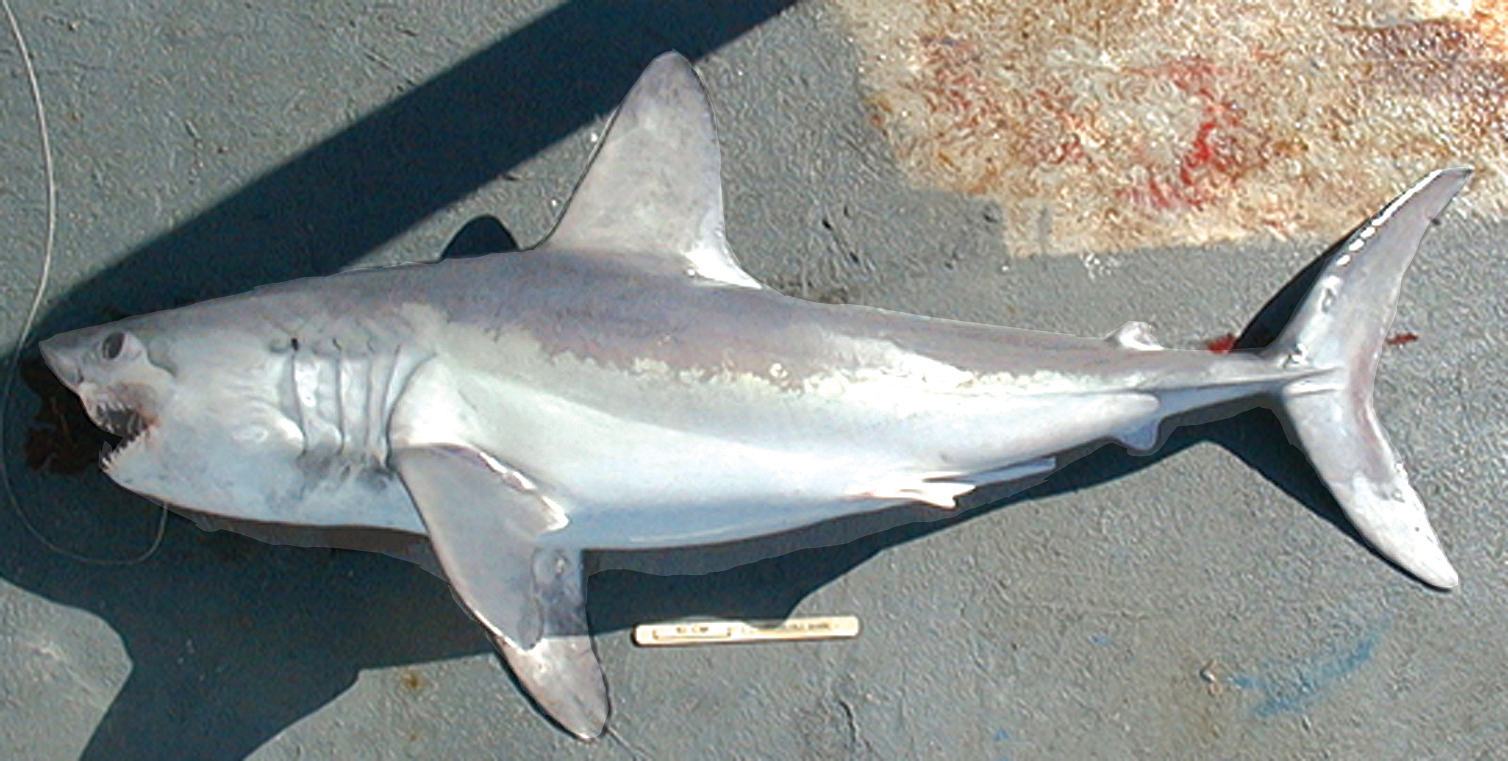
- A modern Lamna mackerel shark
  Lamna
  - †Lamna mediavia (Leriche, 1942)
- †Laurophyllum
  - †Laurophyllum lanceolatum
  - †Laurophyllum wardiana
- †Leepierceia
  - †Leepierceia preartocarpoides
- †Lemnaceae
  - †Lemnaceae scutatum
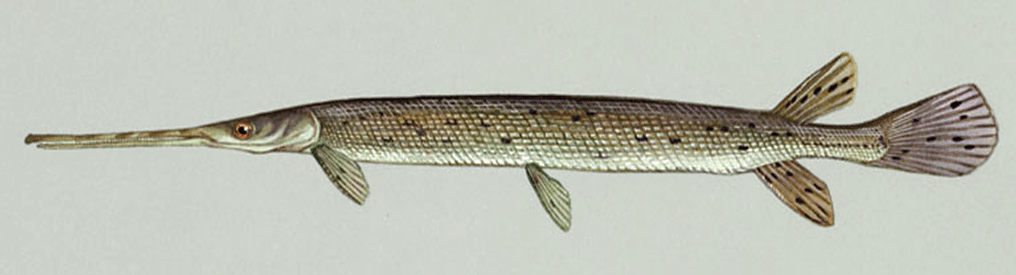
- Illustration of a living Lepisosteus, or gar
  Lepisosteus
  - †Lepisosteus occidentalis
- Limopsis
  - †Limopsis striatopunctatus
- †Lioplacodes
- †Liriodendrites
  - †Liriodendrites bradacii
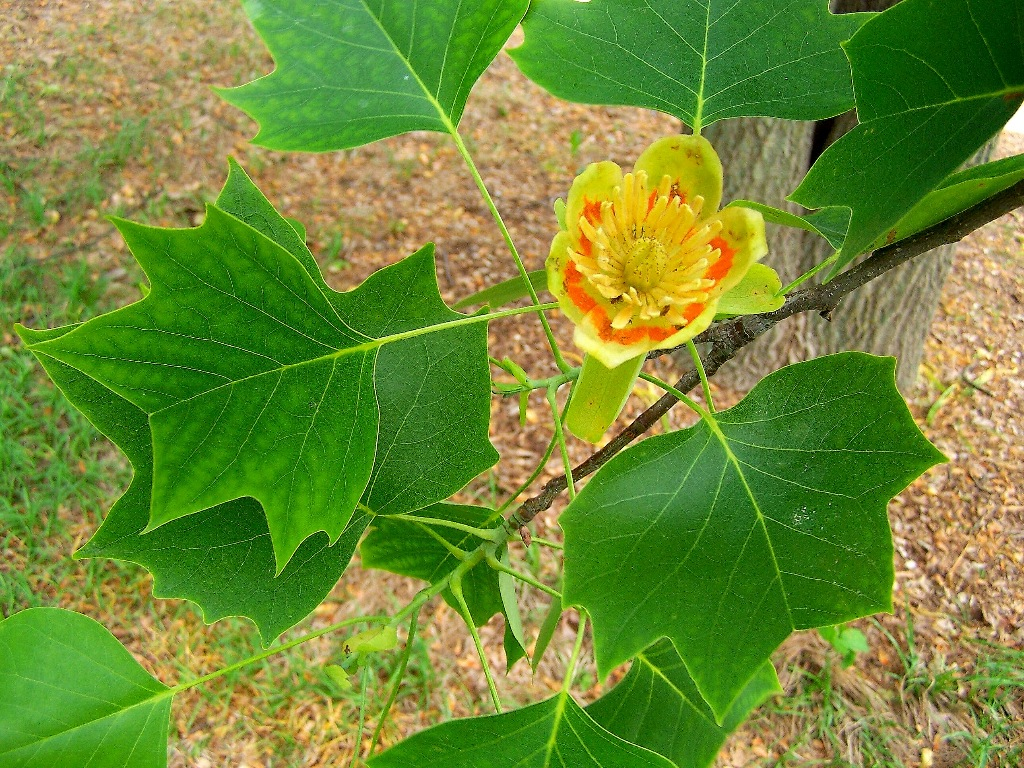
- Foliage and flower of a living Liriodendron tulipifera, or American Tulip-tree
  †Liriodendron – report made of unidentified related form or using admittedly obsolete nomenclature
  - †Liriodendron laramiense
- †Lisserpeton
  - †Lisserpeton bairdi – or unidentified comparable form
- †Lonchidion
  - †Lonchidion selachos

== M ==
- †Macclintockia – report made of unidentified related form or using admittedly obsolete nomenclature
  - †Macclintockia electilis
- Malletia
  - †Malletia evansi
- Marchantia
  - †Marchantia pealii
- †Marmarthia
  - †Marmarthia johnsonii
  - †Marmarthia pearsonii
  - †Marmarthia trivalis
  - †Marmarthia trivialis
- †Melvius
  - †Melvius thomasi
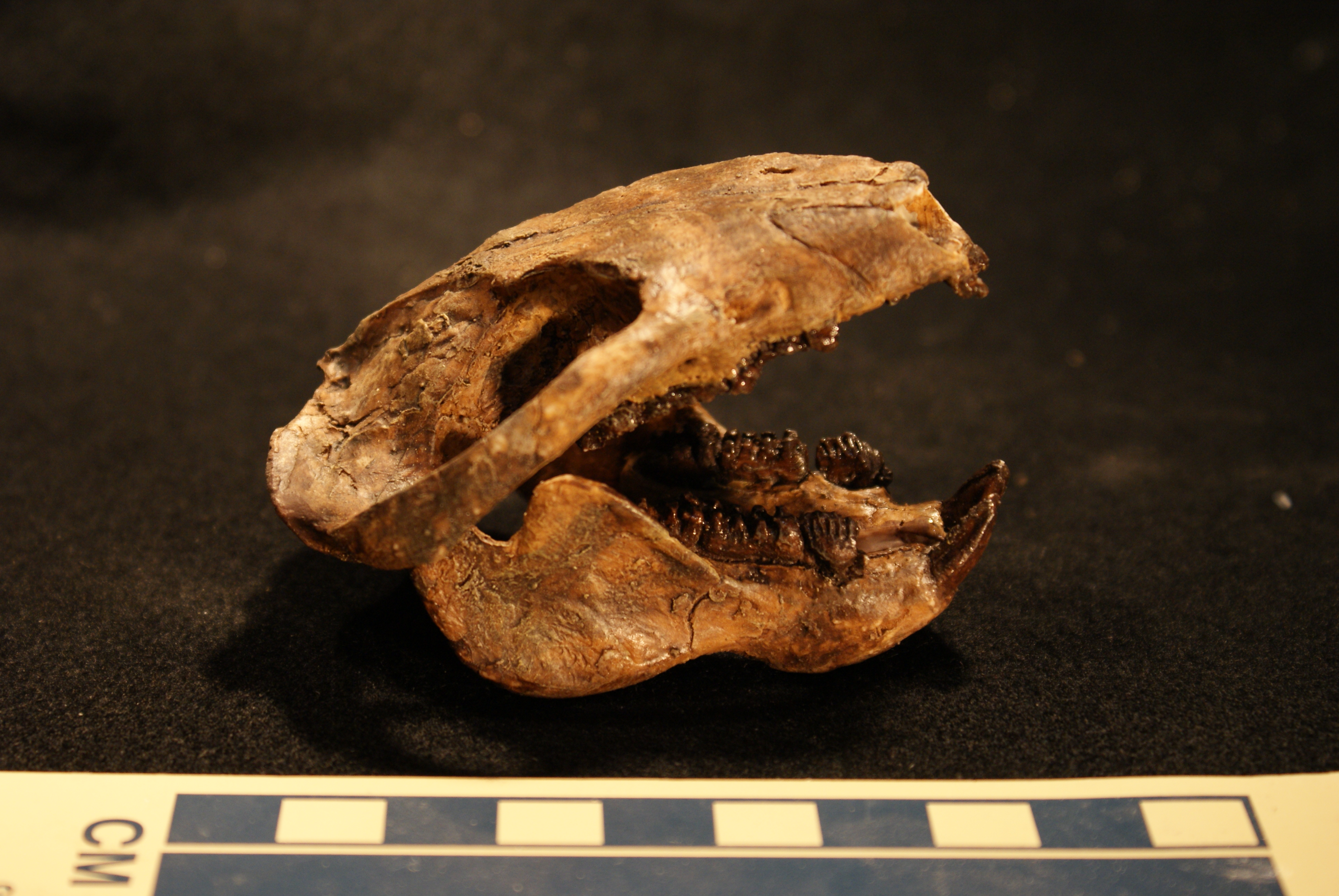
- Fossilized skull of the Late Cretaceous multituberculate mammal Meniscoessus
  †Meniscoessus
  - †Meniscoessus robustus
- †Mesocyparis
  - †Mesocyparis borealis
- †Mesodma
  - †Mesodma thompsoni
- Metasequoia
  - †Metasequoia HC035 – informal
  - †Metasequoia HC35 – informal
  - †Metasequoia occidentalis
- †Modiolus
  - †Modiolus galpinianus
- †Myledaphus
  - †Myledaphus bipartitus
- Myliobatis
  - †Myliobatis foxhillsensis – type locality for species
- Myrica
  - †Myrica torreyi

== N ==
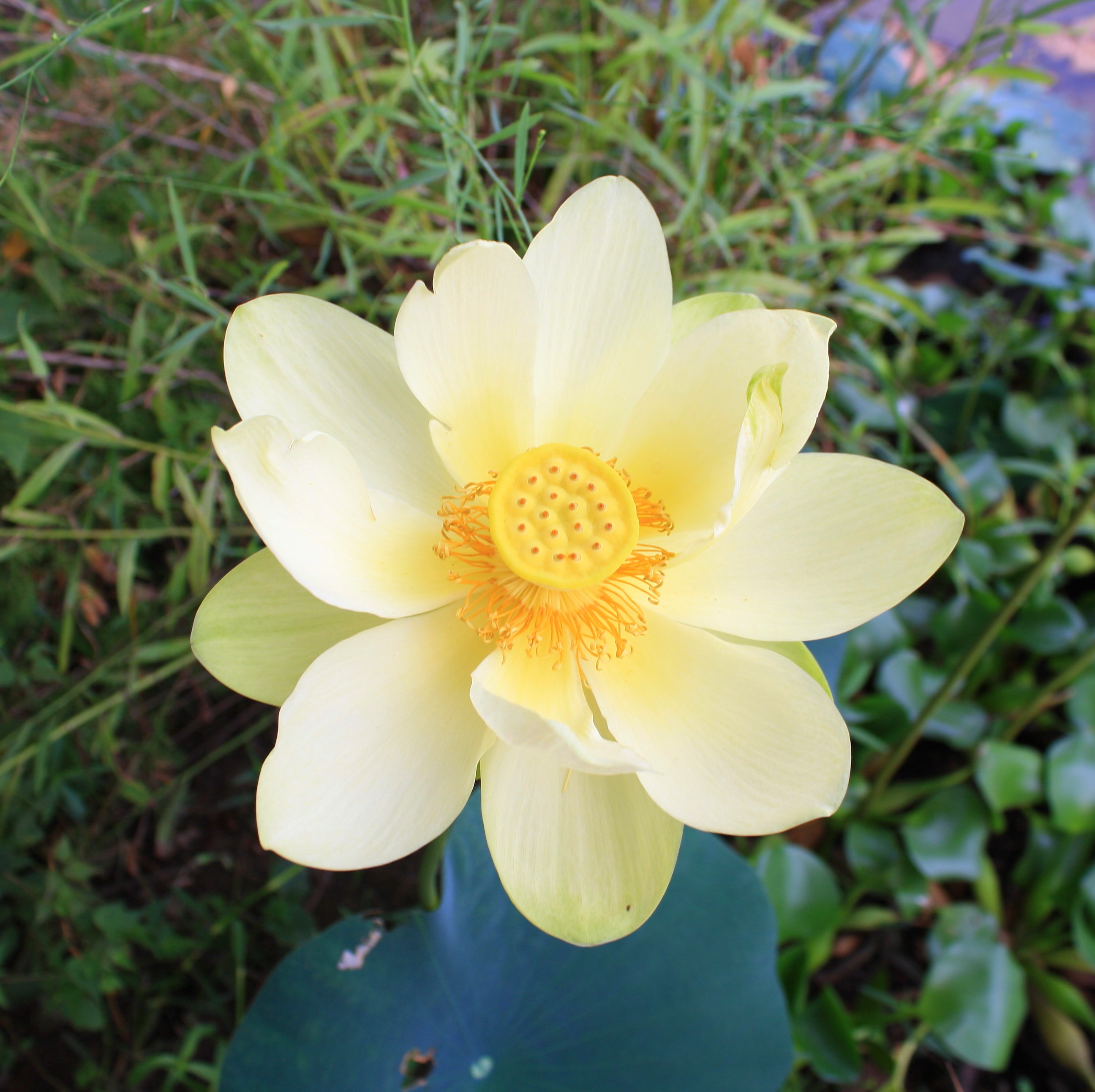
- A living Nelumbo lotus
  †Nelumbo
  - †Nelumbo FU062 – informal
  - †Nelumbo FU085 – informal
  - †Nelumbo FU62 – informal
  - †Nelumbo HC202 – informal
- †Neurankylus
- †Nilsonia
  - †Nilsonia yukonensis
- †Nilssoniocladus
  - †Nilssoniocladus comtula
  - †Nilssoniocladus yukonensis
- †Nordenskioldia
  - †Nordenskioldia borealis
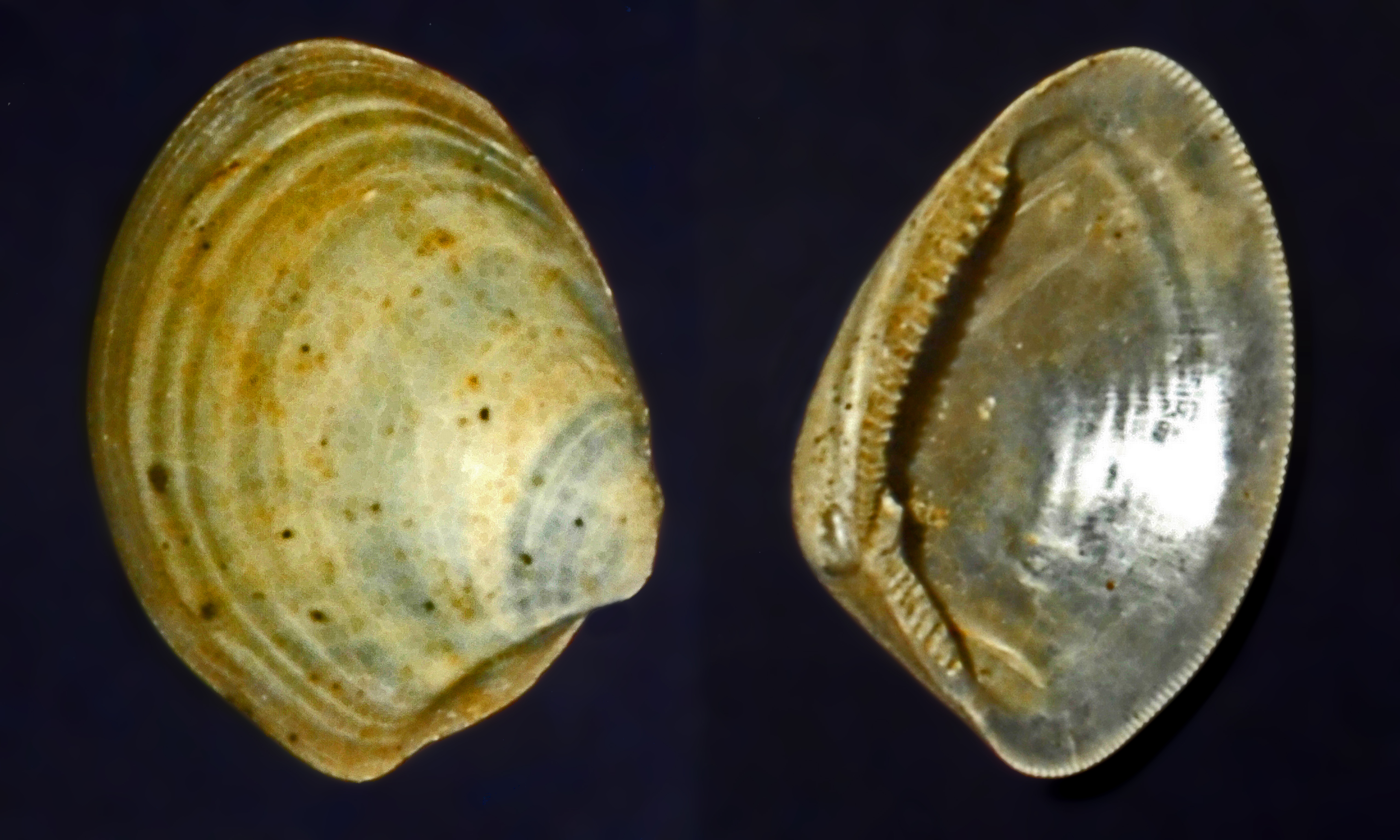
- Interior of a fossilized shell of the Early Ordovician-modern marine bivalve Nucula
  Nucula
  - †Nucula obsoletastriata
  - †Nucula planomarginata
- Nuculana
  - †Nuculana scitula
  - †Nuculana tarensis
- †Nyssidium
  - †Nyssidium arcticum

== O ==
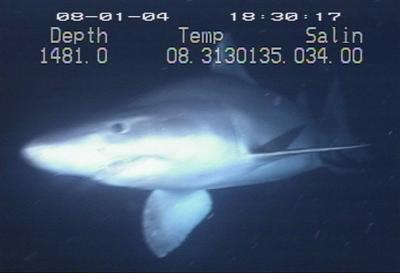
- A living Odontaspis sand shark
  Odontaspis
  - †Odontaspis macrota
- †Ophiomorpha
- †Opisthotriton
  - †Opisthotriton kayi
- †Osmunda
  - †Osmunda hollicki

== P ==
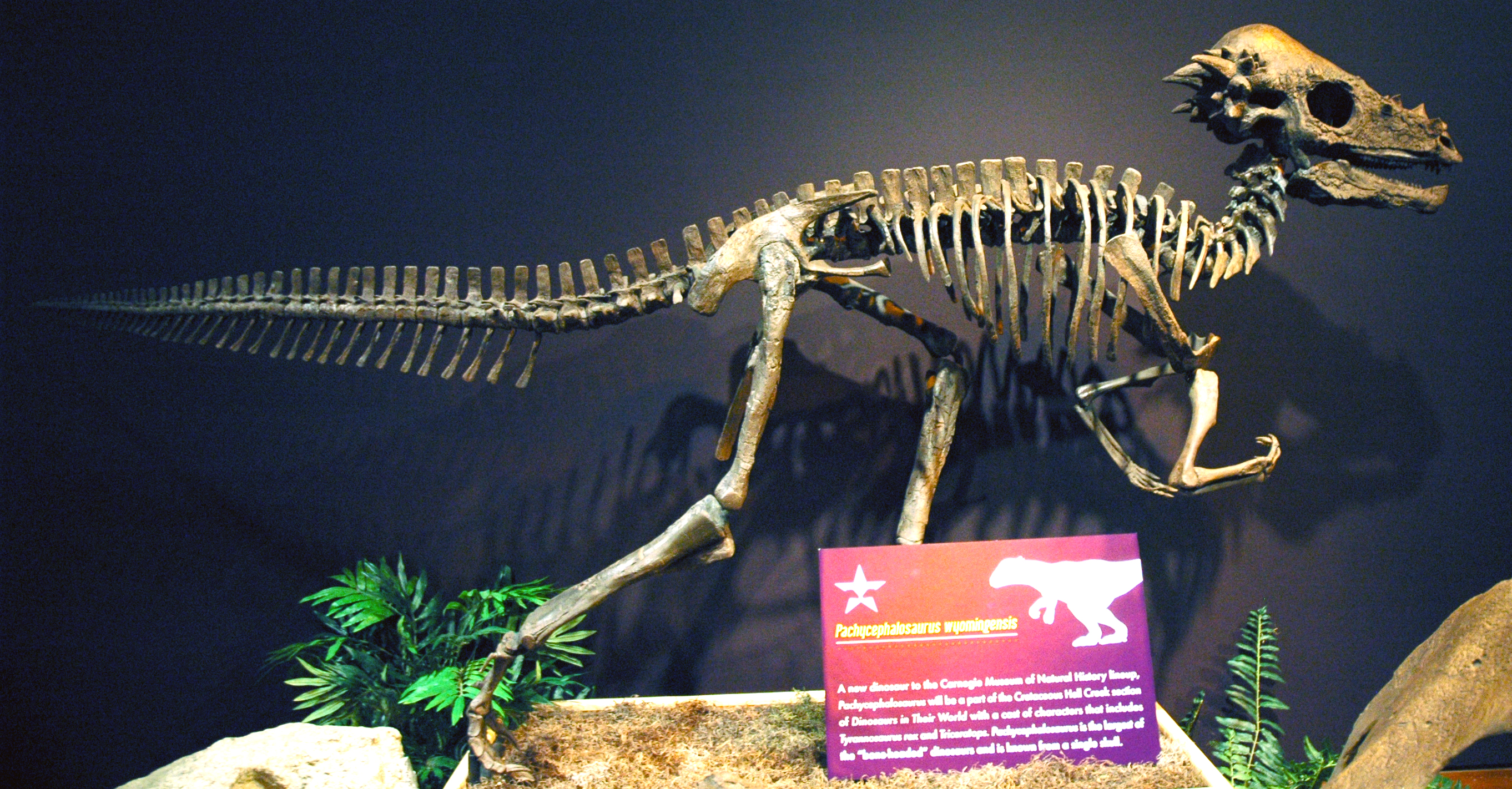
- Fossilized skeleton of the Late Cretaceous dome-headed dinosaur Pachycephalosaurus
  †Pachycephalosaurus
  - †Pachycephalosaurus wyomingensis
- †Palaeosaniwa
  - †Palaeosaniwa canadensis
- †Palatobaena
  - †Palatobaena cohen – type locality for species
- †Paleoaster
  - †Paleoaster inquirenda
- †Paloreodoxites
  - †Paloreodoxites plicatus
- Panopea
  - †Panopea occidentalis
- †Paranymphaea
  - †Paranymphaea crassifolia
  - †Paranymphaea hastata
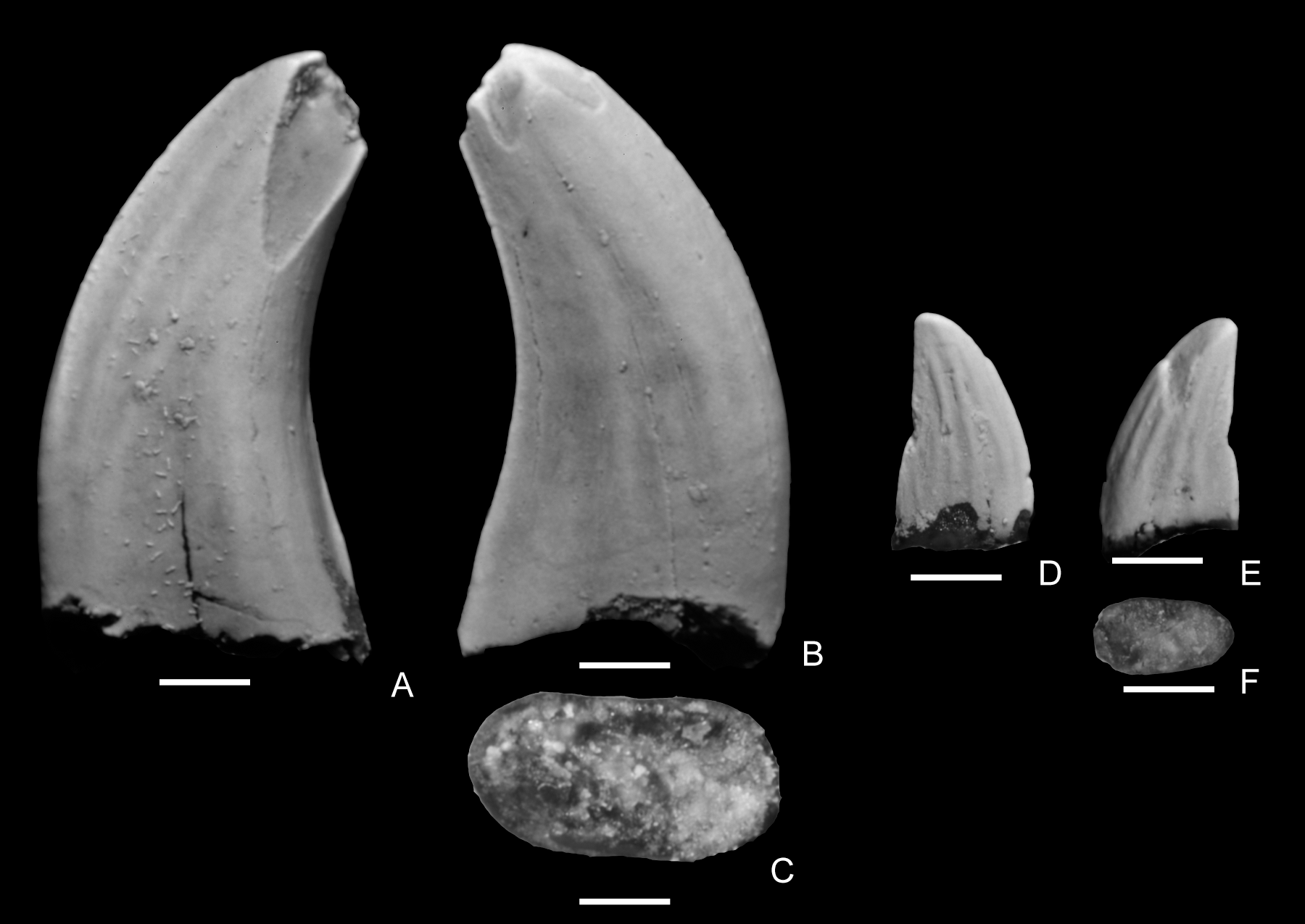
- Electron micrograph of the fossilized teeth in multiple views of the Late Cretaceous theropod dinosaur Paronychodon
  †Paronychodon
  - †Paronychodon lacustris
- Periploma
  - †Periploma subgracile
- †Phelopteria
  - †Phelopteria linguaeformis
- †Philodendron
  - †Philodendron HC201 – informal
- Physa
- †Piceoerpeton
- †Pistia
  - †Pistia corrugata
- †Platanites
  - †Platanites marginata
- Platanus
  - †Platanus raynoldsii
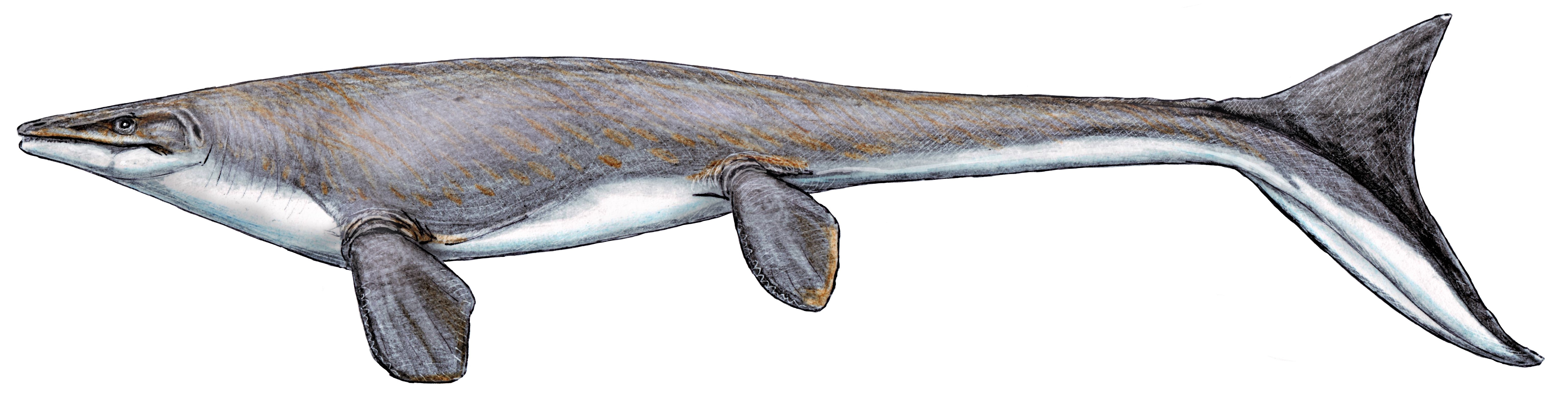
- Restoration of the Late Cretaceous mosasaur Platecarpus
  †Platecarpus
- †Plesiobaena
  - †Plesiobaena antiqua
  - †Plesiobaena antiquus
- †Plioplatecarpus
- Populus
  - †Populus nebrascensis
- †Protocardia
  - †Protocardia subquadrata
- †Protolambda
  - †Protolambda florencae
- †Protochelydra
- †Pseudoptera
  - †Pseudoptera subtortuosa
- †Pterospermites
  - †Pterospermites cordata

== Q ==
- †Quereuxia
  - †Quereuxia angulata

== R ==
- †Rhamnus
  - †Rhamnus cleburni
  - †Rhamnus salicifolius
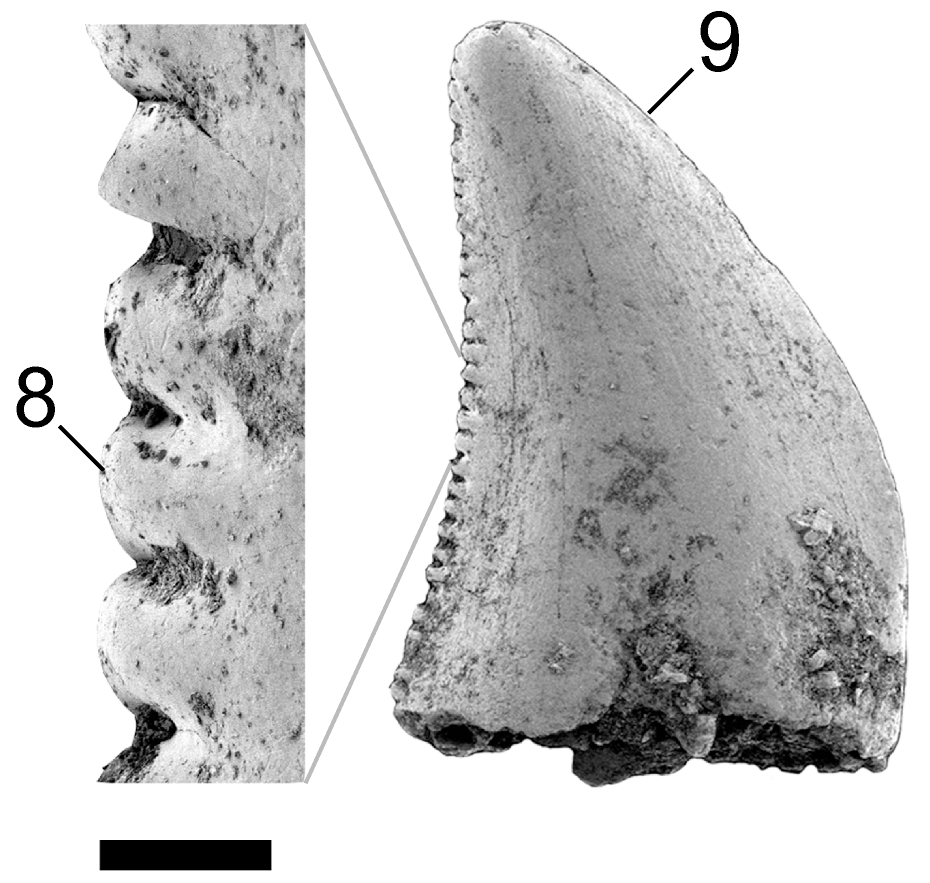
- Micrograph with magnified inset of a fossilized tooth of the Late Cretaceous theropod dinosaur Richardoestesia
  †Richardoestesia
  - †Richardoestesia isosceles

== S ==
- †Salvinia
  - †Salvinia HC312 – informal
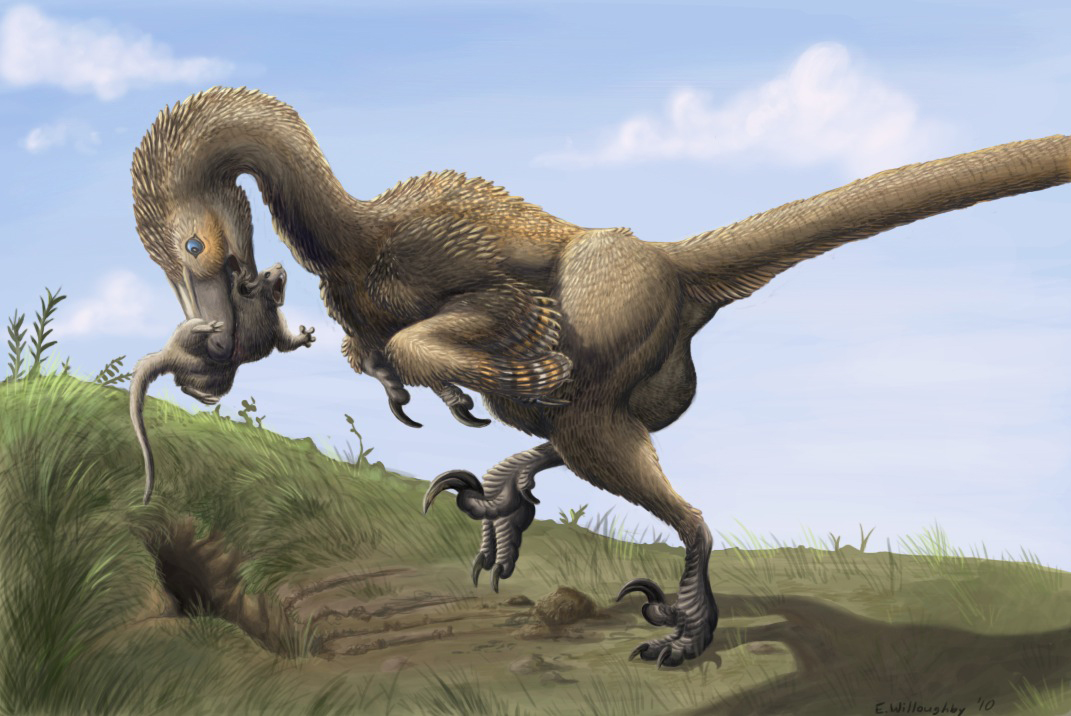
- Life restoration of the Late Cretaceous dromaeosaurid Saurornitholestes preying upon a multituberculate mammal
  †Saurornitholestes
- †Scapanorhynchus – tentative report
- †Scapherpeton
  - †Scapherpeton tectum
- †Scaphites
  - †Scaphites corvensis
  - †Scaphites mariasensis
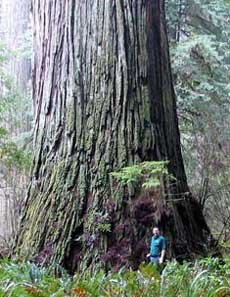
- Base of the trunk of a living Sequoia tree with a human to scale
  †Sequoia
  - †Sequoia HC070 – informal
  - †Sequoia HC70 – informal
  - †Sequoia obovata – or unidentified comparable form
- †Sourimis
  - †Sourimis equilateralis
- Sphaerium
- †Squatirhina
  - †Squatirhina americana
- †Syncyclonema
  - †Syncyclonema halli

== T ==
- †Tancredia
  - †Tancredia americana
- Taxodium
  - †Taxodium HC071 – informal
  - †Taxodium olrikii
- †Tellinimera
  - †Tellinimera scitula
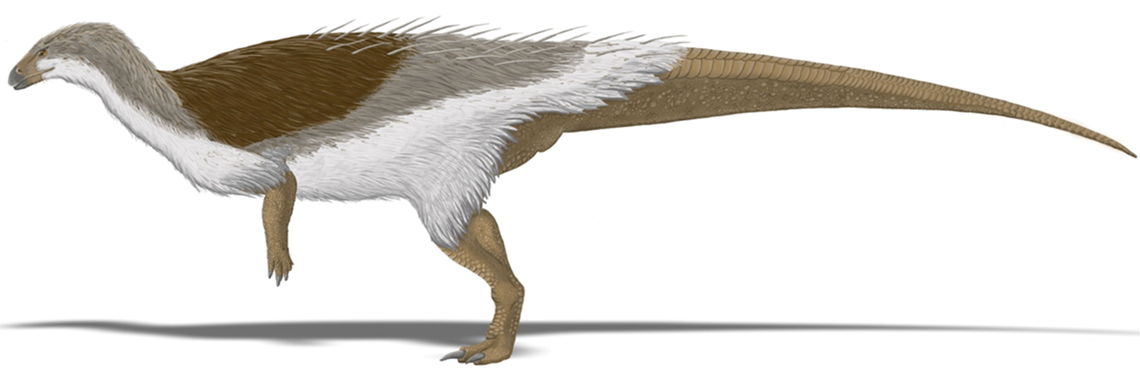
- Life restoration of the Late Cretaceous herbivorous dinosaur Thescelosaurus
  †Thescelosaurus
  - †Thescelosaurus neglectus
- †Thoracosaurus
  - †Thoracosaurus neocesariensis
- †Torosaurus
  - †Torosaurus latus
- †Trachodon
- †Triceratops
  - †Triceratops horridus
  - †Triceratops prorsus
- †Trochodendroides
  - †Trochodendroides nebrascensis
- †Troodon
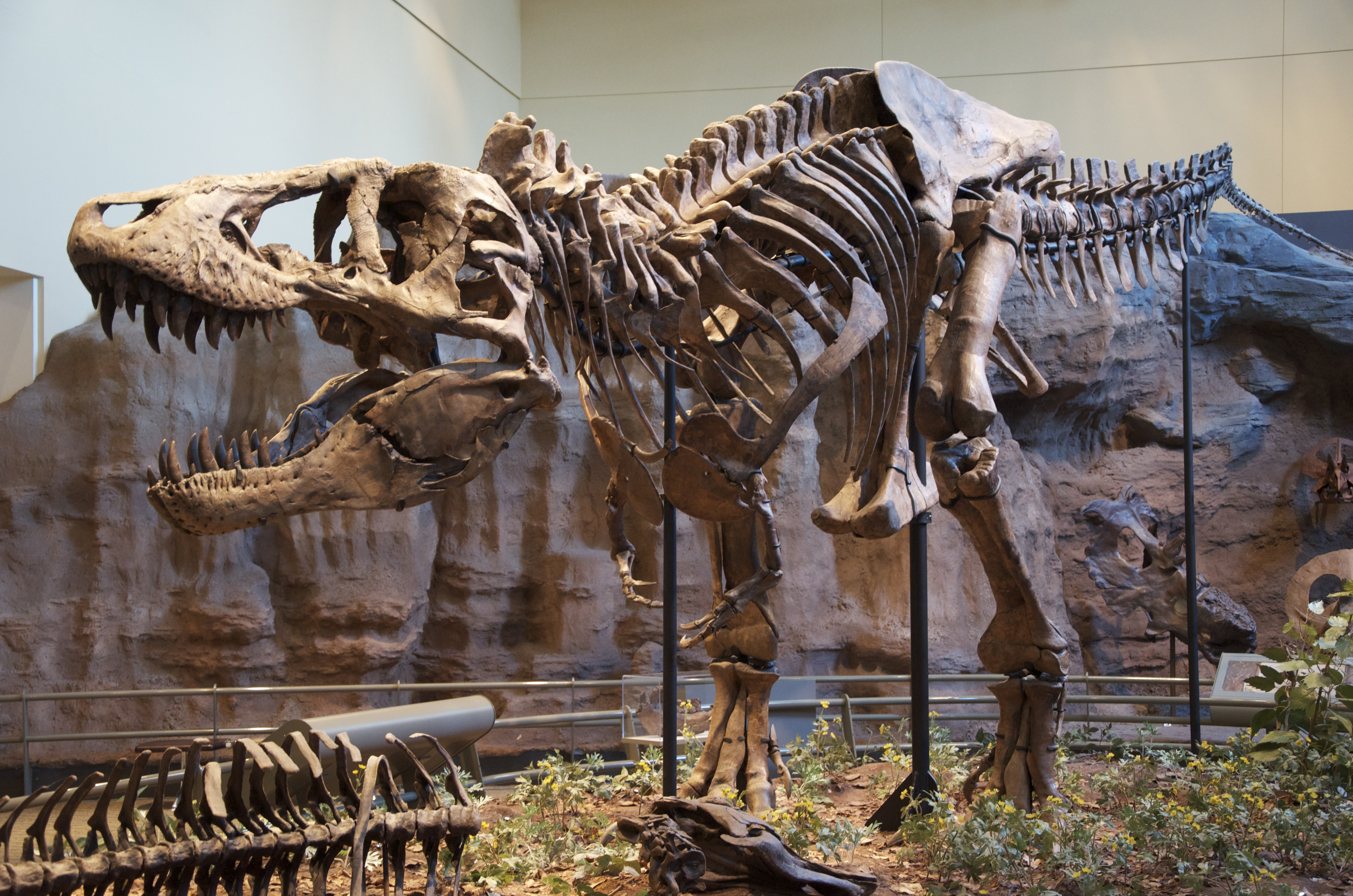
- Fossilized skeleton of the Late Cretaceous tyrannosaur Tyrannosaurus
  †Tyrannosaurus
  - †Tyrannosaurus rex

== V ==
- †Vetericardiella
  - †Vetericardiella crenalirata
- Vitis
  - †Vitis stantonii

== Z ==
- †Zingiberopsis
  - †Zingiberopsis attenuata
  - †Zingiberopsis magnifolia
- Ziziphus
  - †Ziziphus fibrillosus
