= Blue heron =

Blue heron may refer to:

== Birds ==
- Great blue heron, a large wading bird
- Little blue heron, a small heron

== Locations ==
- Blue Heron Airport, a privately owned public-use airport in Schoharie County, New York, United States
- Blue Heron, Kentucky, United States
- Blue Heron Lake, Canada
- Blue Heron Park Preserve, New York City, New York, United States
- Great Blue Heron Casino, Canada
- The Blue Heron Lodge of the Tidewater Council of the Boy Scouts of America

== Music ==
- Blue Heron (vocal ensemble), a professional vocal ensemble based in the Boston area
- The Great Blue Heron Music Festival

== Other ==
- Blue Heron Powered Parachutes, an American brand of aircraft
- RV Blue Heron, a research vessel in the United States.
- Blue Heron (film), a 2025 film by Sophy Romvari
