= Large Lakes Observatory =

- Established: 1994
- Field of research: Limnology, Biogeochemistry, Ecology, Water Resources
- Director: Dr. Robert Sterner
- Staff: 35+
- Address: 2205 E. 5th Street
- Location: Duluth, MN USA, United States of America
- Nickname: LLO
- Affiliations: University of Minnesota Duluth
- Website: scse.d.umn.edu/large-lakes-observatory

The Large Lakes Observatory (or LLO) is a research institute located in Duluth, Minnesota, USA which studies the major lakes of the world. The researchers focus on a variety of sciences including aquatic chemistry, geochemistry and paleoclimatology. Its stated purpose dedicates the LLO to "performing innovative, cross-disciplinary research, education, and outreach that advance scientific understanding of Earth’s large lakes for the benefit of society and the sustainability of freshwaters." The parent institution of LLO is the University of Minnesota Duluth.

== History ==
The Large Lakes Observatory was founded in 1994, after a 1988 scientific and policy conference resulted in the formation of the "Institute for Lake Superior Research" which developed into the LLO. It moved into its present location in the Research Laboratory Building in Duluth, MN after a fire in the former Old Main campus building (now the site of Old Main Park) left the Model School building untouched. LLO moved into the Model School Building shortly thereafter. Past directors of LLO include Dr. Tom Johnson and Dr. Steve Colman.

Scientific expeditions carried out by LLO scientists have visited all of the Laurentian Great Lakes, the East African Rift Lakes, Lake Issyk Kul, Lake Nicaragua, Lake Qinghai, Great Slave Lake, and others.

== Research vessels ==
The LLO operates the R/V Blue Heron as the only University National Oceanographic Laboratory System vessel on the Great Lakes. The R/V Blue Heron has an overall length of 26 m and berths for 11 party members. In 2024, researchers on the vessel discovered an apparently new life form, temporarily named "ShipGoo001".

== Outreach ==
Large Lakes Observatory members coordinate and participate in various public outreach events. These include annual tours of the R/V Blue Heron, a permanent exhibit at the Great Lakes Aquarium, and public data portals for LLO-managed water quality instruments.
