= Blue Heron Lake =

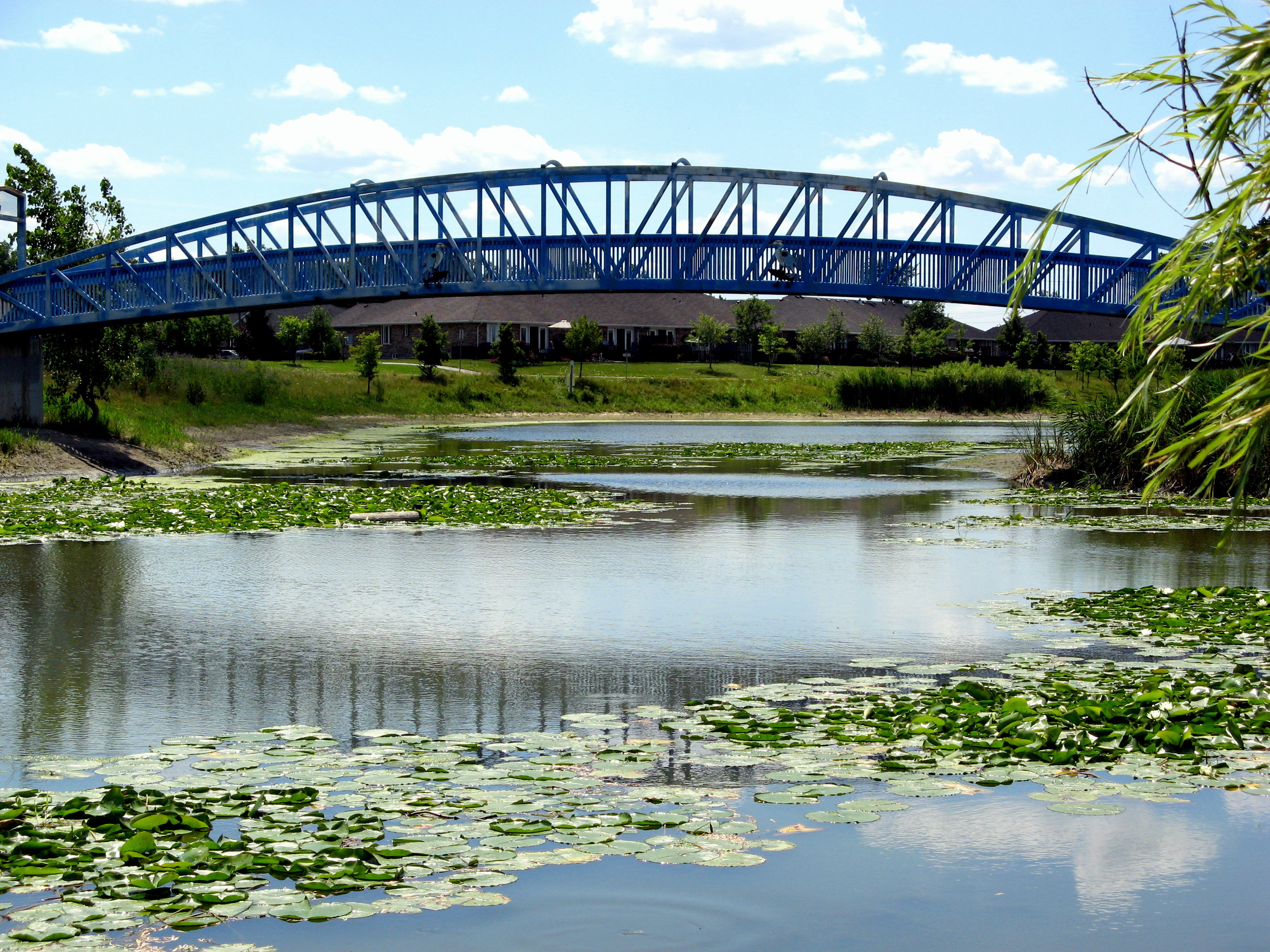
- Blue Heron Bridge spanning over Blue Heron Lake

- Location within Ontario
- Location: Windsor, Ontario
- Coordinates: 42°19′30″N 82°53′55″W
- Lake type: reservoir
- Basin countries: Canada
- Max. length: .35 km (0.22 mi)
- Max. width: .33 km (0.21 mi)
- Max. depth: 8 m (26 ft)
- Surface elevation: 177 m (581 ft)

Blue Heron Lake is an L-shaped man-made lake located in East Riverside Park in the east of Windsor, Ontario, Canada. Created in 1997, it serves to treat the outflow from several storm water drains.

== Wildlife ==
Many reptiles make the habitat around the lake their home; the snakes are garter snake, fox snake and northern water snakes. There are turtles such as: painted turtles, snapping turtles, musk turtles, red-eared sliders, yellow-bellied sliders, and northern map turtles. There have been many reports of an enormous snapping turtle, dubbed by local residents as "Colossal", with a carapace length of 3 feet (1 m). It was lured onto shore by two local residents in the summer of 2017, the only reported time it had been captured, but was not officially measured. There was a turtle slightly larger, almost 5 feet, but it died during the winter of 2004–2005. There are also many birds such as gulls, herons, sparrows, red-winged blackbirds, geese and ducks. The lake area is a favorite spot for children: they sport fish off of the Blue Heron Lake bridge and other areas around the lake. There are many fish in the lake such as sunfish, bluegill, pumpkinseed, perch, bass, koi, pike, minnows, shad, carp and catfish. It has been confirmed that there is a muskellunge in Blue Heron Lake. The lake has a maximum depth of 8 metres (26 ft). White tailed deer have been seen on the hill near Blue Heron off Banwell.

== Recreational Use ==
Blue Heron Lake was connected with the Ganatchio Trail in July 2006. Many people come to the lake to run or walk. During winter when the lake freezes, it is used for ice skating or to play hockey. In summer months, people will go canoeing and courses are held to teach how to do so. Fishing is something that many do. A park is across the street and to the southwest corner of the lake. A great blue bridge occupies the center of the lake to cross over, and a hill is near by which used to be a landfill, called East Riverside Hill.
