= Chelydrops =

Chelydrops Temporal range: Miocene

Scientific classification
- Domain: Eukaryota
- Kingdom: Animalia
- Phylum: Chordata
- Class: Reptilia
- Order: Testudines
- Suborder: Cryptodira
- Family: Chelydridae
- Genus: †Chelydrops; Peters, 1868
- Species: †C. stricta

Binomial name
- †Chelydrops stricta (Matthew, 1924)

Extinct genus of turtles

Chelydrops is an extinct genus of Chelydridae from Miocene of North America. Only one species is described, Chelydrops stricta (Matthew, 1924).

The genus was considered by Hutchison (2008) to be a junior synonym of the genus Macrochelys, containing the alligator snapping turtle; Hutchison transferred the species C. stricta to the genus Macrochelys.
