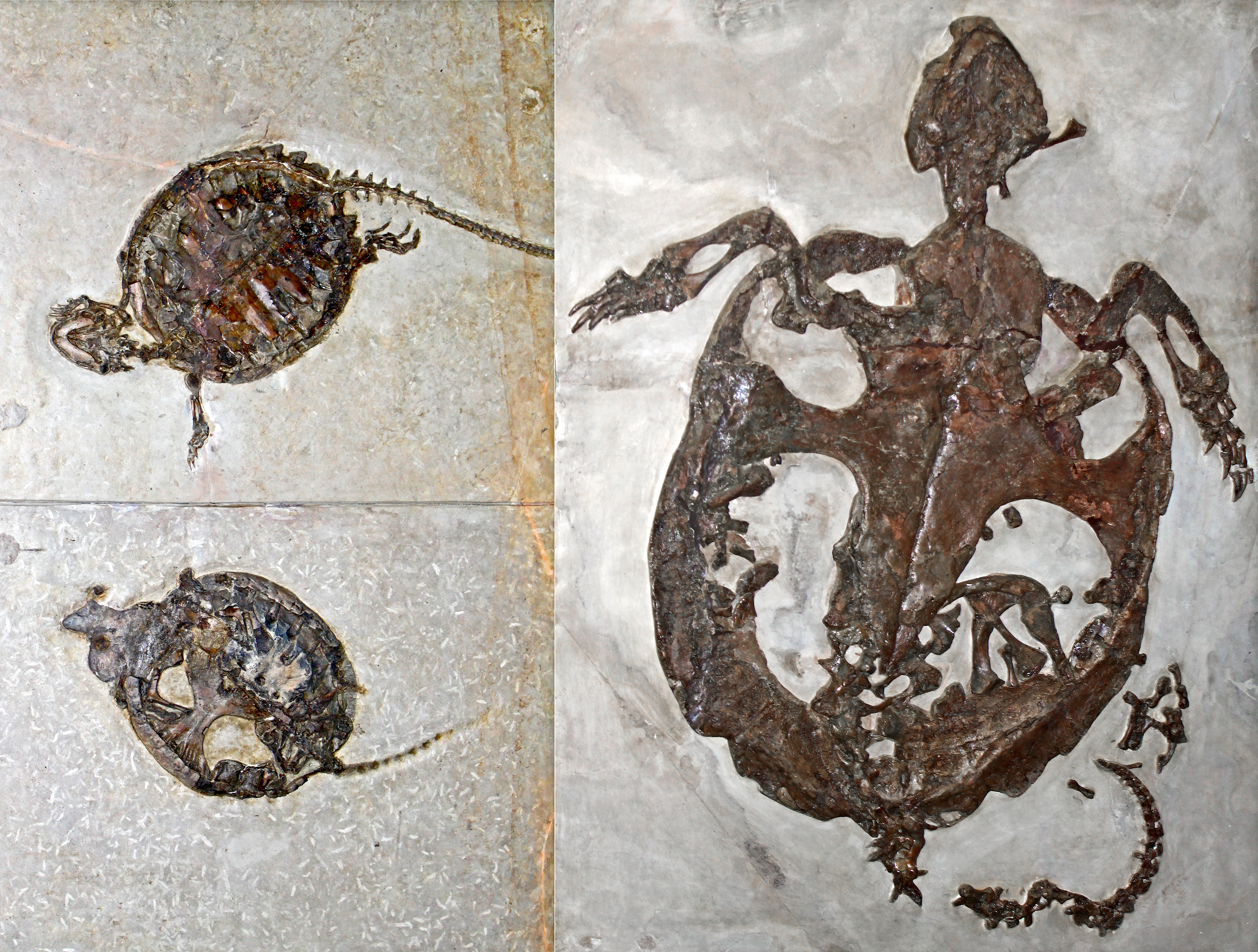
- Chelydropsis murchisoni. Left: juvenile, right: adult

Scientific classification
- Kingdom: Animalia
- Phylum: Chordata
- Class: Reptilia
- Order: Testudines
- Suborder: Cryptodira
- Family: Chelydridae
- Genus: †Chelydropsis; Peters, 1868

Species
- †Chelydropsis aubasi Joyce, Landréat & Rollot, 2022; †Chelydropsis decheni (von Meyer, 1852); †Chelydropsis heweneggensis Pappa et al., 2024; †Chelydropsis kusnetzovi (Chkhikvadze in Gaiduchenko and Chkhikvadze, 1985); †Chelydropsis murchisoni (Bell, 1836); †Chelydropsis pontica (Pidoplichko & Tarashchuk, 1960)

Synonyms
- Macrocephalochelys Piboplichko & Taraschchuk, 1960

= Chelydropsis =

Chelydropsis Temporal range: Bartonian–Pliocene

Extinct genus of turtles

Chelydropsis is an extinct genus in the family of pan-chelydrids, relatives of modern snapping turtles, that lived from the Eocene to the Pliocene in Asia and Europe.

== Species ==
- C. aubasi

This is the oldest snapping turtle known from Europe, with its remains dating to the Middle Eocene (more specifically, the MP15 of the Bartonian). It was described on the basis of various shell fragments, discovered at Chéry-Chartreuve in France.

- C. decheni

C. decheni has been reported from Late Oligocene sites in France and Germany, as well as an early Miocene site in Navarre, Spain, this species probably also includes fossils originally described as C. apellanizi and C. sanctihenrici.

- C. heweneggensis

This species is only known from the southwestern German site of Höwenegg, which dates to 10.3 Ma, and also gave the species its name. The holotype is an almost completely preserved skeleton.

- C. murchisoni

C. murchisoni is known from a variety of Miocene sites, including Steinheim in Germany, where dozens of complete specimens were discovered. Joyce suggests that various other species, including C. carinata and C. sansaniensis, are in fact synonymous with this species. It is the most widely distributed species in the genus, being known from large parts of Europe, and existing from the early Miocene to early Pliocene epoch.

- C. kusnetzovi

This species is known from Pliocene fossils discovered in Kazakhstan's Pavlodar region, and differs from its European relatives in its narrower anterior plastral lobe. However, the material from Kazakhstan has to be described more throughoutly to allow for a clearer diagnosis of the species.

- C. pontica

Redescribed in 2017, C. pontica was found in Ukrainian rocks dating to the Late Miocene.

=== Species of questionable validity ===
- C. apellanizi
- C. manuascensis
- C. minax
- C. murchisoni
- C. poena
- C. sanctihenrici
- C. staeschei
- C. strausi

== Description ==
The broad and flat triturating surfaces of Chelydropsis suggest that they were specialized molluscivores, unlike modern snapping turtles. It was a large turtle, reaching carapax lengths of 65–70 cm, though a general increase in size over time is apparent in the European lineage.

== Distribution and Paleobiogeography ==
Chelydropsis likely represents a single, monotypic lineage, which arrived in Eurasia from North America during the late Eocene, with the earliest fossils being known from France. Oligocene fossils of this species are furthermore known from Germany and Kazakhstan. By the Miocene it is known throughout Europe and parts of Asia, with fossils being known not only from the aforementioned countries, but also Austria, Czechia, Spain, Ukraine, Poland, Moldova, Romania, and Turkey. The Pliocene record of this genus is far less extensive, but Chelydropsis is still widely distributed throughout Europe in this period, although it disappears by the Pleistocene, likely as a result of the cooling climate, possibly going extinct after 3 Ma. This might indicate that the genus was less tolerant to cold temperatures than modern snapping turtles, or that the cooling shaped key factors needed for its survival.
