= ShipGoo001 =

Microbial life-form

ShipGoo001 is a mixture of apparently newly-discovered forms of microbial life found upon a ship in the Great Lakes. It was discovered in 2024 as a slimy tar-like material on the research vessel Blue Heron. Preliminary studies indicate that there are two completely new species, one each of archaea and bacteria.

== Discovery ==
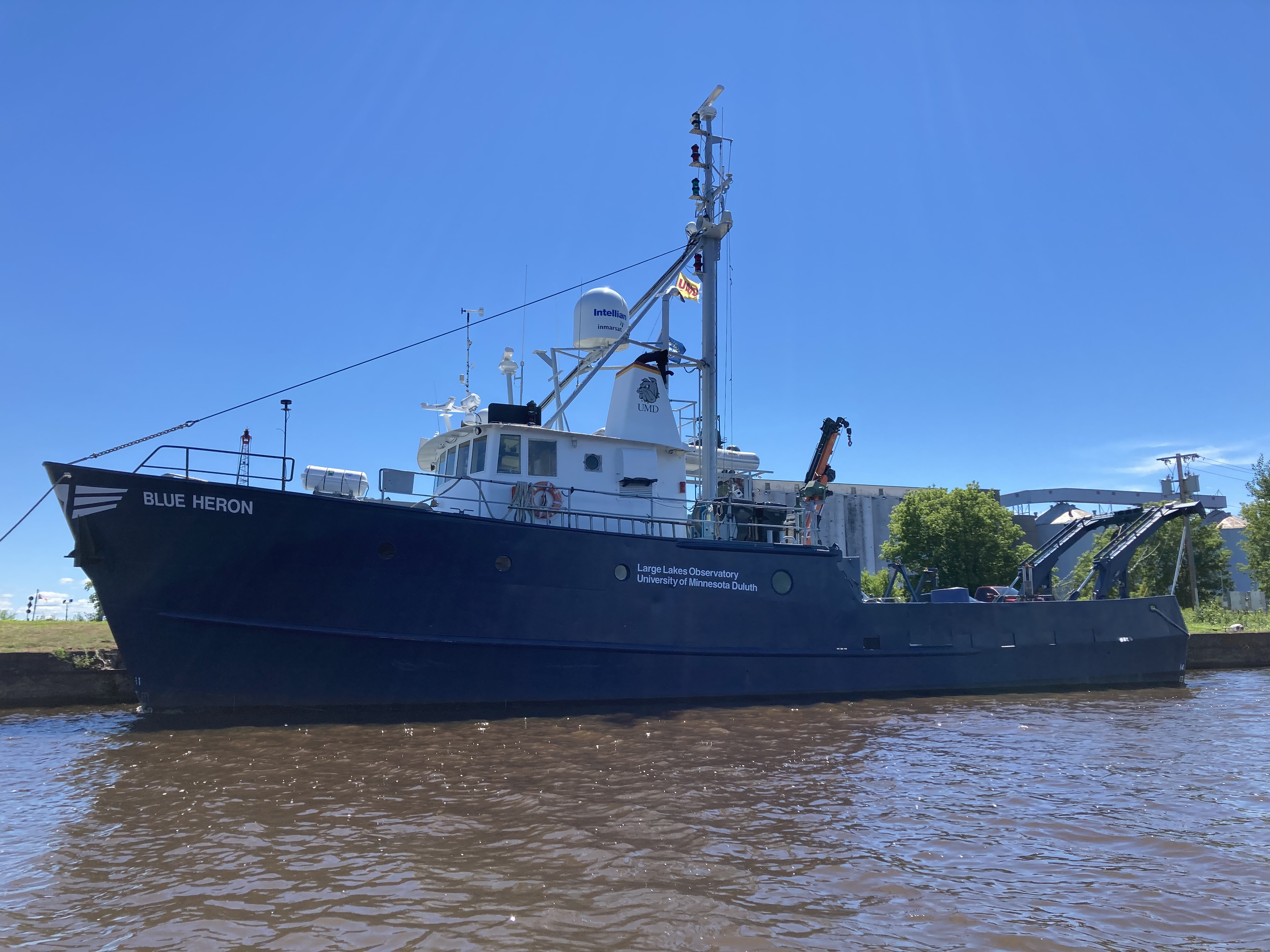
The RV Blue Heron, the ship upon which the goo was discovered

In summer 2024, the research vessel Blue Heron was studying algal blooms in Lake Erie, one of the Great Lakes spanning the Canada–United States border. It went to a shipyard at the Cuyahoga River in Cleveland to be inspected for what turned out to be damaged propeller shaft bearings. While examining the ship, the captain, Rual Lee, observed a black slimy substance oozing from near the rudder, and was concerned that a potential pollutant might have been coming out of the ship. He found that it did not leave a sheen on the surface of water, unlike hydrocarbons, and did not ignite when lit with a blowtorch, indicating that it was not flammable. Because the rudder is lubricated only by circulating lake water, it seemed unlikely that the material could have been some chemical leaking from the ship.

Personnel at the Large Lakes Observatory, which operates the research vessel, gave the material the temporary placeholder name "ShipGoo001". They took samples of the material to scientists at the University of Minnesota Duluth to determine what the material might be. The scientists found that the goo contained DNA. Through DNA sequencing and comparison against DNA databases, they were surprised to find that some of the DNA did not match any currently known organism, and appeared to be from entirely new species. The discovery was announced in 2025.

== Properties ==
Researchers found about twenty DNA sequences in the samples, only two of which were unique and potentially previously undescribed life forms. They consider it most likely that the unidentified species are single-cell organisms that had colonized the rudder housing of the ship, but there remains a possibility that, instead, they could be some sort of carbon-based material derived from substances floating in the lake water. Further analysis found that the principal new species is a type of archaea of an apparently newly-discovered order. A second sequence appears to be a bacterium of a new phylum. The previously known DNA sequences appear to be of microorganisms typically found in tar pits and oil wells.

Because the rudder housing is largely free of oxygen, the organisms are believed to be anaerobic. They may be part of a food web living in the housing, and it is possible that they contributed to corrosion of the rudder shaft. If so, further study could reveal ways to reduce corrosion. They show some signs of being methane producers, which could also have practical applications in biofuel production. Because the lake water is well-oxygenated, it is unclear whether the organisms could have come from the water; no evidence of the goo was observed in the previous maintenance of the ship in 2021. One possibility is that the organisms had been present but dormant in a lubricant previously applied to the rudder, and proliferated under the conditions of the rudder housing. Before becoming a research vessel, the Blue Heron had been a fishing boat, and the previous owners might have applied such a lubricant, although the current crew has not done so.

Although research vessels have previously found new forms of aquatic life, this is believed to be the first time that such a discovery has been made within the ship itself. According to Large Lakes Observatory director Catherine O'Reilly, "It was totally brand new to science". Lead scientist Cody Sheik said: "It's fun science. By calling it ship goo for now, it brings some joy to our science. We can find novelty wherever we look. Scientists don't often have time to be playful – we're focused and have projects to complete. Time and resources for exploratory work can be daunting. But this shows why it matters." The research team plans to publish their findings and determine official scientific names for the organisms.

== Reactions ==
News of the discovery, and of the whimsical placeholder name, led to comments on social media, including: "A mysterious living black goo...What could go wrong?" and "We don't have time for venom [sic] to run around Cleveland."
