= Macrocephalochelys =

Macrocephalochelys Temporal range: Pliocene

Scientific classification (disputed)
- Kingdom: Animalia
- Phylum: Chordata
- Class: Reptilia
- Order: Testudines
- Suborder: Cryptodira
- Family: Chelydridae
- Genus: †Macrocephalochelys; Piboplichko and Taraschchuk, 1960

Species
- †M. pontica

Extinct genus of turtles

Macrocephalochelys is an extinct genus of turtles in the family Chelydridae. It has an uncertain status, considered as either doubtful or synonymous with Chelydropsis. It was first described from a partial skull from the Pliocene found in Ukraine by Piboplichko and Taraschchuk in 1960. It was assigned to the family Chelydridae by R. L. Carroll in 1988 although it had been hypothesised to belong in Chelydridae by Chkhikvadze in 1971.
