= Planiplastron =

Planiplastron Temporal range: Oligocene

Scientific classification
- Kingdom: Animalia
- Phylum: Chordata
- Class: Reptilia
- Order: Testudines
- Suborder: Cryptodira
- Family: Chelydridae
- Genus: †Planiplastron; Chkhikvadze, 1971

Extinct genus of turtles

Planiplastron is an extinct genus of snapping turtle. It was first described by Chkhikvadze in 1971. It was assigned to the family Chelydridae by R. L. Carroll in 1988.
