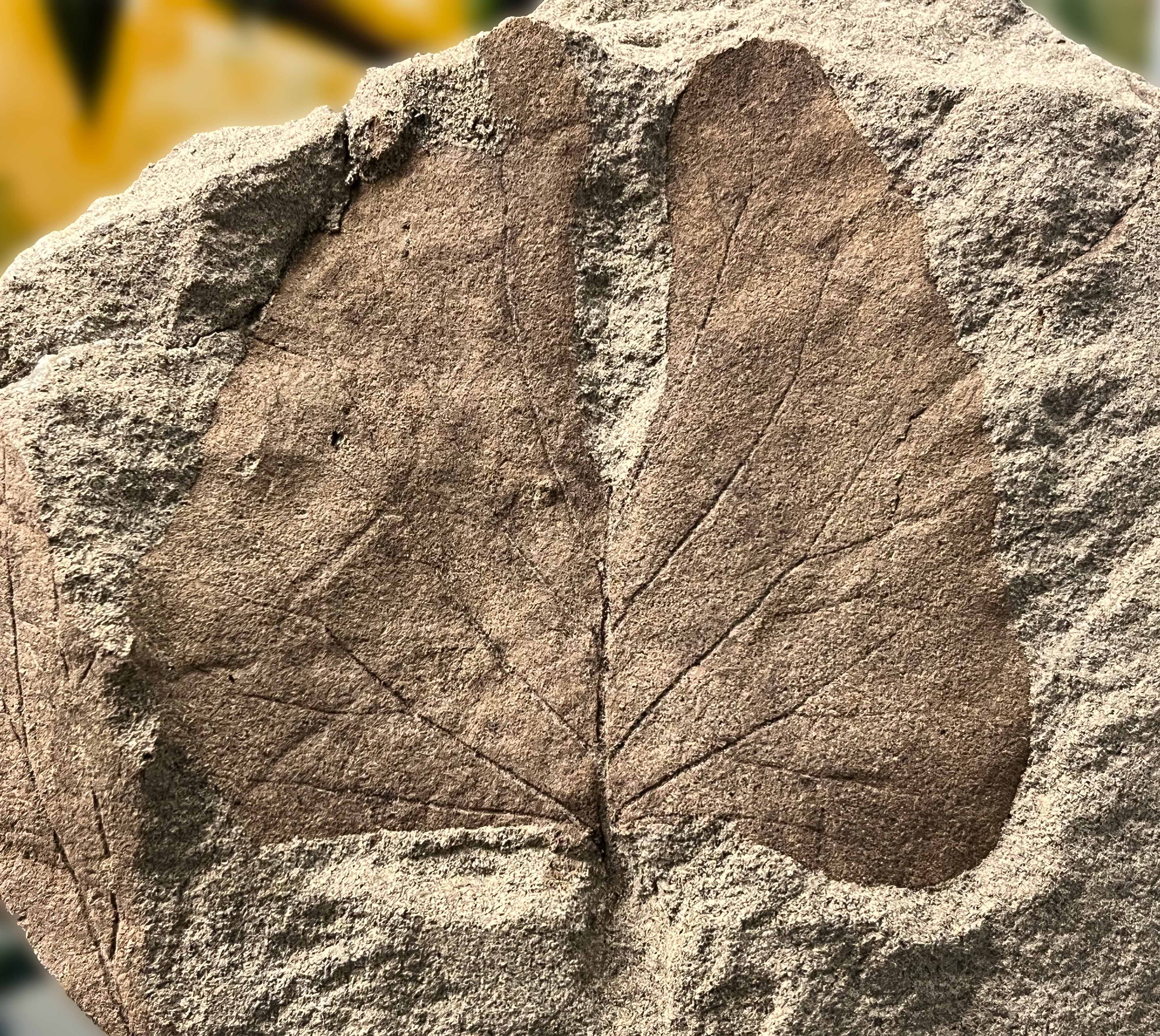

Scientific classification
- Kingdom: Plantae
- Clade: Tracheophytes
- Clade: Angiosperms
- Clade: Magnoliids
- Order: Magnoliales
- Family: Magnoliaceae
- Genus: †Liriodendrites; Johnson (1996)

Species
- †L. aeternus Alekseev, 2010; †L. bradacii Johnson, 1996 (type species); †L. laramiense Johnson, 1996 (Kirk, 1989); †L. occidentalis Alekseev, 2010; †L. sachalinensis Aleskeev, 2010

= Liriodendrites =

Liriodendrites Temporal range: Late Cretaceous–Paleocene

Extinct genus of flowering plants

Liriodendrites is an extinct genus of plants, known from fossil leaves. These have a forked apex (bifurcate), like those of extant species of Liriodendron. They have been interpreted as transitional between the leaves of the extinct genus Liriophyllum and Liriodendron. The genus has been placed in the family Magnoliaceae. Five species are known: L. aeternus, L. bradacii, L. laramiense, L. occidentalis and L. sachalinensis. It has been discovered in the United States (Hell Creek Formation), Egypt (Bahariya Formation) and Russia (Sakhalin and Siberia).
