= RV Blue Heron =

Research vessel serving on the Laurentian Great Lakes

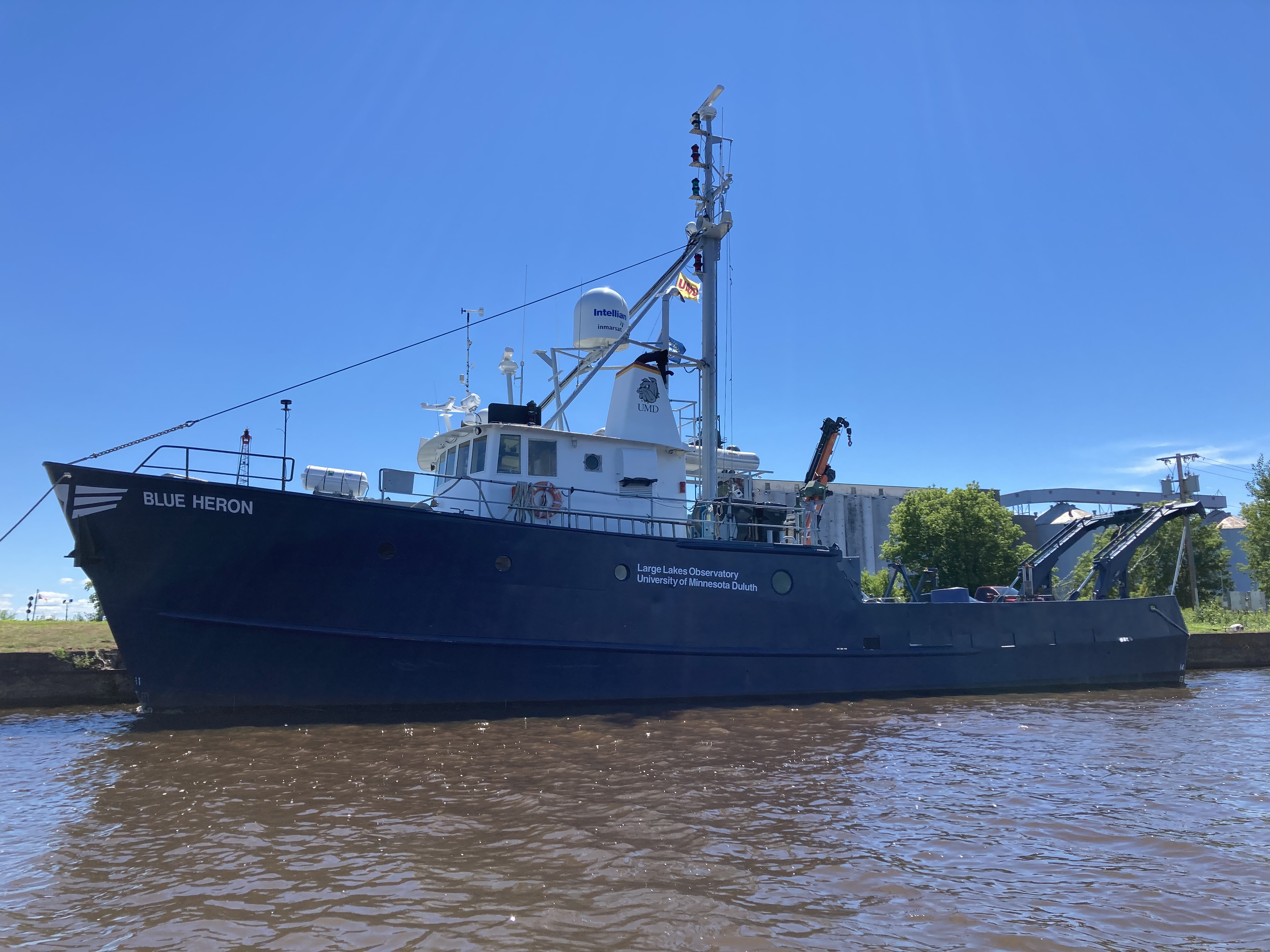
- The RV Blue Heron at Superior, Wisconsin

History
- Name: Blue Heron
- Namesake: Great blue heron
- Owner: University of Minnesota Duluth
- Operator: University of Minnesota Duluth/Large Lakes Observatory
- Port of registry: Duluth, Minnesota
- Launched: 1985
- Acquired: 1997
- Renamed: Fairtry: 1985–1997 Blue Heron: 1997–present
- Status: in active service

General characteristics
- Type: Research vessel
- Displacement: 278 long tons (282 t)
- Length: 86 ft 3 in (26.29 m)
- Beam: 23 ft 4 in (7.11 m)
- Draft: 12 ft (3.7 m)
- Decks: 3
- Installed power: 1 × Caterpillar 3508TA diesel
- Propulsion: 1 x stainless steel prop
- Speed: 10 knots (19 km/h; 12 mph) maximum
- Endurance: 21 days
- Crew: 5 crew, 6 scientists

RV Blue Heron is a research vessel serving on the Laurentian Great Lakes. She is owned by the University of Minnesota Duluth, and operated by the Large Lakes Observatory in partnership with the University-National Oceanographic Laboratory System. The Blue Heron is the largest research ship owned by a university operating on the Great Lakes, and the second-smallest UNOLS vessel by LOA.

== History ==
The Blue Heron was built in 1985 as a fishing vessel and christened Fairtry before being purchased by the University of Minnesota in 1997 and converted to a research vessel for deployment in 1998. The ship celebrated its 25th year of scientific service in 2023.

In September 2024 the crew discovered an unknown microorganism in a substance on the ship's rudder shaft while docked at the Great Lakes Shipyard in Cleveland, Ohio. Researchers gave the microorganism the placeholder name of "ShipGoo001".

== Activities ==
The Blue Heron conducts limnological research on the five Great Lakes throughout the ice-free season. Its capabilities include water and sediment sampling and analysis, sensor launching and retrieval, and radar/sonar scanning. In addition to its research capabilities, the ship also hosts public science outreach and education events in Duluth and other communities.
