= Emarginachelys =

Emarginachelys Temporal range: Maastrichtian

Scientific classification
- Domain: Eukaryota
- Kingdom: Animalia
- Phylum: Chordata
- Class: Reptilia
- Order: Testudines
- Suborder: Cryptodira
- Clade: Americhelydia
- Genus: †Emarginachelys; Whetstone, 1978
- Species: †E. cretacea

Binomial name
- †Emarginachelys cretacea Whetstone, 1978

Genus of turtles

Emarginachelys cretacea is a turtle belonging to the group Cryptodira, known from well preserved fossils from the Maastrichtian stage of the Late Cretaceous of Montana. Its exact phylogenetic position within Cryptodira is uncertain; different authors considered it to be either the earliest described chelydrid or a fossil relative of kinosternoids.
