= Protochelydra =

Protochelydra Temporal range: Late Paleocene–Early Eocene

Scientific classification
- Kingdom: Animalia
- Phylum: Chordata
- Class: Reptilia
- Order: Testudines
- Suborder: Cryptodira
- Family: Chelydridae
- Genus: †Protochelydra; Erickson 1973

Species
- †Protochelydra zangerli

Extinct genus of turtles

Protochelydra zangerli is an extinct species of turtle (chelydid) in the extinct genus Protochelydra of Chelydridae.
