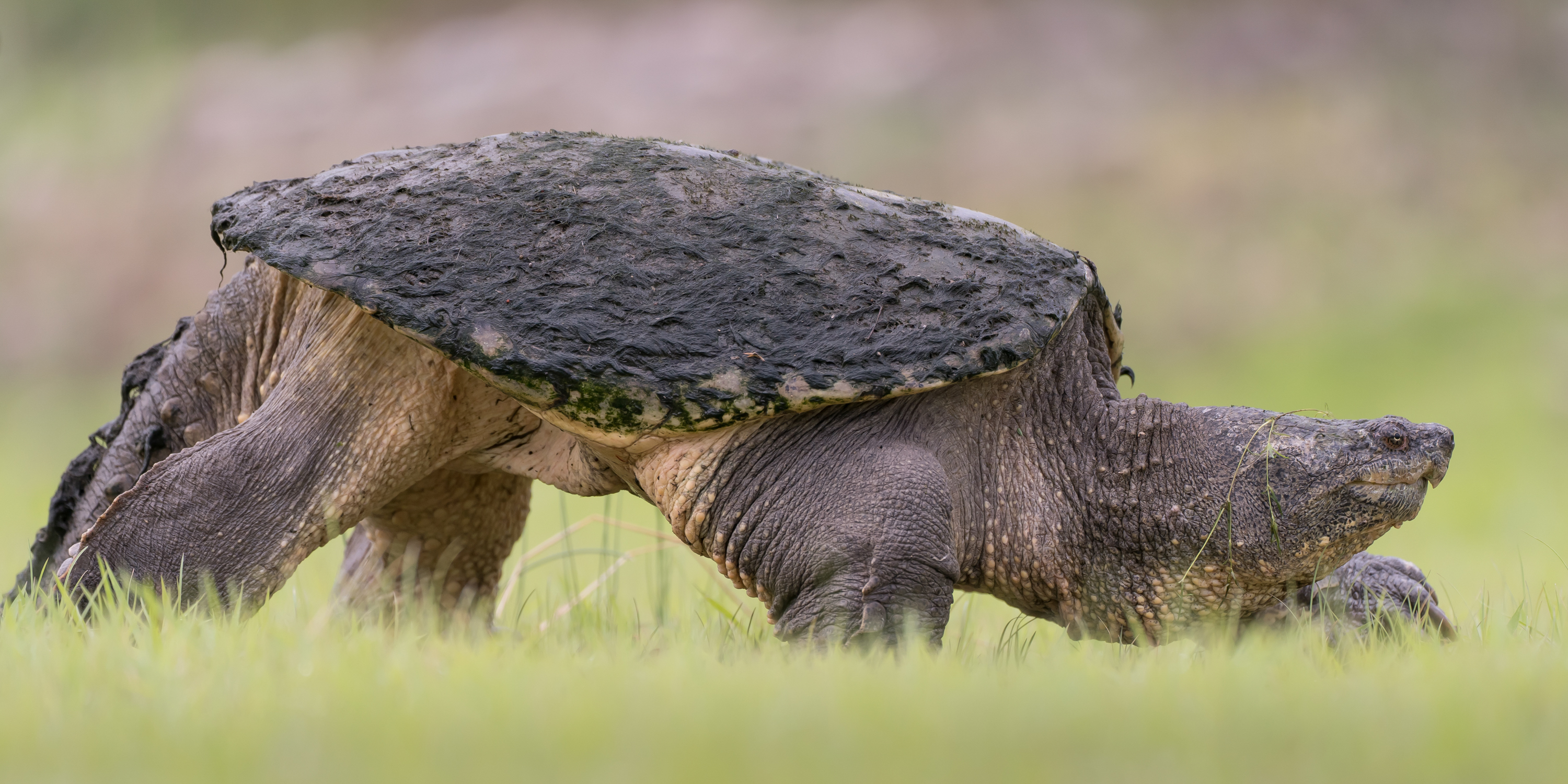
- Common snapping turtle (Chelydra serpentina)

Scientific classification
- Kingdom: Animalia
- Phylum: Chordata
- Class: Reptilia
- Order: Testudines
- Suborder: Cryptodira
- Clade: Chelydroidea
- Family: Chelydridae; Gray, 1831

Genera
- Chelydra; Macrochelys; †Acherontemys; †Chelydrops; †Chelydropsis; †Emarginachelys; †Macrocephalochelys; †Planiplastron; †Protochelydra

Synonyms
- Chelydrae Gray, 1831:4; Chelydridae Swainson, 1839:113; Chelydradae Gray, 1869:178

= Chelydridae =

Chelydrids Temporal range: 70.6–0 Ma Late Cretaceous to Recent

Family of turtles

Chelydridae is a family of turtles that has seven extinct and two extant genera. The extant genera are the snapping turtles, Chelydra and Macrochelys. Both are endemic to the Western Hemisphere. The extinct genera are Acherontemys, Chelydrops, Chelydropsis, Emarginachelys, Macrocephalochelys, Planiplastron, and Protochelydra.

== Fossil history ==
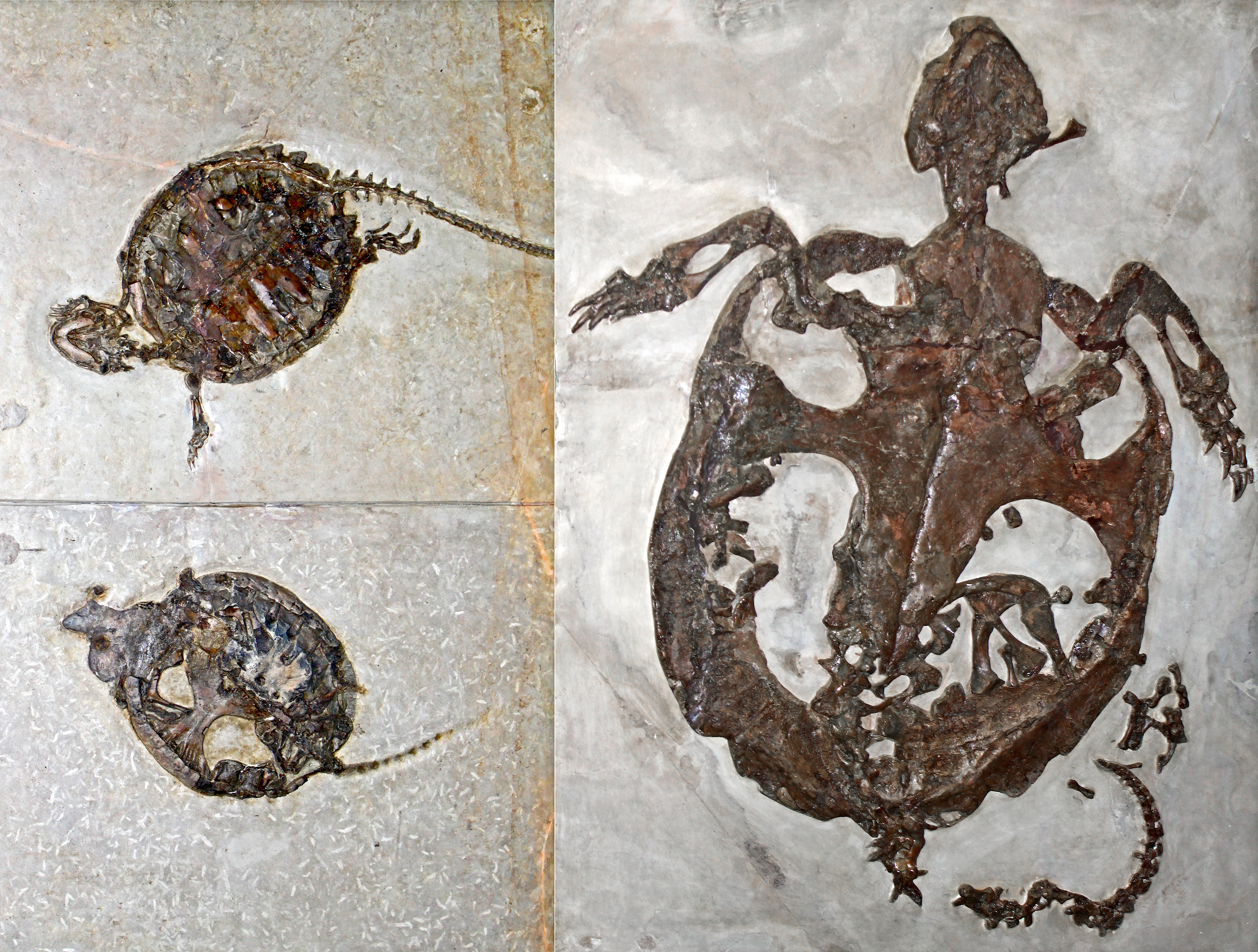
Chelydropsis murchisoni fossil remains (left: juvenile; right: adult)

The Chelydridae have a long fossil history, with extinct species reported from North America and all over Asia and Europe, far outside their present range. The earliest described chelydrid is Emarginachelys cretacea, known from well-preserved fossils from the Maastrichtian stage of the Late Cretaceous of Montana. Another well-preserved fossil chelydrid is the Late Paleocene Protochelydra zangerli from North Dakota. The carapace of P. zangerli is higher-domed than that of the recent Chelydra, a trait conjectured to be associated with the coexistence of large, turtle-eating crocodilians. Another genus, Chelydropsis, contains several well-known Eurasian chelydrid species that existed from the Oligocene to the Pliocene. In South America, chelydrids (C. acutirostris) only occupy the northwestern corner of the continent, reflecting their recent arrival from Central America as part of the Great American Interchange.

== Gallery ==
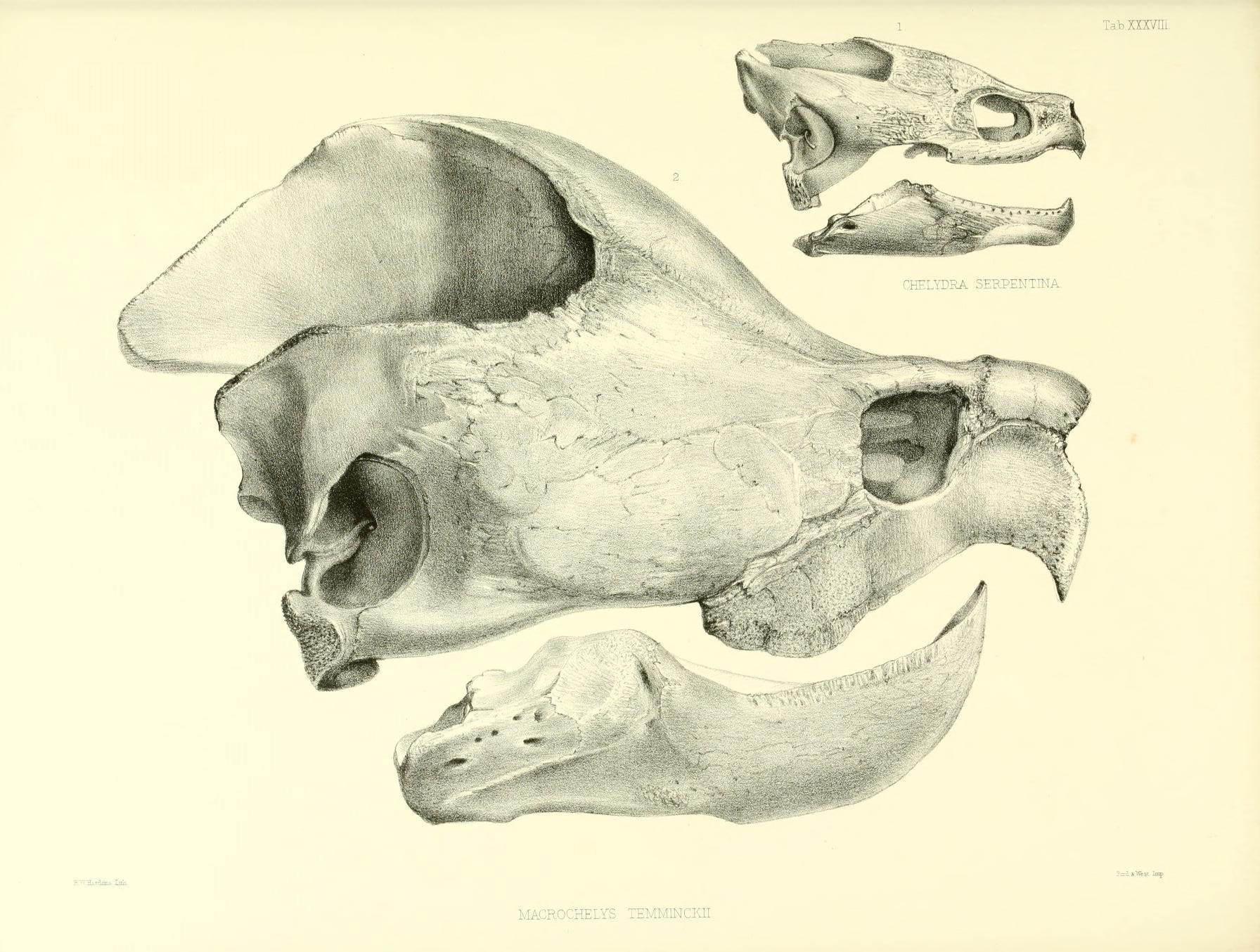
Skulls of alligator snapping turtle (bottom) and common snapping turtle (top)

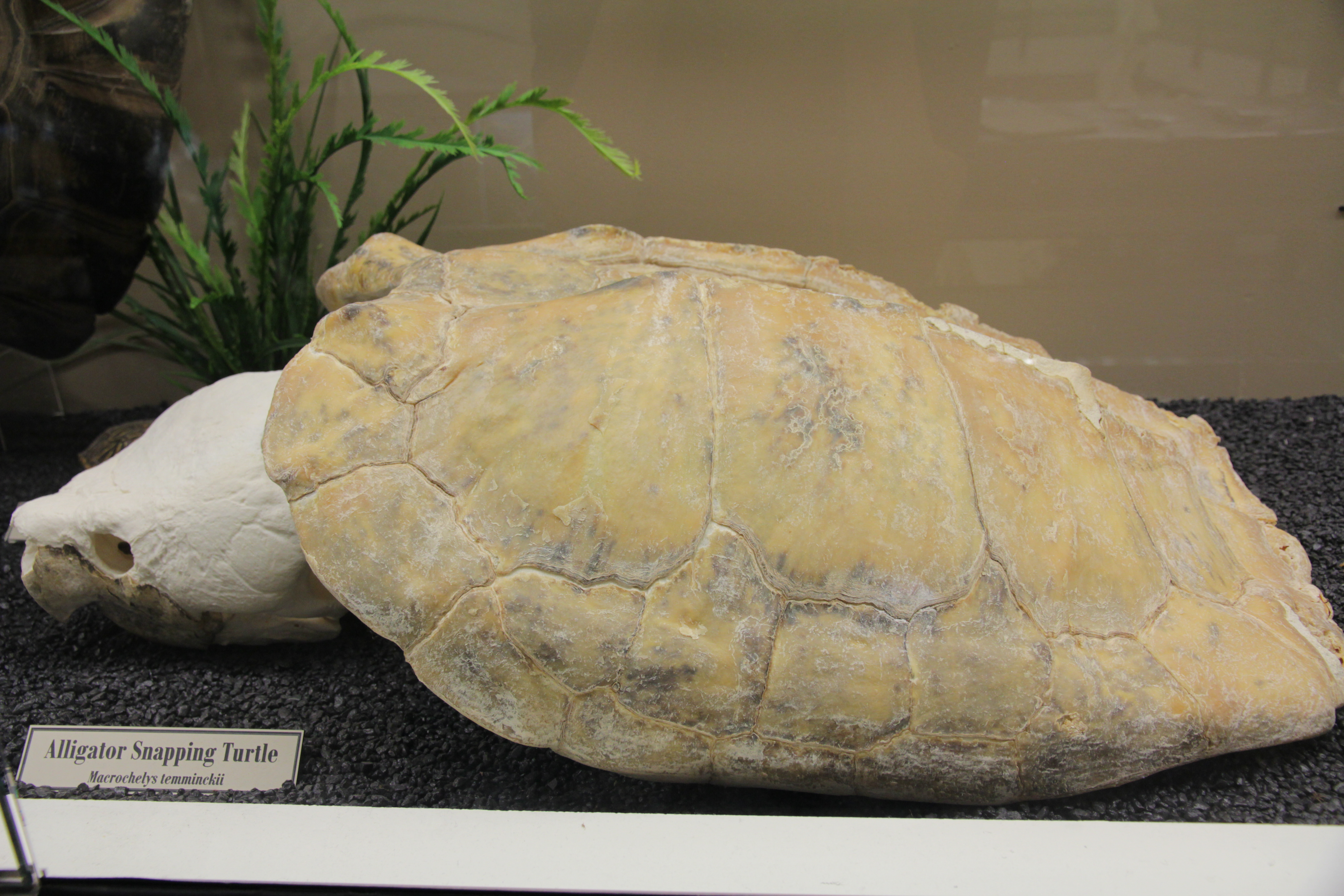
Skeleton of alligator snapping turtle at the Museum of Osteology

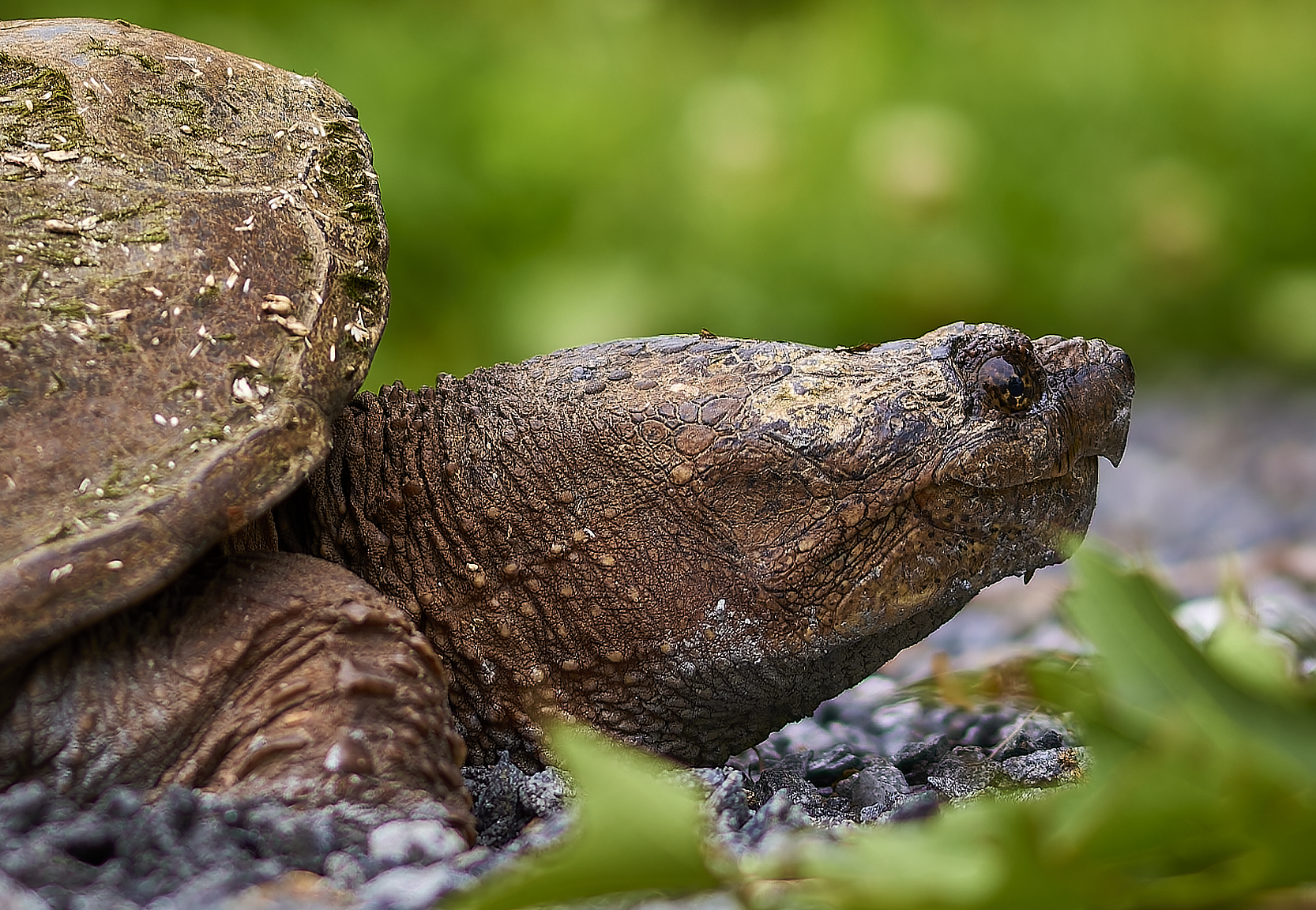
Female common snapping turtle laying eggs (not visible), Pleasant Valley Wildlife Sanctuary, Lenox, Massachusetts

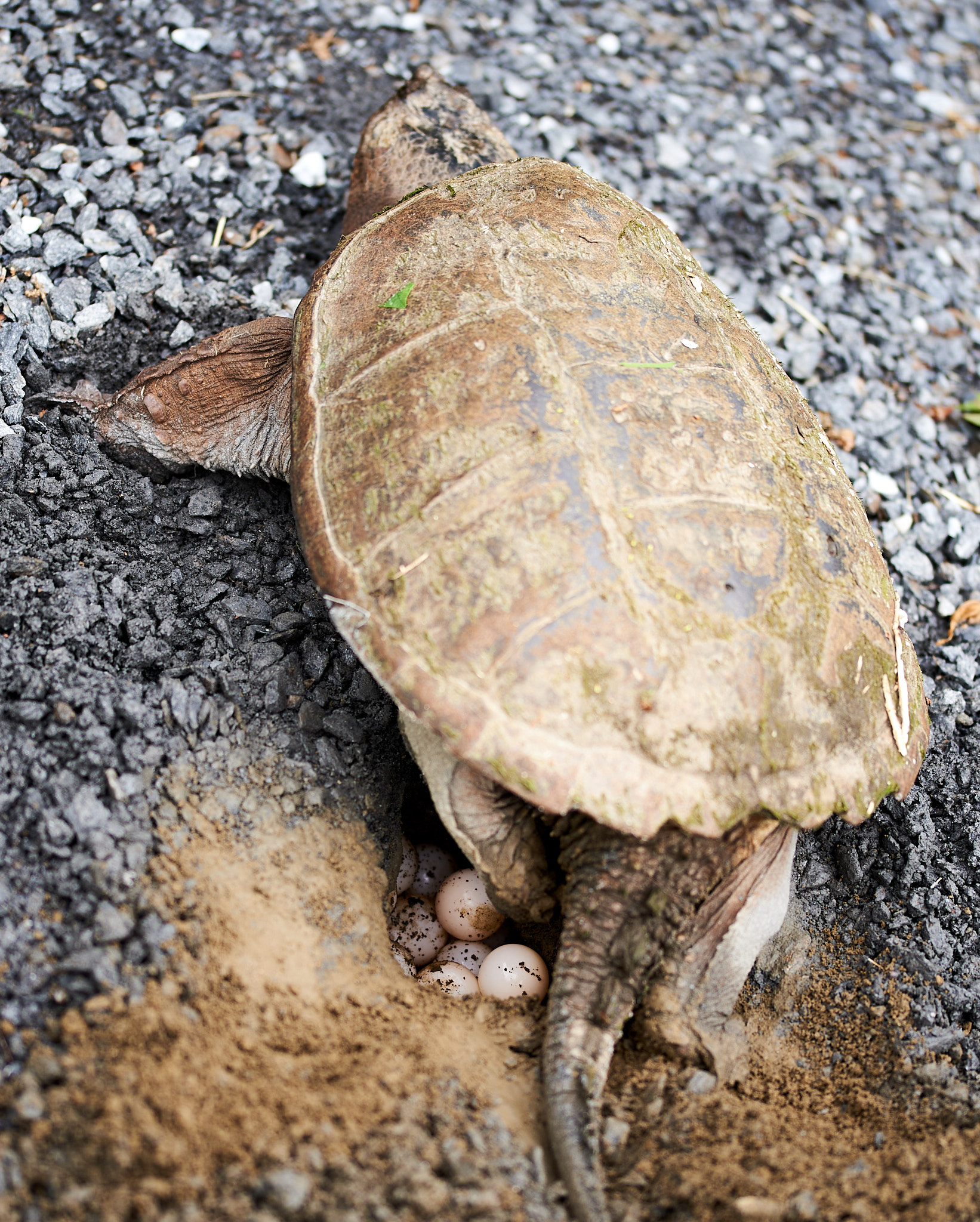
Female common snapper laying eggs
