= Paleobiota of the Hell Creek Formation =

Fossil flora and fauna of North American site

This is an overview of the fossil flora and fauna of the Maastrichtian-Danian Hell Creek Formation.

== Invertebrates ==
=== Insects ===
Insects from the groups Diptera, Zygoptera, and possibly Hemiphlebiidae have been unearthed in Hell Creek in amber. Fossils found in the Hell Creek Formation and the Fort Union Formation of these insects went extinct during the K-T Event.

Color key: Taxon / Reclassified taxon / Taxon falsely reported as present / Dubious taxon or junior synonym / Ichnotaxon / Ootaxon / Morphotaxon

Notes
Uncertain or tentative taxa are in small text
~~crossed out~~ taxa are discredited.

Genus	Species	Location	Stratigraphic position	Material	Notes	Images
Cephaloleichnites	Cephaloleichnites strongi				Possible hispine beetle herbivory on Zingiberopsis attenuta	
?Hemiphlebiidae indet.	Indeterminate				Possible Hemiphlebiid damselflies	
Brachycera indet.	Indeterminate				Undescribed brachyceran flies	
Nematocera indet.	Indeterminate				Undescribed nematoceran flies	
Aeschnidiidae indet.	Indeterminate				Indeterminate aeschnidiid dragonflies	

=== Molluscs ===
Genus	Species	Location	Stratigraphic position	Material	Notes	Images
Plesielliptio	P. postbiplicatus				Freshwater Unionid river mussels	
Plesielliptio	P. gibbosoides				Freshwater Unionid river mussels	
Plesielliptio	P. whitfieldi				Freshwater Unionid river mussels	
Rhabdotophorus	R. aldrichi				Freshwater mussel of family Unionidae.	
Pleurobema	P. cryptorhynchus				Freshwater mussel of family Unionidae.	
Plethobasus	P. aesopiformis				Freshwater mussel of family Unionidae.	
Plethobasus	P. biesopoides					
Quadrula	Q. cylindricoides				Freshwater mussel of family Unionidae.	
Proparreysia	P. verrucosiformis				Freshwater mussel of family Unionidae.	
Proparreysia	P. holmesiana					
Proparreysia	P. barnumi					
Proparreysia	P. percorrugata					
Proparreysia	P. pyramidatoides					
Proparreysia	P. letsoni					
Proparreysia	P. retusoides					
Proparreysia	P. corbiculoides					
Proparreysia	P. paucinodosa					
?Obovaria	?O. pyramidella					
Corbicula	C. cf. subelliptica					
Corbicula	C. sp	South Dakota			From a marine facies ("tongue"). Modern members of the genus live in fresh water	
Sphaerium	S. beckmani				"Pill clam". "Nut clam". "Fingernail clam". "Pea clam". Family Sphaeriidae.	
Pleiodon	Indeterminate					
Campeloma	C. sp				Freshwater snail	
Anomia	A. gryphorhyncha				Bivalve. Family Anomiidae. From a marine facies ("tongue") in South Dakota.	
Crassostrea	C. subtrigonalis				Oyster. Family Ostreidae. Collected from a marine facies ("tongue") in South Dakota.	
Granocardium	G. sp				Bivalve. Family Cardiidae (cockle). Collected from a marine facies ("tongue") in South Dakota.	
?Hiatella	?H. sp				Bivalve. Present members of this genus are rock borers. Collected from a marine facies ("tongue") in South Dakota.	
Leptosolen	indeterminate				Bivalve. Family Cultellidae. Collected from a marine facies ("tongue") in South Dakota.	
Sphenodiscus	S. lenticularis				Ammonite. From a marine facies ("tongue") in South Dakota.	
Discoscaphites	D. rossi				Microconch of an ammonite. From a marine facies ("tongue") in South Dakota.	
Scaphitidae	indeterminate				Ammonite. From a marine facies ("tongue") in South Dakota. Other attributes: specimen has hooks on its shell.	

== Amphibians ==
Color key: Taxon / Reclassified taxon / Taxon falsely reported as present / Dubious taxon or junior synonym / Ichnotaxon / Ootaxon / Morphotaxon

Notes
Uncertain or tentative taxa are in small text
~~crossed out~~ taxa are discredited.

Genus	Species	Location	Stratigraphic position	Material	Notes	Images
Anura indet.	indeterminate	North Dakota; South Dakota	Middle to upper Hell Creek Formation	3 unassigned specimens	Anura indet. consists of material not currently assigned to any genus of frog.	
Barbourula	Indeterminate	Montana				
Caudata indet.	indeterminate	North Dakota; South Dakota	Lower to uppermost Hell Creek Formation	149 unassigned specimens	Material of Caudata indet. is not currently assigned to any genus.	
Eopelobates	Indeterminate	Montana				
Habrosaurus	H. dilatus	Montana; North Dakota; South Dakota	Middle to upper Hell Creek Formation	6 specimens	Habrosaurus is a sirenid amphibian.	
Lisserpeton	L. bairdi	Montana				
Opisthotriton	O. kayi	Montana; North Dakota; South Dakota	Lower to upper Hell Creek Formation	22 specimens	Opisthotriton is classified as a Batrachosauroididae.	
Paranecturus	P. garbanii	Montana			A member of Proteidae.	
Proamphiuma	P. cretacica	Montana				
Prodesmodon	P. copei	Montana				
Scapherpeton	S. tectum	Montana; North Dakota; South Dakota	Lower to upper Hell Creek Formation	144 specimens	Scapherpeton is a scapherpetonid that is very common in the Hell Creek Formation.	
Scotiophryne	S. pustulosa	Montana			A small frog	

== Fish ==
=== Bony fish ===
Bony fishes
Genus	Species	Location	Stratigraphic position	Material	Notes	Images
Acipenser	A. amnisinferos	North Dakota (Tanis)			A sturgeon	
Acipenser	A. eruciferus	Montana			A sturgeon	
Acipenser	A. praeparatorum	North Dakota (Tanis)			A sturgeon	
Acipenser	A. cf. A. amnisinferos	North Dakota (Tanis)			A sturgeon	
Acipenser	cf. A. sp.	North Dakota; South Dakota	Lower to upper Hell Creek Formation	18 specimens are tentatively assigned to Acipenser sp.	Acipenser sp. is tentatively referred to the genus.	
Acronichthys	A. sp.	Montana		Vertebral centra	An early otophysan. Originally treated as Otophysi indet.	
Anchiacipenser	A. acanthaspis	Montana			A sturgeon, originally considered as indeterminate material	
?Arotus	A. hieroglyphus	Montana			A holostean of uncertain affinities. Presence in this formation not certain, and likely uncommon or highly restricted if it is.	
Belonostomus	B. longirostris	Montana; North Dakota; South Dakota	Lower to upper Hell Creek Formation	28 specimens	A long-snouted slender fish classified as an aspidorhynchid.	
Coriops	C. amnicolus	Montana				
Cyclurus	C. fragosus	Montana; North Dakota; South Dakota			A small amiid fish (ubiquitous). Previously known as Amia fragosa or Kindleia fragosa. 2610 specimens have been assigned to Kindleia, making it an extremely common genus.	Cyclurus kehreri from Messel Pit, species within same genus as C. fragosus
"Lepisosteus"	"L. occidentalis"	Montana; North Dakota; South Dakota	Lower to uppermost Hell Creek Formation	938 specimens are assigned to Lepidosteus	A lepidosteid that is very common in the Hell Creek Formation. Nomen dubium.	
Melvius	M. thomasi	North Dakota; South Dakota	Lower to upper Hell Creek Formation	6 specimens are assigned to Melvius	A large amiid fish.	
Phyllodus	P. paulkatoi				Fish with columnar teeth	
Palaeolabrus	P. montanensis	Montana				
Paleopsephurus	P. wilsoni	Montana			A paddlefish	
Paralbula	P. casei	Montana				
Parapsephurus	P. willybemisi	North Dakota (Tanis)			A paddlefish	
Platacodon	P. nanus	Montana			Small teleost fish	
Protamia	Indeterminate	Montana				
Pachyrhizodontoidei indet.	Indeterminate				Fish	
Polyodontidae indet.	Indeterminate	Montana			Paddlefish	
Protoscaphirhynchus	P. squamosus	Montana			A sturgeon	
Pugiopsephurus	P. inundatus	North Dakota (Tanis)			A paddlefish	

=== Cartilaginous fish ===
Chondrichthyes reported from the Hell Creek Formation
Genus	Species	Location	Stratigraphic position	Material	Notes	Images
Chiloscyllium	C. sp.	Montana			A member of Hemiscylliidae.	
Galagadon	G. nordquistae	South Dakota		Isolated teeth	A carpet shark	
Lonchidion	L. selachos	Montana; North Dakota; South Dakota	Lower to upper Hell Creek Formation	40 specimens	A genus of prehistoric sharks in the family Hybodontidae. It makes up 0.4% of the remains of the vertebrates of the Hell Creek Formation.	
Myledaphus	M. pustulosus	Montana; North Dakota; South Dakota	Lower to upper Hell Creek Formation.	1677 specimens previously assigned to M. bipartitus.	Is an anacoracid batoid rajiform related to guitarfishes. Described on the basis of teeth formerly assigned to the species M. bipartitus. The material assigned to Myledaphus bipartitus and makes up 16.5% of the vertebrate remains.	
Protoginglymostoma	P. estesi	Montana			A member of Ginglymostomatidae. Formerly assigned to the genus Brachaelurus.	
Restesia	R. americana	Montana; North Dakota; South Dakota	Middle Hell Creek Formation	5 specimens previously assigned to Squatirhina	A wobbegong-like shark. Formerly assigned to Squatirhina. The remains consist of 0.05% of the vertebrates. Also known from the Lance Formation.	
Carcharhinidae indet.	Indeterminate	South Dakota		An isolated tooth.		
Scapanorhynchus	S.sp.	North Dakota			A Goblin shark relative that lived in shallow water to possibly even brackish and freshwater.	
Carcharias	C.sp	North Dakota			A sand tiger shark	

== Dinosaurs ==
A paleo-population study is one of the most difficult of analyses to conduct in field paleontology. Here is the most recent estimate of the proportions of the eight most common dinosaurian families in the Hell Creek Formation, based on detailed field studies by White, Fastovsky and Sheehan.

- Ceratopsidae 61%
- Hadrosauridae 23%
- Ornithomimidae 5%
- Tyrannosauridae 4%
- Hypsilophodontidae 3%
- Dromaeosauridae 2%
- Pachycephalosauridae 1%
- Ankylosauridae 1%
- Troodontidae 1% (represented only by teeth)

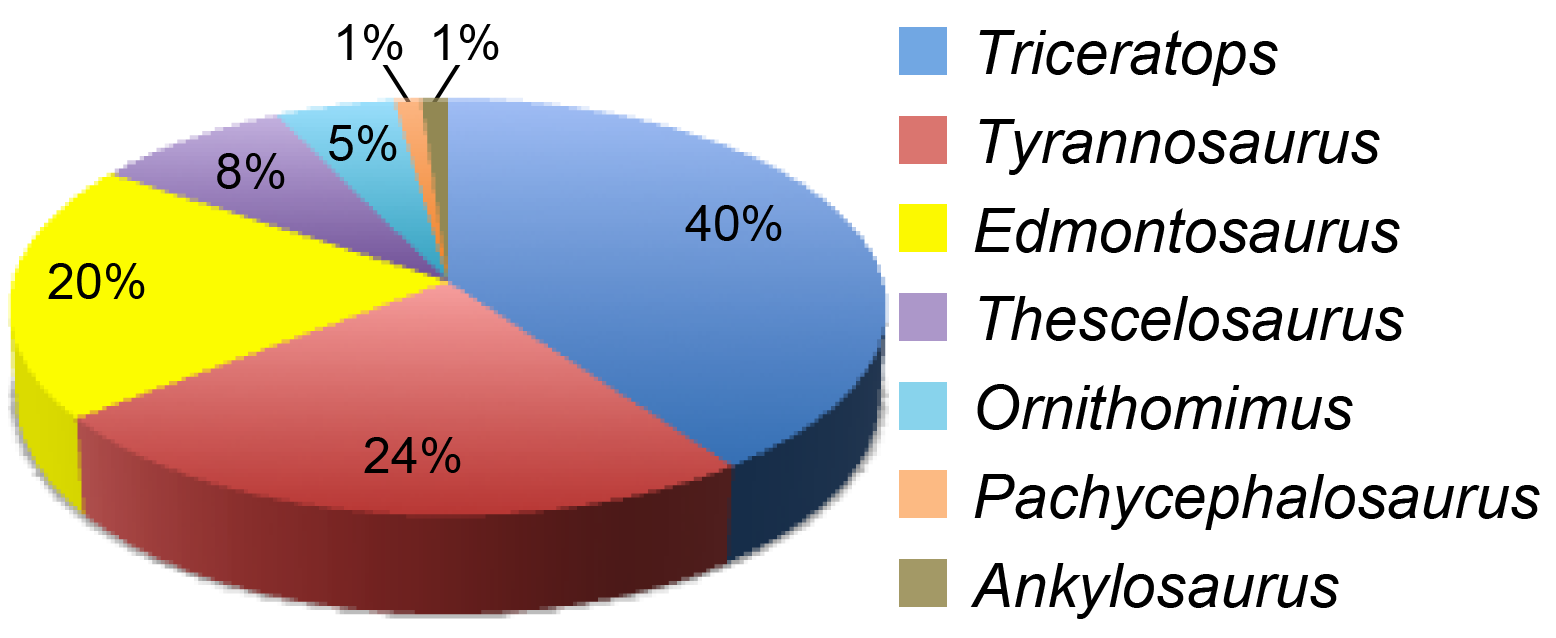
Pie chart of the time averaged census for large-bodied dinosaurs from the entire Hell Creek Formation in the study area.

Outcrops sampled by the Hell Creek Project were divided into three sections: lower, middle and upper slices. The top and bottom sections were the focus of the PLoS One report, and within each portion many remains of Triceratops, Edmontosaurus, and Tyrannosaurus were found. Triceratops was the most common in each section, but, surprisingly, Tyrannosaurus was just as common, if not slightly more common, than the hadrosaur Edmontosaurus. In the upper Hell Creek section, for example, the census included twenty two Triceratops, five Tyrannosaurus, and five Edmontosaurus.

The dinosaurs Thescelosaurus, Ornithomimus, Pachycephalosaurus and Ankylosaurus were also included in the breakdown, but were relatively rare. Other dinosaurs, such as Sphaerotholus, Denversaurus, Torosaurus, Struthiomimus, Acheroraptor, Dakotaraptor, Pectinodon, Richardoestesia, Paronychodon, Anzu, Leptorhynchos and Troodon (more likely Pectinodon), were reported as being rare and are not included in the breakdown.

The dinosaur collections made over the past decade during the Hell Creek Project yielded new information from an improved genus-level collecting schema and robust data set that revealed relative dinosaur abundances that were unexpected, and ontogenetic age classes previously considered rare. We recognize a much higher percentage of Tyrannosaurus than previous surveys. Tyrannosaurus equals Edmontosaurus in U3 and in L3 comprises a greater percentage of the large dinosaur fauna as the second-most abundant taxon after Triceratops, followed by Edmontosaurus. This is surprisingly consistent in (1) the two major lag deposits (MOR loc. HC-530 and HC-312) in the Apex sandstone and Jen-rex sand where individual bones were counted and (2) in two thirds of the formation reflected in L3 and U3 records of dinosaur skeletons only.

Triceratops is by far the most common dinosaur at 40% (n = 72), Tyrannosaurus is second at 24% (n = 44), Edmontosaurus is third at 20% (n = 36), followed by Thescelosaurus at 8% (n = 15), Ornithomimus at 5% (n = 9), and Pachycephalosaurus and Ankylosaurus both at 1% (n = 2) are relatively rare.

Fossil footprints of dinosaurs from the Hell Creek Formation are very rare. As of 2017, there is only one find of a possible Tyrannosaurus rex footprint, dating from 2007 and described a year later. A trackway made by mid-sized theropod, possibly a small tyrannosaurid individual, was discovered in South Dakota in 1997, and in 2014 these footprints were named Wakinyantanka styxi.

=== Ornithischians ===
==== Ankylosaurs ====
Indeterminate nodosaur remains have been unearthed in the Hell Creek Formation and other nearby areas.

Ankylosauria reported from the Hell Creek Formation
Genus	Species	State	Stratigraphic position	Material	Notes	Images
Ankylosaurus	A. magniventris	Montana	Lower to upper	A partial skull, teeth, cervical vertebrae, dorsal vertebrae, caudal vertebrae, right scapulocoracoid, otic capsule, maxilla fragment, right jugal, left jugal and quadratojugal, sacral centra, additional fragments of the cervical half rings and a partial tail club handle.	An ankylosaur. Also found in the Lance, Frenchman, Ferris and Scollard Formations.	
Denversaurus	D. schlessmani	South Dakota	Lower	A complete skull without the lower jaw and associated plates (DMNH 468)	A nodosaurid ankylosaur whose remains have been also found in the Lance Formation	

==== Pachycephalosaurs ====
An undescribed and unnamed pachycephalosaur is present in North Dakota. Pachycephalosaur remains have been unearthed in Montana as in the case of Platytholus and the now invalid genus Stenotholus kohleri, the latter of which is now considered a junior synonym of Stygimoloch. Dracorex hogwartsia is agreed by paleontologists to be an ontogimorph of either Pachycephalosaurus or Stygimoloch, while the synonymy of Stygimoloch spinifer with Pachycephalosaurus wyomingensis remains uncertain due to difference in stratigraphic level.

Pachycephalosaurs reported from the Hell Creek Formation
Genus	Species	State	Stratigraphic position	Material	Notes	Images
Pachycephalosaurus	P. wyomingensis	Montana; South Dakota	Lower		A pachycephalosaur. Also found in the Lance Formation.	
Platytholus	P. clemensi	Montana	Lower	A partial skull	A medium-sized pachycephalosaurine closely related to Acrotholus and Prenocephale	
Sphaerotholus	S. buchholtzae	Montana	Upper	"Skull material."	A pachycephalosaur whose remains have also been found in the Frenchman Formation. Genus also known from the Kirtland Formation, Dinosaur Park Formation and the Horseshoe Canyon Formation.	
Sphaerotholus	S. triregnum	Montana	Lower to middle? or upper	A left squamosal.	A pachycephalosaur distinguished from S. buchholtzae by its more ornamented squamosal.	
Stygimoloch	S. spinifer	Montana; South Dakota; North Dakota	Upper		A pachycephalosaur, possibly synonymous with Pachycephalosaurus. Also found in the Ferris Formation and the Lance Formation.	

==== Ceratopsians ====
Indeterminate ceratopsid teeth and some identifiable bones from Triceratops can be extremely common. 8.31% of all vertebrate remains from the Hell Creek Formation are unassigned ceratopsids, as well as dubious ceratopsians like Ugrosaurus olsoni. In 2012, a new unidentified species of chasmosaur ceratopsian with noticeable differences from Triceratops was unearthed in South Dakota by a fossil hunter named John Carter.

Color key: Taxon / Reclassified taxon / Taxon falsely reported as present / Dubious taxon or junior synonym / Ichnotaxon / Ootaxon / Morphotaxon

Notes
Uncertain or tentative taxa are in small text
~~crossed out~~ taxa are discredited.

Ceratopsians reported from the Hell Creek Formation
Genus	Species	Synonyms	State	Stratigraphic position	Material	Notes	Images
Leptoceratops	L. gracilis		Montana	Lower Hell Creek Formation		A small primitive-looking ceratopsian. Fossils have also been found in the Lance Formation in Wyoming.	
Tatankaceratops	T. sacrisonorum		South Dakota	Upper Hell Creek Formation		A controversial ceratopsian possibly synonymous with Triceratops	
Torosaurus	T. latus		Montana; North Dakota; South Dakota	Lower to upper Hell Creek Formation		A ceratopsian that was once proposed to be synonymous with Triceratops, but is now regarded as a valid and distinct ceratopsian. A rare ceratopsid. Fossils have been in the Lance Formation, Javelina Formation, North Horn Formation, Laramie Formation, El Picacho Formation, Frenchman Formation and Scollard Formation.	
Triceratops	T. horridus	T. serratus; Ugrosaurus olsoni	Montana; North Dakota; Wyoming; South Dakota	Lowermost to the middle Hell Creek Formation	Four specimens are assigned to Triceratops horridus from the Hell Creek Formation. Isolated, shed ceratopsid teeth are incredibly common in the Hell Creek and Lance Formations, being by most collectors, with some being nothing more than worn down fragments up to superb teeth containing complete, preserved roots. Because the teeth of different ceratopsians are so similar to one another, its hard to differentiate between genera/species, but based on the abundance of identifiable bones belonging to Triceratops in Lancian-aged North American formations, especially the Hell Creek, isolated ceratopsid teeth from the lower and middle Hell Creek Formation have a high likelihood of originating from T. horridus.	A ceratopsian. Also found in the Evanston, Frenchman, Lance, Laramie, and Scollard Formations.	
Triceratops	T. prorsus		Montana; South Dakota	Upper 1/3 of the Hell Creek Formation	Very common. Because the teeth of different ceratopsians are so similar to one another, its hard to differentiate between genera/species, but based on the abundance of identifiable bones belonging to Triceratops in Lancian-aged North American formations, especially the Hell Creek, isolated ceratopsid teeth from the upper 1/3 of the Hell Creek Formation have a high likelihood of originating from T. prorsus.	Also found in the Frenchman and Lance Formations.	

==== Ornithopods and relatives ====
Indeterminate hadrosaurid remains are very common in the Hell Creek Formation. Fossils of indeterminate lambeosaurines are informally reported from the Hell Creek Formation, specifically in South Dakota and Montana.

Ornithopods and Thescelosaurs reported from the Hell Creek Formation
Genus	Species	Synonyms	State	Stratigraphic position	Material	Notes	Images
Edmontosaurus	E. annectens	Anatosaurus annectens; Anatotitan copei	Montana; South Dakota; North Dakota(Mummy Fossil)	Lower to upper Hell Creek Formation	Very common.	A hadrosaur. Also found in the Denver, Frenchman, Lance, Laramie, and Scollard Formations. Hatchlings have also been unearthed.	
Thescelosaurus	T. garbanii	Bugenasaura garbanii	Montana; South Dakota				
Thescelosaurus	T. neglectus		Montana; North Dakota; South Dakota	Lower to upper Hell Creek Formation	50 specimens	A small thescelosaurine. Also found in the Frenchman, Lance, Laramie, and Scollard Formations. Two species are known from Hell Creek; T. neglectus and T. garbanii.	

=== Theropods ===
Theropod tracks have been found in South Dakota. A trackway from South Dakota, named Wakinyantanka, was made by a mid-sized theropod with three slender toes, possibly a small tyrannosauroid or oviraptorosaur. A second footprint that may have been made by a specimen of Tyrannosaurus was first reported in 2007 by British paleontologist Phil Manning, from the Hell Creek Formation of Montana. This second track measures 72 centimeters (28 in) long, shorter than the track described by Lockley and Hunt. Whether or not the track was made by Tyrannosaurus is unclear, though Tyrannosaurus is the only large theropod known to have existed in the Hell Creek Formation; albertosaurine remains have been reported but are misattributed Tyrannosaurus or Nanotyrannus. Theropod remains are very common in Hell Creek, some of which belong to indeterminate species on maniraptorans. Indeterminate and dubious tyrannosaur fossils are found here as in the case of Stygivenator.

==== Alvarezsaurs ====
Alvarezsaurs reported from the Hell Creek Formation
Genus	Species	Synonyms	State	Stratigraphic position	Material	Notes	Images
"Ornithomimus"	"O." minutus						
Trierarchuncus	T. prairiensis		Montana	Lower to upper		An alvarezsaur known from a partial post-cranial skeleton.	

==== Tyrannosauroids ====
Tyrannosauroids reported from the Hell Creek Formation
Genus	Species	Synonyms	State	Stratigraphic position	Material	Notes	Images
Tyrannosaurus	T. rex	Albertosaurus megagracilis; Aublysodon molnari; Dinotyrannus megagracilis	Montana; North Dakota; South Dakota	Lower to upper Hell Creek Formation.		A tyrannosaur, known from several specimens. Also found in the Denver, Frenchman, Hill Creek South, Javelina, Lance, Ferris, Livingston, McRae, North Horn, Scollard, Willow Creek Formation, and also found in Lomas Coloradas Formations. Isolated teeth in the Hell Creek are common enough to be dug commercially by collectors, but rare enough that they are often sold for very high prices with fragmentary teeth usually beginning at least in the hundreds of USD, and complete teeth in the thousands of USD. Perhaps the best known iconic dinosaur. Footprints attributed to this taxa are some 0.9–1 metre (3.0–3.3 ft) in length.	
Nanotyrannus	N. lancensis	Gorgosaurus lancensis; Deinodon lancensis; Aublysodon lancensis; Albertosaurus lancensis; Tyrannosaurus lancensis; Aublysodon molnaris?; Aublysodon molnari?; Stygivenator molnari?	Montana	Lower Hell Creek Formation	The holotype, CMNH 7541, as well as referred specimens NCSM 40000 and KUVP 156375 are known.	A genus long regarded as a synonym of Tyrannosaurus. Now determined to be a distinct genus. Known from multiple specimens including a 98% complete adult skeleton preserved in the Dueling Dinosaurs fossil.	
Nanotyrannus	N. lethaeus		Montana	Possibly Middle to upper Hell Creek	known from the Holotype BMRP 2002.4.1, commonly referred to as "Jane"	A species known from a nearly complete skull and postcranial material including the hindlimbs pectoral girdle, and vertebrae.	

==== Ornithomimosaurs ====
Ornithomimid remains are not uncommon in the Hell Creek Formation, and are known from both the lower and upper parts of the formation. Fifteen specimens from the Hell Creek Formation are undetermined ornithomimids.

Color key: Taxon / Reclassified taxon / Taxon falsely reported as present / Dubious taxon or junior synonym / Ichnotaxon / Ootaxon / Morphotaxon

Notes
Uncertain or tentative taxa are in small text
~~crossed out~~ taxa are discredited.

Ornithomimids reported from the Hell Creek Formation
Genus	Species	State	Stratigraphic position	Material	Notes	Images
"Orcomimus"	unnamed	South Dakota		One partial skeleton.	An ornithomimid; nomen nudum.	
Struthiomimus	S. sedens	Montana; North Dakota		AMNH 975, a foot claw; UCMP 154569, a partial skeleton; MRF v06NTG, metatarsus	A large ornithomimid similar to Gallimimus in size. Also found in the Lance Formation.	
Ornithomimus	O. velox	Montana; South Dakota; North Dakota		Fragmentary specimens	An ornithomimid which was also found in the Denver Formation.	

==== Oviraptorosaurs ====
Oviraptorosaur fossils have been found at the Hell Creek Formation for many years, most notably from isolated elements until the discovery of Anzu. In the past, oviraptorosaur fossils found were thought to have belonged to Leptorhynchos, Caenagnathus, Chirostenotes, and Elmisaurus. In 2021, a large-bodied caenagnathid specimen (ROM VP 65884) from Montana was referred to cf. Anzu wyliei.

Color key: Taxon / Reclassified taxon / Taxon falsely reported as present / Dubious taxon or junior synonym / Ichnotaxon / Ootaxon / Morphotaxon

Notes
Uncertain or tentative taxa are in small text
~~crossed out~~ taxa are discredited.

Oviraptorosaurs reported from the Hell Creek Formation
Genus	Species	State	Stratigraphic position	Material	Notes	Images
Anzu	A. wyliei	North Dakota; South Dakota	Upper Hell Creek Formation	12 well-preserved specimens	One of the largest known oviraptorosaurs, and the largest known from North America. Material previously assigned to Caenagnathidae indet. is now placed in the genus Anzu.	
Caenagnathidae indet.	Indeterminate	Montana			Similar to Citipes and Elmisaurus.	
Eoneophron	E. infernalis	South Dakota		A partial right hindlimb	Closely related to Citipes and Elmisaurus	
Infernogallus	I. jamesi	Montana; North Dakota; South Dakota	Upper Hell Creek Formation	Articulated partial skeleton and several isolated mandibular remains	A caenagnathid close to traditional 'elmisaurines'	

==== Eumaniraptorans ====
Historically, numerous teeth have been attributed to various dromaeosaurid and troodontid taxa with known body fossils from only older formations, including Saurornithoides, Zapsalis, Dromaeosaurus, Saurornitholestes, and Troodon. However, in a 2013 study, Evans et al. concluded that there is little evidence for more than a single dromaeosaurid taxon, Acheroraptor, in the Hell Creek-Lance assemblages, which would render these taxa invalid for this formation. This was seemingly disproven in 2015, when DePalma et al., described the new genus Dakotaraptor, a large species of dromaeosaur. However, Dakotaraptor's validity has been called into question since, as the holotype may be a chimeric assemblage of various non-dromaeosaurid coelurosaurians. Fossilized teeth of various troodontids and coelurosaurs are common throughout the Hell Creek Formation; the best known examples include Paronychodon, Pectinodon and Richardoestesia, respectively. Teeth belonging to possible intermediate species of Dromaeosaurus and Saurornitholestes have been unearthed at the Hell Creek Formation and the nearby Lance Formation.

Eumaniraptorans reported from the Hell Creek Formation
Genus	Species	State	Stratigraphic position	Material	Notes	Images
Acheroraptor	A. temertyorum	Montana; North Dakota?; South Dakota?	Lower to middle? or upper Hell Creek Formation	ROM 63777, a maxilla and tooth; ROM 63778, a partial dentary; isolated teeth	A velociraptorine dromaeosaurid. Teeth previously referred to various Campanian dromaeosaurids Saurornitholestes and Dromaeosaurus, frequently found throughout the formation, probably belong to this one species. Evans et al. conclude that there is little evidence for the former two taxa being present in the Hell Creek-Lance assemblages.	
Avisaurus	A. archibaldi	Montana	Middle Hell Creek Formation	UCMP 117600, holotype, a tarsometatarsus; PU 17324, a tarsometatarsus	An avisaurid.	
Avisaurus	cf. A. archibaldi	Montana	Uppermost Hell Creek Formation	YPM 57235, a coracoid	An avisaurid tentatively referred to A. archibaldi based on its size.	
Avisaurus	A. darwini	Montana		DDM 1577.730, a right tarsometatarsus		
Avisaurus	A. sp.	Montana		distal tarsals, metatarsus (juvenile); MOR3070, a partial right tarsometatarsus		
Brodavis	B. baileyi	South Dakota		UNSM 50665, a left tarsometatarsus missing proximal end, trochleae II and III.	A primitive hesperornithiform.	
Dakotaraptor	D. steini	South Dakota	Upper Hell Creek Formation	PBMNH.P.10.113.T, a partial skeleton.; PBMNH.P.10.115.T, a tibia.; PBMNH.P.10.118.T, an astragalocalcaneum.; isolated teeth.	A large dromaeosaurid. Possibly chimeric.	
Magnusavis	M. ekalakaensis	Montana		CCM V2019.5.1, partial right tarsometatarsus and toe bone	A large enantiornithine closely related to avisaurids.	
Paronychodon	P. caperatus	North Dakota, South Dakota, and Montana.		YPM 10624, a fossilized tooth. Teeth of this genus have been found too.	A troodontid theropod who is known from fossil teeth. Fossils have also been found in the Lance Formation in Wyoming.	
Pectinodon	P. bakkeri	Montana		Teeth	A troodontid theropod who is known from fossil teeth. Fossils have also been found in the Lance Formation in Wyoming.	
Potamornis	P. skutchi	Montana		UCMP 117605, a tarsometatarsus	A hesperornithiform also found in the Lance Formation.	
Richardoestesia	R. sp.	Montana.		Teeth.	A coelurosaur that is known from teeth and from two species Richardoestesia gilmorei and Richardestesia isosceles, which have also been unearthed in the Lance Formation in Wyoming.	
"Styginetta"	"S. lofgreni."	Montana.			A Presbyornithid, it is notable for being one of the few birds known to have survived the Cretaceous–Paleogene extinction event.	
"Unnamed enantiornithine B"	Unnamed	Montana		YPM 57823, a partial coracoid	An unnamed enantiornithean.	
"Unnamed hesperornithiform A"	Unnamed	Montana		UCMP 13355, a tarsometatarsus	A primitive hesperornithiform. The Hell Creek specimen was referred to the same unnamed taxon as RSM P 2315.1 from the Canadian Frenchman Formation. RSM P 2315.1 was later made the holotype of Brodavis americanus. May be a synonym of Potamornis.	
"Unnamed ornithurine B"	Unnamed	Montana		UCMP 129143, a partial coracoid	An ornithurine possibly similar to Cimolopteryx	
"Unnamed ornithurine C"	Unnamed	Montana; South Dakota		SDSM 64281A, a partial coracoid; SDSM 64281B, a partial coracoid; UCMP 175251, a partial coracoid; MOR 2918, a partial coracoid	An ornithurine, also present in the Lance Formation and Fort Union Formation, one of the few individual bird species known to have survived the Cretaceous–Paleogene extinction	
"Unnamed ornithurine D"	Unnamed	Montana		UCMP 187207, a partial coracoid	An ichthyornithean also present in the Frenchman Formation	

== Pterosaurs ==
Undescribed pterosaur remains were reported from North Dakota. Undescribed pteranodontian specimen has also been mentioned in the supplementary material of Longrich et al. (2018).

Pterosaurs of the Hell Creek Formation
Taxa	Species	State	Stratigraphic location	Material	Notes	Images
Infernodrakon	I. hastacollis	Montana		A single neck vertebrae	A single azhdarchid neck bone originally considered to belong to the genus Quetzalcoatlus.	

== Crocodylomorphs ==
Color key: Taxon / Reclassified taxon / Taxon falsely reported as present / Dubious taxon or junior synonym / Ichnotaxon / Ootaxon / Morphotaxon

Notes
Uncertain or tentative taxa are in small text
~~crossed out~~ taxa are discredited.

Crocodylomorphs reported from the Hell Creek Formation
Genus	Species	State	Stratigraphic position	Material	Notes	Images
Borealosuchus	B. sternbergii	Montana; North Dakota; South Dakota			Extinct genus of possible crocodylians that lived from the Late Cretaceous to the Eocene in North America.	
Brachychampsa	B. montana	Montana; South Dakota; North Dakota			Extinct genus of alligatoroid.	
Thoracosaurus	T. neocesariensis	Montana			Extinct genus of possible gavialoid crocodilian which existed during the Late Cretaceous and early Paleocene.	

== Turtles ==
Color key: Taxon / Reclassified taxon / Taxon falsely reported as present / Dubious taxon or junior synonym / Ichnotaxon / Ootaxon / Morphotaxon

Notes
Uncertain or tentative taxa are in small text
~~crossed out~~ taxa are discredited.

Turtles reported from the Hell Creek Formation
Genus	Species	State	Stratigraphic position	Material	Notes	Images
Adocus	Indeterminate	Montana			Extinct genus of aquatic turtles belonging to the family Adocidae.	
Axestemys	A. infernalis	Montana; North Dakota; South Dakota; Wyoming			A turtle belonging to the family Trionychidae. Its fossils from the Hell Creek Formation were formerly assigned to the late Campanian species Axestemys splendidus.	
Compsemys	C. victa	Montana			A relative of Dermatemydidae.	
Peckemys	P. brinkman	Montana; North Dakota			A relative of Baenidae.	
Emarginachelys	E. cretacea	Montana			A relative of chelydrids.	
Eubaena	E. cephalica	Montana			Baenid turtle	
Gamerabaena	G. sonsalla	North Dakota			Extinct genus of baenid turtle.	
Palatobaena	P. cohen	North Dakota			A relative of extinct family of cryptodiran turtles.	
Cedrobaena	C. putorius	South Dakota; North Dakota			A relative of Baenidae.	
Gilmoremys	G. lancensis	Montana; North Dakota			Trionychidae related to the softshell turtle.	
Hoplochelys	H. clark	North Dakota			A kinosternoid related to the Central American river turtle.	
Hutchemys	H. walkerorum	North Dakota		A shell	A Plastomeninae related to the softshell turtle.	
Plastomenus	P. sp				Trionychidae turtle.	
Basilemys	B. sinuosa				Largest dermatemydid land tortoise.	
Trionyx	Indeterminate	Montana			A genus of softshell turtles belonging to the family Trionychidae.	
Aspideretoides	A. foveatus				Trionychidae turtle.	
Helopanoplia	H. distincta				Trionychidae turtle.	
Judithemys	J. backmani				Thin-shelled macrobaenid turtle.	
Plesiobaena	P. antiqua				Baenid turtle.	
Stygiochelys	S. estesi				Baenid turtle.	
Neurankylus	N. eximius				Largest baenid turtle in Hell Creek Formation.	
Saxochelys	S. gilberti	North Dakota		A population of over 30 individual skeletons	A member of the family Baenidae.	
Thescelus	T. insiliens				Baenid turtle.	
Chelydridae indet.	Indeterminate				Chelydrids-like turtle.	

== Squamata ==
Color key: Taxon / Reclassified taxon / Taxon falsely reported as present / Dubious taxon or junior synonym / Ichnotaxon / Ootaxon / Morphotaxon

Notes
Uncertain or tentative taxa are in small text
~~crossed out~~ taxa are discredited.

Squamates reported from the Hell Creek Formation
Genus	Species	State	Stratigraphic position	Material	Notes	Images
Cemeterius	C. monstrosus	Montana			A platynotan lizard of uncertain phylogenetic placement, also known from the Lance Formation.	
Cerberophis	C. robustus	Montana			An alethinophidian snake of uncertain phylogenetic placement.	
Obamadon	O. gracilis	Montana			A polyglyphanodontian lizard of uncertain phylogenetic placement. Also known from the Lance Formation.	
Peneteius	P. aquilonius	Montana			A chamopsiid polyglyphanodontian lizard.	
Haptosphenus	H. placodon				Teiid lizard.	
Leptochamops	L. denticulatus				Small teiid lizard.	
Chamops	C. segnis				Largest teiid lizard in Hell Creek Formation	
Contogenys	C. sloani				Scincid? lizard.	
Exostinus	E. lancensis				Xenosaurid lizard.	
Proxestops	P. jepseni				Anguid lizard.	
Parasaniwa	P. wyomingensis				Necrosaurid lizard.	
Paraderma	P. bogerti				Helodermatid? lizard.	
Palaeosaniwa	P. canadensis				A large monstersaurian lizard, closely related to today's varanid lizards. It was the largest lizard in the Hell Creek formation.	
Boidae indet.	Indeterminate				A snake; the earliest-known boid.	
Mosasaurinae indet.	Indeterminate	North Dakota	Lower Hell Creek Formation		Indeterminate mosasaurine remains from the marine Breien Member, with an estimated body length of 11 m (36 ft).	
Prognathodontini indet.	Indeterminate	North Dakota	Lower Hell Creek Formation		Known from a tooth crown discovered from the freshwater deposits, associated with the tooth of T. rex, maxilla of crocodilian and tooth of hadrosaur; stratigraphic position above the marine Breien member.	

== Choristoderans ==
Color key: Taxon / Reclassified taxon / Taxon falsely reported as present / Dubious taxon or junior synonym / Ichnotaxon / Ootaxon / Morphotaxon

Notes
Uncertain or tentative taxa are in small text
~~crossed out~~ taxa are discredited.

Choristoderans reported from the Hell Creek Formation
Genus	Species	State	Stratigraphic position	Material	Notes	Images
Champsosaurus	C. ambulator; C. laramiensis	Montana			A champsosaur. Indeterminate species also known from North Dakota.	

== Mammals ==
=== Multituberculates ===
Color key: Taxon / Reclassified taxon / Taxon falsely reported as present / Dubious taxon or junior synonym / Ichnotaxon / Ootaxon / Morphotaxon

Notes
Uncertain or tentative taxa are in small text
~~crossed out~~ taxa are discredited.

Multituberculates reported from the Hell Creek Formation
Genus	Species	State	Stratigraphic position	Material	Notes	Images
Cimexomys	C. minor	Montana			A multituberculate of uncertain phylogenetic placement.	
Cimolodon	C. nitidus	Montana; North Dakota			A cimolodontid multituberculate.	
Cimolodon	C. cf. nitidus	South Dakota			A cimolodontid multituberculate.	
Cimolodon	C. sp.	North Dakota			A cimolodontid multituberculate.	
Cimolomys	C. gracilis	Montana			A cimolomyid multituberculate.	
Cimolomys	C. cf. gracilis	South Dakota			A cimolomyid multituberculate.	
Essonodon	E. browni	Montana			A cimolomyid multituberculate.	
Meniscoessus	M. conquistus	South Dakota			A cimolomyid multituberculate.	
Meniscoessus	M. robustus	Montana; North Dakota; South Dakota			A cimolomyid multituberculate.	
Meniscoessus	M. cf. robustus	South Dakota			A cimolomyid multituberculate.	
Meniscoessus	M. sp.	North Dakota			A cimolomyid multituberculate.	
Meniscoessus	?M. sp.	North Dakota			A cimolomyid multituberculate.	
Mesodma	M. formosa	Montana; South Dakota			A neoplagiaulacid multituberculate.	
Mesodma	M. cf. formosa	Montana			A neoplagiaulacid multituberculate.	
Mesodma	M. hensleighi	Montana; South Dakota			A neoplagiaulacid multituberculate.	
Mesodma	M. cf. hensleighi	South Dakota			A neoplagiaulacid multituberculate.	
Mesodma	M. thompsoni	Montana; North Dakota; South Dakota			A neoplagiaulacid multituberculate.	
Mesodma	M. cf. thompsoni	Montana			A neoplagiaulacid multituberculate.	
Mesodma	M sp.	Montana			A neoplagiaulacid multituberculate.	
Mesodma	?M sp.	Montana			A neoplagiaulacid multituberculate.	
?Neoplagiaulax	?N. burgessi	Montana			A neoplagiaulacid multituberculate.	
Paracimexomys	P. priscus	Montana			A multituberculate of uncertain phylogenetic placement.	
Paressonodon	P. nelsoni				A cimolomyid multituberculate.	
Stygimys	S. kuszmauli	Montana			It was a member of the extinct order Multituberculata.	
Valenopsalis	V. joyneri	Montana			It was the most basal representative of Taeniolabidoidea.	

=== Metatherians ===
Color key: Taxon / Reclassified taxon / Taxon falsely reported as present / Dubious taxon or junior synonym / Ichnotaxon / Ootaxon / Morphotaxon

Notes
Uncertain or tentative taxa are in small text
~~crossed out~~ taxa are discredited.

Metatherians reported from the Hell Creek Formation
Genus	Species	State	Stratigraphic position	Material	Notes	Images
Alphadon	A. marshi	Montana; North Dakota			An alphadontid. genus of small, primitive mammal that was a member of the Metatheria, a group of mammals that includes modern-day marsupials.	
Alphadon	A. cf. marshi	Montana; South Dakota			An alphadontid.	
Alphadon	A. wilsoni	Montana			An alphadontid.	
Alphadon	A. cf. wilsoni	Montana			An alphadontid.	
Alphadon	A. sp.	North Dakota; South Dakota			An alphadontid.	
Didelphodon	D. padanicus	South Dakota			A stagodontid.	
Didelphodon	D. vorax	Montana; North Dakota			A stagodontid. genus of Stagodontidae marsupials from the Late Cretaceous of North America.	
Didelphodon	D. cf. vorax	South Dakota			A stagodontid.	
Didelphodon	D. sp.	North Dakota			A stagodontid.	
Didelphodon	cf. D. sp.	North Dakota; South Dakota			A stagodontid.	
Glasbius	G. twitchelli	Montana			A glasbiid.	
Glasbius	G. cf. twitchelli	Montana			A glasbiid.	
Leptalestes	L. cooki	Montana			A pediomyid.	
Leptalestes	L. krejcii	Montana; South Dakota			A pediomyid.	
Nanocuris	N. improvida				A deltatheridiid.	
Nortedelphys	N. jasoni (= N. intermedius)	Montana; South Dakota			A herpetotheriid.	
Pediomys	P. elegans	Montana; South Dakota			A pediomyid.	
Protalphadon	P. foxi	Montana			An alphadontid.	
Protalphadon	P. lulli	Montana			An alphadontid.	
Protolambda	P. florencae	Montana; North Dakota; South Dakota			A pediomyid.	
Protolambda	P. hatcheri	Montana; South Dakota			A pediomyid.	
Protolambda	P. mcgilli	Montana			A pediomyid.	
Turgidodon	T. rhaister	Montana			An alphadontid.	

=== Eutherians ===
Color key: Taxon / Reclassified taxon / Taxon falsely reported as present / Dubious taxon or junior synonym / Ichnotaxon / Ootaxon / Morphotaxon

Notes
Uncertain or tentative taxa are in small text
~~crossed out~~ taxa are discredited.

Eutherians reported from the Hell Creek Formation
Genus	Species	State	Stratigraphic position	Material	Notes	Images
Altacreodus	A. magnus	Montana; North Dakota			a possible creodont, formerly a species of Cimolestes	
Alostera	A. saskatchewanensis	Montana			A eutherian of uncertain phylogenetic placement.	
Ambilestes	A. cerberoides	Montana			A eutherian of uncertain classification, formally a species of Cimolestes	
Batodon	B. tenuis	Montana			A cimolestid eutherian.	
Cimolestes	C. incisus	Montana			A cimolestid eutherian.	
Cimolestes	C. stirtoni	Montana			A cimolestid eutherian.	
Gypsonictops	G. hypoconus	Montana; South Dakota			A gypsonictopsid eutherian.	
Gypsonictops	G. illuminatus	Montana; North Dakota			A gypsonictopsid eutherian.	
Gypsonictops	G. cf. illuminatus	Montana			A gypsonictopsid eutherian.	
Gypsonictops	G. sp.	Montana			A gypsonictopsid eutherian.	
cf. Paranyctoides	cf. Paranyctoides sp.	Montana			A nyctitheriid eutherian.	
Protungulatum	P. coombsi	Montana			A stem-placental.	
Purgatorius	P. ceratops	Montana			A genus with four species believed to be either stem-placentals or stem-primates.	
Scollardius	S. propalaeoryctes	Montana			A eutherian of uncertain classification, formally a species of Cimolestes	

== Flora ==
The Hell Creek Formation was a low floodplain at the time before the sea retreated, and in the wet ground of the dense woodland, the diversity of angiosperms and conifers were present. A diversity of herbaceous flowering plants, ferns and moss grew in the forest understory. On the exposed point bars of large river systems, there were shrubs and vines. The evidence of the forested environment is supported by petrified wood, rooted gley paleosols, and ubiquitous tree leaves. The presence of the simple and lobed leaves, combined with a high dicot diversity, extinct cycadeoid Nilssoniocladus, Ginkgo, many types of monocots, and several types of conifers is different from any modern plant community. There are numerous types of leaves, seeds, flowers and other structures from Angiosperms, or flowering plants. The Hell Creek Formation of this layer contains over 300 tablets, of which angiosperms are the most diverse and dominant flora of the population, about 90 percent, followed by about 5% of conifers, 4% of ferns, and others. Compared to today Hell Creek's flora which is prairie, then Hell Creek's flora was hardwood forest mixed with deciduous and evergreen forest. In sharp contrast to the Great Plains today, the presence of some thermophilous taxa such as palm trees and gingers meant the climate was warmer and wetter then.

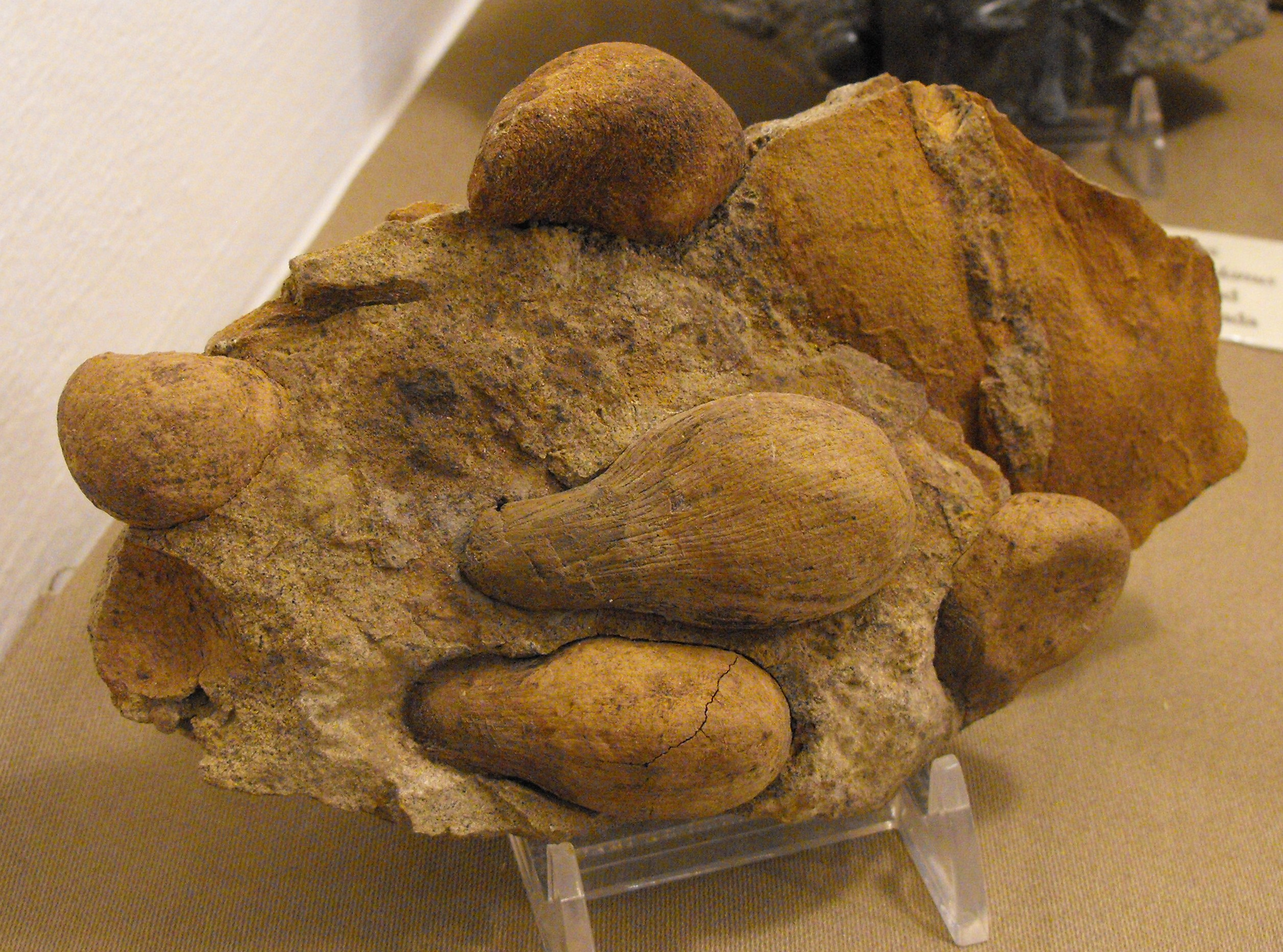
Fossil fruits from the Hell Creek Formation of Spinifructus antiquus of the palm family (Arecaceae).

The plants of the Hell Creek Formation generally represent angiosperm-dominated riparian forests of variable diversity, depending on stratigraphic position and sedimentary environment. There appears to be floral transitions visible on a stratigraphic range from the lower to the upper Hell Creek Formation. For this reason, Kirk Johnson and Leo Hickey divided it into five zones and described them as HCIa, HCIb, HCIIa, HCIIb, and HCIII as a reflection of floral change through time. For example, the HCIa zone is dominated by "Dryophyllum" subfalcatum, Leepierceia preartocarpoides, "Vitis" stantonii, and "Celastrus" taurenensis, and is located 55 to 105 meters below the K-Pg boundary layer. Although the HCIb zone is a very thin layer, about 5 meters of rock, it bears unusually high diversity of herbaceous and shrubby plants, including Urticaceae, Ranunculaceae, Rosaceae, and Cannabaceae.

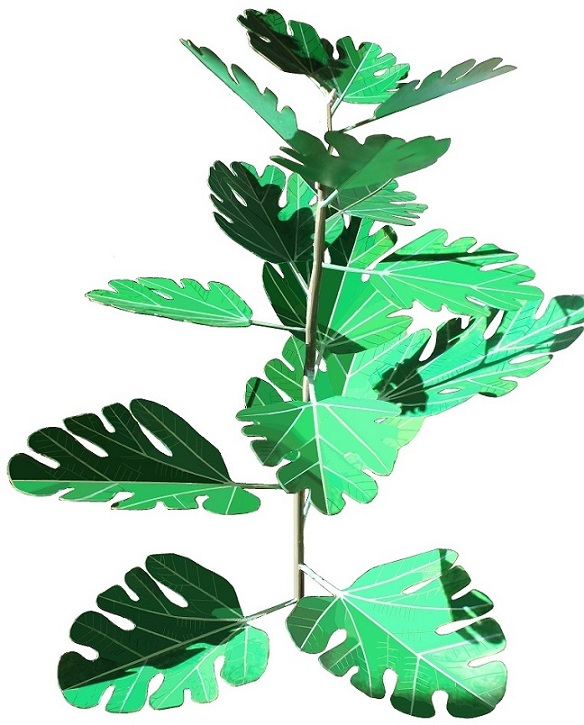
Bisonia niemii is one of the common fossil leaf species in the HCIII zone.

There is evidence of transitional floras in the middle of the Hell Creek Formation as shown by HCII and HCIII zones. The HCII flora represents a transitional period where taxa from the lower Hell Creek are replaced by the HCIII flora. The diversity of the HCIII zone is very high, and its composition is more uniform than that of HCII, many of which were rare or absent from the zones below, and some others that used to be common below became rarer in the HCIII zone. These forms include Elatides longifolia, "Dryophyllum" tennessensis, Liriodendrites bradacii, and many members of the Laurales including Bisonia niemii, "Ficus" planicostata, and Marmarthia trivialis, while "Celastrus" taurenensis, Leepierceia preartocarpoides, and many cupressaceous conifers became rarer. This phenomenon suggests that the global temperature was warming during the last 300,000-500,000 years of the Cretaceous period.

There is no evidence of fern prairie in the Hell Creek Formation. However, there was high angiosperm diversity — common plane trees, "Dryophyllum" subfalcatum, Leepierceia preartocarpoides, and sabal palms — along with extinct cycadeoid Nilssoniocladus, Ginkgo, araucariaceous, Taxodiaceous, and cupressaceous conifers. This represents the mixed deciduous and evergreen broad-leaved forest of the Hell Creek landscape. The nature of these forests is uncertain because Johnson found that the majority of the angiosperm and conifer genera are now extinct. He also believes that, very roughly 80% of the terrestrial plant taxa died out in what is now Great Plains at the K-Pg boundary. On other hand, there is a great increase in the abundance of fossil fern spores in the two centimeters of rock that directly overlies the impact fallout layer (the famous K-Pg boundary layer). This increase in fern spore abundance is commonly referred as "the fern spike" (meaning that if the abundance of spores as a function of stratigraphic position were plotted out, the graph would show a spike just above the impact fallout layer).

Many of the modern plant affinities in the Hell Creek Formation (e.g., those with the prefix "aff." or with quotes around the genus name) may not in reality belong to these genera; instead they could be entirely different plants that resemble modern genera. Therefore, there is some question regarding whether the modern Ficus or Juglans, as two examples, actually lived in the Late Cretaceous.

Compared to the rich Hell Creek Formation fossil plant localities of the Dakotas, relatively few plant specimens have been collected from Montana. A few taxa were collected at Brownie Butte Montana by Shoemaker, but most plants were collected from North Dakota (Slope County) and from South Dakota. Among the localities, the Mud Buttes, located in Bowman County, North Dakota, is probably the richest megaflora assemblage known and the most diverse leaf quarry from the Hell Creek Formation. "TYPE" after the binomial means that it is represented by a type specimen found in the Yale-Peabody Museum collections. "YPM" is the prefix for the Yale-Peabody Museum specimen number; "DMNH" is for the Denver Museum of Nature & Science; "USNM" is for Smithsonian National Museum of Natural History; and so on. The majority of Hell Creek megafloral specimens are collected at the Denver Museum of Nature & Science.

=== Overview (from Johnson, 2002) ===
302 plant morphotypes based on leaf only, including:

- 1 bryophyte (mosses and liverworts)
- 11 ferns
- 1 sphenopsid
- 10 conifers
- 1 ginkgo (uncommon)
- 278 angiosperms (roughly 92% of all taxa found)

=== Paleoflora ===
Color key: Taxon / Reclassified taxon / Taxon falsely reported as present / Dubious taxon or junior synonym / Ichnotaxon / Ootaxon / Morphotaxon

Notes
Uncertain or tentative taxa are in small text
~~crossed out~~ taxa are discredited.

==== Liverworts ====
Genus	Species	Location	Stratigraphic position	Abundance	Notes	Images
Marchantia	M. pealii				Only known liverwort in Hell Creek.	

==== Ferns ====
Genus	Species	Location	Stratigraphic position	Abundance	Notes	Images
Equisetum	E. sp.				Rare in the Hell Creek Formation.	
Polypodiaceae?	indeterminate					
Salvinia	S. sp.				Floating aquatic plant.	

==== Cycadophytes ====
Genus	Species	Location	Stratigraphic position	Abundance	Notes	Images
Nilssoniocladus	N. comtula				Unlike N. yukonensis, its leaves are pinnatisect pinnules. Common.	
Nilssoniocladus	N. yukonensis				The only Hell Creek Formation cycadeoid. A simple leaf. Common.	

==== Ginkgoales ====
Genus	Species	Location	Stratigraphic position	Abundance	Notes	Images
Ginkgo	G. adiantoides				The only ginkgoalean in the Hell Creek Formation; uncommon	

==== Conifers ====
Genus	Species	Location	Stratigraphic position	Abundance	Notes	Images
Cupressinocladus	C. interruptus				Casts of cupressaceae foliage, very common.	
Dammarites	D. sp.				A conifer seed cone. It's likely to belong to Elatides longifolia.	
Ditaxocladus	D. catenulata				A cupressaceous conifer closely related to Cupressinocladus, Common.	
Elatides	E. longifolia				Either a cupressaceous or Araucaria-like conifer. Less common in the lower 2/3 but more common in the upper 1/3 of the Hell Creek Formation.	
Glyptostrobus	G. europaeus				A very common conifer.	
Metasequoia	M. occidentalis				M. occidentalis seed cones are known from the Hell Creek.	
Taxodium	T. olrikii				Related to today's bald cypress.	
Sequoia	S. sp.				A Redwood, over 52 specimens are known from Hell Creek over 12 different localities.	

==== Angiosperms ====
Genus	Species	Location	Stratigraphic position	Abundance	Notes	Images
"Artocarpus"	"A." lessigiana				Abundant at Brownie Butte, Montana. Affinities with Sassafras in the Lauraceae.	
Araliaephyllum	A. polevoi				A lobed leaf. Closely relating to Bisonia. Fairly common.	
Averrhoites	cf. A. affinis				An uncommon taxon with compound leaves.	
Berberidaceae indet.					Common in HClb.	
"Betula"	"B." perantigua				Incertae sedis. Venation and tooth form consistent with the extant Betula.	
Bisonia	B. niemi				Belongs to Lauraceae, A common taxon. Type specimen was found in South Dakota.	
Browniea	B. serrata				In the Nyssaceae, closely relating to extant Camptotheca. Less common.	
Cannabaceae indet.					Belongs in Cannabaceae.	
Carpites	C. ulmiformis				Though this fossil fruit is abundant in the Early Paleocene, it's also found in Hell Creek. It may belong to Apiaceae.	
"Celastrus"	"C." taurenensis				Incertae sedis. It's common in the lowermost to the middle Hell Creek Formation, but less common in the upper 1/3 Hell Creek Formation.	
"Cinnamomum"	"C." lineafolia				Included in Ficus affinis by L. Hickey. Some other specimens referred to Cinnamomum sezanensis(?) sp.), a real cinnamon bush. Its affinity is questionable.	
Cissites	cf. C. acerifolia				This morphotype was first described from the Cenomanian Dakota Group.	
Cissites	C. insignis				This form is represented in the group of Cenomanian leaves from the Dakota Formation.	
Cissites	C. lobata				A lobed leaf with half-naked basal lateral veins. Common in the upper 1/3 of the Hell Creek Formation.	
Cissites	C. puilasokensis				A palmately lobed leaf with 5 primary veins. Common in the upper 1/3 of the Hell Creek Formation.	
Cobbania	C. corrugata				A prehistoric species of aroid, previously assigned to the genus Pistia.	
Cobbania	C. hickeyi				Another Cobbania species from pond sediments.	
Cornophyllum	C. newberryi				The majority of leaves are entire-margined but some may develop a few teeth. Belongs to Cornaceae.	
"Cyperacites"	"C." sp.				A reed-type plant.	
Dicotophyllum	D. anomalum				Incertae sedis.	
Dryophyllum	D. subfalcatum				This taxon is very common in the Hell Creek Formation, but is rare in Paleocene sediments. It is believed to be in Sabiaceae, closely related to the living Meliosma.	
Dryophyllum	"D." tenneseensis				This taxon is similar to D. subfalcatum but with high L/W ratio and craspedodromous venation.	
Erlingdorfia	E. montana				Johnson, 1996. In the Platanaceae. A very common taxon.	
Fagaceae indet.					Indeterminate Fagaceous leaves.	
"Ficus"	"F." planicostata				Despite the genus name, it's in Lauraceae.	
Grewiopsis	G. saportana				Belongs to Platanaceae.	
Harmsia	H. hydrocotyloidea				Incertae sedis. An uncommon taxon.	
Humulus?	aff. H sp.				May be related to the extant genus Humulus.	
Hydropteris	H. pinnata				Floating aquatic fern.	
Limnobiophyllum	L. scutatum				Floating aquatic monocot, closely related to Lemna.	
Liriodendrites	L. bradacii				Johnson, 1996. Belongs to Magnoliaceae, a common taxon.	
"Liriodendron"	"L." laramiense				Unlobed leaf. Related to Liriodendron, an uncommon taxon.	
Liriodendron	L. sp.				Four-lobed leaf. Related to Liriodendron, an uncommon taxon.	
Leepierceia	L. preartocarpoides				Belong to Platanaceae. Johnson, 1996.	
Laurophyllum	L. wardiana				Large leaves, closely related to "Dryophyllum" subfalcatum.	
Laurophyllum	L. lanceolatum				Belongs to Lauraceae.	
Marmarthia	M. johnsonii				A new Marmarthia species described in Peppe et al. 2007. Similar to Lindera.	
Marmarthia	M. pearsonii				Johnson, 1996. In the Lauraceae: a very common taxon.	
Marmarthia	M. trivialis				Johnson, 1996. In the Lauraceae: a very common taxon.	
"Myrica"	"M." torreyi				Incertae sedis. Not actually a bayberry.	
Nelumbo	N. sp.				One of the most common aquatic plants in Hell Creek.	
Nelumbium	N. montanum				An aquatic angiosperm, closely related to lotus. Uncommon.	
Nordenskioldia	N. borealis				A fossil fruit likely to belonging to Zizyphoides flabella.	
Paranymphaea	P. hastata				Despite the name, it's not related to extant genus Nymphaea. Belongs to Polygonaceae.	
Palaeoaster	P. porosa				A papaveraceous fruit.	
Penosphyllum	P. cordatum				Related to Sterculioideae. A common taxon.	
Platanites	P. marginata				Johnson, 1996. Belongs to Platanaceae, a common taxon.	
Platanites	P. raynoldsii				An uncommon taxon.	
Platanophyllum	P. sp.				Belongs to Platanaceae. Common in the lowermost Hell Creek.	
Porosia	P. verrucosa				A fossil fruit that may belong to Rutaceae.	
Quereuxia	Q. angulata				A water caltrop look-alike.	
Rannunculaceae indet.					Common in HCIb.	
Rhamnica	R. cleburnii				Possibly belongs to Rhamnaceae.	
Rosaceae indet.					Very common in HCIb.	
Sabalites	S. sp.				Coryphoid palm frond. A common taxon.	
Cf. Sarcandra	cf. S. sp.				Venation and tooth form similar to Sarcandra glabra. Belongs to Chloranthaceae.	
Spinifructus	S. antiquus				A fruit seed that may belong to the palm family (Arecaceae).	
Symplocarpus	S. hoffmaniae				Originally described as aff. Philodendron, now known to be related to Symplocarpus.	
Trochodendroides	T. arctica				A fossil fruit that may belong to Trochodendroides nebrascensis.	
Trochodendroides	T. ellipticum				A katsura look-alike. An uncommon taxon.	
Trochodendroides	T. genetrix				A katsura look-alike. A common taxon.	
Trochodendroides	T. nebrascensis				A very common taxon.	
Urticaceae indet.					Common in HCIb.	
"Vitis"	"V." stantonii				Possibly a member of the Platanaceae rather than Vitaceae	
"Ziziphus"	"Z." fibrillosus				A common taxon, possibly in Piperaceae.	
Zingiberopsis	Z. attenuata				Related to today's ginger plant. Its closest living relative is the Asian genus Alpinia. Some Hell Creek Formation specimens show damage from hispine beetles ("leaf beetles" (Wilf et al., 2000)).	
Zingiberopsis	Z. magnifolia				Another Zinigberopsis species, previously assigned to Canna? magnifolia.	
Zizyphoides	Z. flabella				An uncommon taxon.	

=== Palynology ===
Genus	Species	Location	Stratigraphic position	Abundance	Notes	Images
Abietineaepollenites	Abietineaepollenites foveoreticulatus	Montana			A conifer palynomorph	
Abietineaepollenites	Abietineaepollenites microalatus	Montana			A conifer palynomorph	
Abietineaepollenites	Abietineaepollenites varius	Montana			A conifer palynomorph	
Acanthotriletes	Acanthotriletes levidensis	Montana				
Alnipollenites	Alnipollenites verus	Montana				
Appendicisporites	Appendicisporites tricornitatus	Montana				
Aquilapollenites	Aquilapollenites amplus	Montana				
Aquilapollenites	Aquilapollenites attenuatus					
Aquilapollenites	Aquilapollenites collaris					
Aquilapollenites	Aquilapollenites conatus	Montana				
Aquilapollenites	Aquilapollenites delicatus	Montana				
Aquilapollenites	Aquilapollenites marmarthensis					
Aquilapollenites	Aquilapollenites polaris	Montana				
Aquilapollenites	Aquilapollenites pulvinus	Montana				
Aquilapollenites	Aquilapollenites pyriformis	Montana				
Aquilapollenites	Aquilapollenites quadricretaeus					
Aquilapollenites	Aquilapollenites quadrilobus					
Aquilapollenites	Aquilapollenites reductus	Montana				
Aquilapollenites	Aquilapollenites reticulatus	Montana				
Aquilapollenites	Aquilapollenites senonicus					
Aquilapollenites	Aquilapollenites turbidus					
Aquilapollenites	Aquilapollenites striatus					
Azolla	Azolla cretacea	Montana			A mosquito fern palynomorph	
Balmeisporites	Balmeisporites sp.					
Calamospora	Calamospora mesozoica	Montana				
Camarozonosporites	Camarozonosporites heskemensis	Montana				
Cicatricosisporites	Cicatricosisporites carlylensis	Montana				
Cicatricosisporites	Cicatricosisporites dorogensis	Montana				
Cingulatisporites	Cingulatisporites dakotaensis	Montana				
Cingulatisporites	Cingulatisporites scabratus	Montana				
Clavatricolpites	Clavatricolpites prolatus	Montana				
Concavisporites	Concavisporites rugulatus	Montana				
Concavisporites	Concavisporites rugulatus	Montana				
Converrucosisporites	Converrucosisporites sp.	Montana				
Corylus	Corylus granilabratus	Montana			A hazelnut palynomorph	
Cupanieidites	Cupanieidites major	Montana				
Cyathidites	Cyathidites foveolatus	Montana			A tree fern palynomorph	
Cyathidites	Cyathidites minor	Montana			A tree fern palynomorph	
Cyathidites	Cyathidites australis	North Dakota			A tree fern palynomorph	
Cyathidites	Cyathidites diaphana	North Dakota			A tree fern palynomorph	
Cycadopites	Cycadopites scabratus	Montana				
Deltoidospora	Deltoidospora diaphana	Montana				
Dicotetradites	Dicotetradites granulatus	Montana				
Ephedripites	Ephedripites ovatus	Montana				
Ephedripites	Ephedripites undulatus	Montana				
Erdtmanipollis	Erdtmanipollis cretaceus	Montana; South Dakota				
Gleicheniidites	Gleicheniidites excelsus	Montana				
Gleicheniidites	Gleicheniidites senonicus	Montana				
Gnetaceaepollenites	Gnetaceaepollenites eocenipites	Montana				
Haloragacidites	Haloragacidites quadratus	Montana				
Hamulatisporis	Hamulatisporis hamulatis	Montana				
Hymenophyllumsporites	Hymenophyllumsporites parvus	Montana			A fern spore palynomorph	
Hymenophyllumsporites	Hymenophyllumsporites pseudomaximus	Montana			A fern spore palynomorph	
Ilexpollenites	Ilexpollenites compactus					
Inaperturopollenites	Inaperturopollenites rugulatus	Montana				
Interpollis	Interpollis cf. I. supplingensis					
Kurtzipites	Kurtzipites trispissatus	Montana				
Kurtzipites	Kurtzipites trispissatus	Montana				
Laevigatosporites	Laevigatosporites anomalus	Montana				
Laevigatosporites	Laevigatosporites discordatus	Montana				
Laevigatosporites	Laevigatosporites gracilis	Montana				
Laevigatosporites	Laevigatosporites ovatus	Montana				
Liliacidites	Liliacidites variegatus	Montana				
Liliacidites	Liliacidites sp.	Montana				
Lycopodiumsporites	Lycopodiumsporites austroclavatidites	Montana				
Momipites	Momipites circularis	Montana				
Momipites	Momipites parvus	Montana				
Monosulcites	Monosulcites carpentieri	Montana				
Monosulcites	Monosulcites crescentus	Montana				
Monosulcites	Monosulcites latus	Montana				
Monosulcites	Monosulcites tectatus	Montana				
Monosulcites	Monosulcites sp.	Montana				
Myrtipites	Myrtipites granulatus	Montana				
Myrtipites	Myrtipites scabratus	Montana				
Nyssapollenites	Nyssapollenites analepticus	Montana				
Nyssapollenites	Nyssapollenites pseudocruciatus	Montana				
Osmundacidites	Osmundacidites wellmanii	Montana				
Pachysandra	Pachysandra cretaceae	Montana; South Dakota				
Palmidites	Palmidites maximus	Montana				
Peromonolites	Peromonolites granulatus	Montana				
Phyllocladidites	Phyllocladidites mawsonii	Montana				
Phyllocladidites	Phyllocladidites ruei	Montana				
Podocarpidites	Podocarpidites otagoensis	Montana				
Pinuspollenites	Pinuspollenites labdacus	North Dakota			A pine palynomorph showing evidence of the genus Pinus in Hell Creek.	
Pinuspollenites	Pinuspollenites sp	North Dakota			A pine palynomorph showing evidence of the genus Pinus in Hell Creek.	
Piceapollis	Piceapollis sp	North Dakota			A spruce palynomorph	
Polyadopollenites	Polyadopollenites psilatus	Montana				
Polycolpites	Polycolpites granulatus	Montana				
Polypodiidites	Polypodiidites inangahuensis	Montana				
Proteacidites	Proteacidites retusus	Montana				
Proteacidites	Proteacidites retusus	Montana				
Proteacidites	Proteacidites thalmannii	Montana				
Psilatricolporites	Psilatricolporites prolatus	Montana				
Pterocaryapollenites	Pterocaryapollenites stellatus	Montana				
Reticuloidosporites	Reticuloidosporites dentatus	Montana				
Schizosporis	Schizosporis complexus	Montana				
Schizosporis	Schizosporis parvus	Montana				
Spheripollenites	Spheripollenites subgranulatus	Montana				
Spinamonoporites	Spinamonoporites typicus	Montana				
Stereisporites	Stereisporites antiquasporites	Montana				
Stereisporites	Stereisporites psilatus	Montana				
Striainaperturites	Striainaperturites ovatus	Montana				
Styx	Styx major	Montana				
Styx	Styx minor	Montana				
Taxodiaceaepollenites	Taxodiaceaepollenites hiatus	Montana				
Triatriopollenites	Triatriopollenites granilabratus	Montana				
Tricolpites	Tricolpites bacustriatus	Montana				
Tricolpites	Tricolpites delicatulus	Montana				
Tricolpites	Tricolpites foveolatus	Montana				
Tricolpites	Tricolpites interangulus					
Tricolpites	Tricolpites parvistriatus	Montana				
Tricolpites	Tricolpites psilascabratus	Montana				
Tricolpites	Tricolpites reticulatus	Montana				
Tricolpites	Tricolpites striatus	Montana				
Tricolpopollenites	Tricolpopollenites clavireticulatus	Montana				
Tricolpopollenites	Tricolpopollenites megaexactus	Montana				
Tricolpopollenites	Tricolpopollenites microreticulatus	Montana				
Tricolpopollenites	Tricolpopollenites microscabratus	Montana				
Tricolpopollenites	Tricolpopollenites sp1, sp2	Montana				
Tricolporopollenites	Tricolporopollenites elongatus	Montana				
Tricolporopollenites	Tricolporopollenites foveotectatus	Montana				
Tricolporopollenites	Tricolporopollenites granustriatus	Montana				
Tricolporopollenites	Tricolporopollenites megaexactus	Montana				
Tricolporopollenites	Tricolporopollenites prolatus	Montana				
Tricolporopollenites	Tricolporopollenites striatus	Montana				
Triplanosporites	Triplanosporites sinuosus	Montana				
Triporopollenites	Triporopollenites rugatus	Montana				
Ulmipollenites	Ulmipollenites undulosus	Montana				
Ulmipollenites	Ulmipollenites verrucatus	Montana				
Ulmoideipites	Ulmoideipites tricostatus	Montana				
Wodehouseia	Wodehouseia spinata	Montana				
Zlivisporis	Zlivisporis blanensis	Montana				

== See also ==
- List of fossil sites (with link directory)
- Lists of dinosaur-bearing stratigraphic units
- Paleobiota of the Morrison Formation
- Lance fauna
- Cretaceous-Paleogene formations
  - Tremp Formation, Spain
  - Tremp Formation, Spain
  - Lefipán Formation, Argentina
  - López de Bertodano Formation, Antarctica
