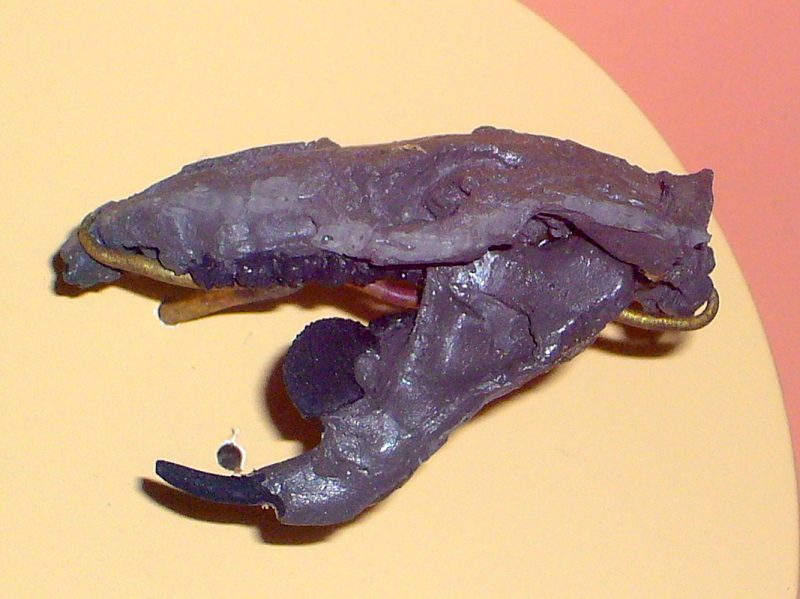
- Fossil skull of Cimolomys gracilis

Scientific classification
- Kingdom: Animalia
- Phylum: Chordata
- Class: Mammalia
- Order: †Multituberculata
- Suborder: †Cimolodonta
- Family: †Cimolomyidae; Marsh, 1889

Genera
- Buginbaatar; Camurodon; Cimolomys; Essonodon; Meniscoessus; ?Paressonodon; ?Parikimys

= Cimolomyidae =

Cimolomyidae Temporal range: Late Santonian to Late Maastrichtian, 85.8–66 Ma

Extinct family of mammals

Cimolomyidae is a family of fossil mammals within the extinct order Multituberculata. Representatives are known from the Late Cretaceous of North America and Mongolia, from the late Santonian to their extinction at the end of the Maastrichtian. The family is part of the suborder Cimolodonta. Other than that, their systematic relationships are hard to define. Some authors have placed the taxon within Taeniolabidoidea. Kielan-Jaworowska and Hurum (2001) expressly don't.

The family Cimolomyidae was named by Othniel Charles Marsh in 1889.
