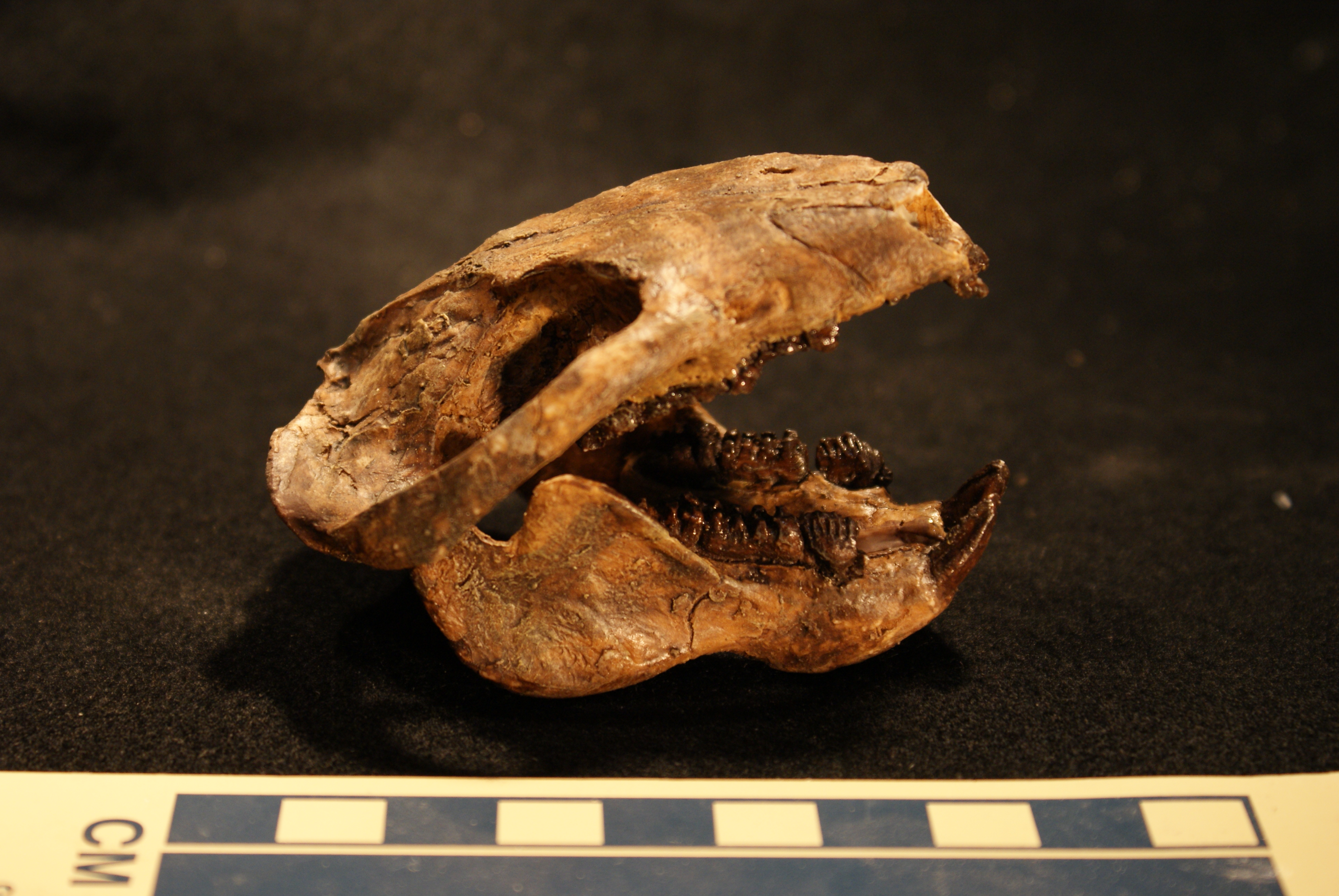
- Meniscoessus skull in the Rocky Mountain Dinosaur Resource Center, Woodland Park, Colorado

Scientific classification
- Kingdom: Animalia
- Phylum: Chordata
- Class: Mammalia
- Order: †Multituberculata
- Family: †Cimolomyidae
- Genus: †Meniscoessus; Cope, 1882

Species
- †M. collomensis; †M. conquistus; †M. ferox; †M. intermedius; †M. major; †M. robustus; †M. seminoensis

= Meniscoessus =

Meniscoessus Temporal range: Late Santonian to Maastrichtian, 84–66 Ma

Extinct genus of multituberculates

Meniscoessus is a genus of extinct multituberculates from the Upper Cretaceous Period that lived in North America.

It is a member of the order Multituberculata, belonging to the suborder Cimolodonta and family Cimolomyidae. The multituberculates were primitive, rodent-like mammals occupying the modern rodent ecological niche. They were significant for having diverged early in mammalian evolution, co-existing with dinosaurs for ~100 million years, surviving through the Cretaceous–Paleogene extinction event and lasting until the end of the Paleogene, likely having been replaced by true rodents.

Meniscoessus lived during the Santonian, Campanian and Maastrichtian ages of the Upper Cretaceous. This was a period of significant diversification of multiturbiculates, and evidence that contradicts the popular misconception that mammals were unable to thrive due to being outcompeted by the dinosaurs. They are useful as index fossils for the Judithian, Edmontonian, and Lancian faunal stages. Like most early mammals, Meniscoessus fossils mainly consist of teeth. Zofia Kielan-Jaworowska and Jørn Hurum considered them to be the "best known" members of the Cimolomyidae.

== Taxonomy ==
=== History ===
The genus Meniscoessus was named by Edward Drinker Cope in 1882. Members of this genus have been previously classified under the following genus names: Cimolomys (partly); Dipriodon; Halodon; Oracodon; Moeniscoessus; Selenacodon (partly); and Tripriodon. As Osborn pointed out in 1891, a number of erroneous discoveries had been made as a result of analyzing different teeth of the same animal, different individuals of the same species, and violating the principle of priority due to workers ignoring previously published discoveries.

There may have been confusion with some teeth described as belonging to small carnivorous dinosaurs. These were further christened Dipriodon, Tripriodon, and others, including Triprotodon. Close similarities were then noticed with an already established dinosaur genus, Paronychodon (Cope 1876), also based on teeth from the Laramie Formation. Over time, an impressive school of names was synonymized under P. However, this is now considered a nomen dubium.

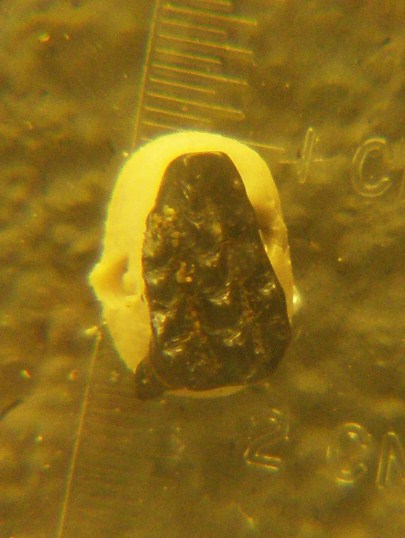
M. robustus tooth

=== Species ===
- Meniscoessus collomensis – Named by Jason A. Lillegraven in 1987. Fossil remains were first found in Upper Cretaceous strata of the Williams Fork Formation in Colorado. It appears useful as an index fossil for the Edmontonian faunal stage. It weighed an estimated 0.7 kilograms (1.5 lb).
- Meniscoessus conquistus – Named by Edward Drinker Cope in 1882. Remains were found in Maastrichtian strata of Colorado and St. Mary River Formation of Canada. Cope thought it "was about the size of the Australian bandicoot." M.conquistus is the type species of the genus Meniscoessus.
- Meniscoessus ferox – Named by Richard C. Fox in 1971. Remains were found in Campanian strata of the Upper Milk River Formation of Alberta, Canada. The holotype, collected in 1968, is in the University of Alberta collection.
- Meniscoessus intermedius – Named by Richard C. Fox in 1976. Remains were first found in Campanian and Maastrichtian strata of the Oldman Formation of Alberta and New Mexico, Utah, and Wyoming. It is estimated to have weighed about 500 grams (18 oz), as much as a large rat. They are the oldest member of the genus; their first appearance in the fossil record was 86 Million Years ago, during the Santonian age.
- Meniscoessus major – Named by Loris Shano Russell in the 1930s. It is also known as Cimolomys major (Russell 1936). Fossils of this species have been found in Campanian and Maastrichtian aged strata, from 79 to 69 Million years ago. The body mass of this species is estimated at 0.5 kilograms (1.1 lb). The holotype is in Alberta.

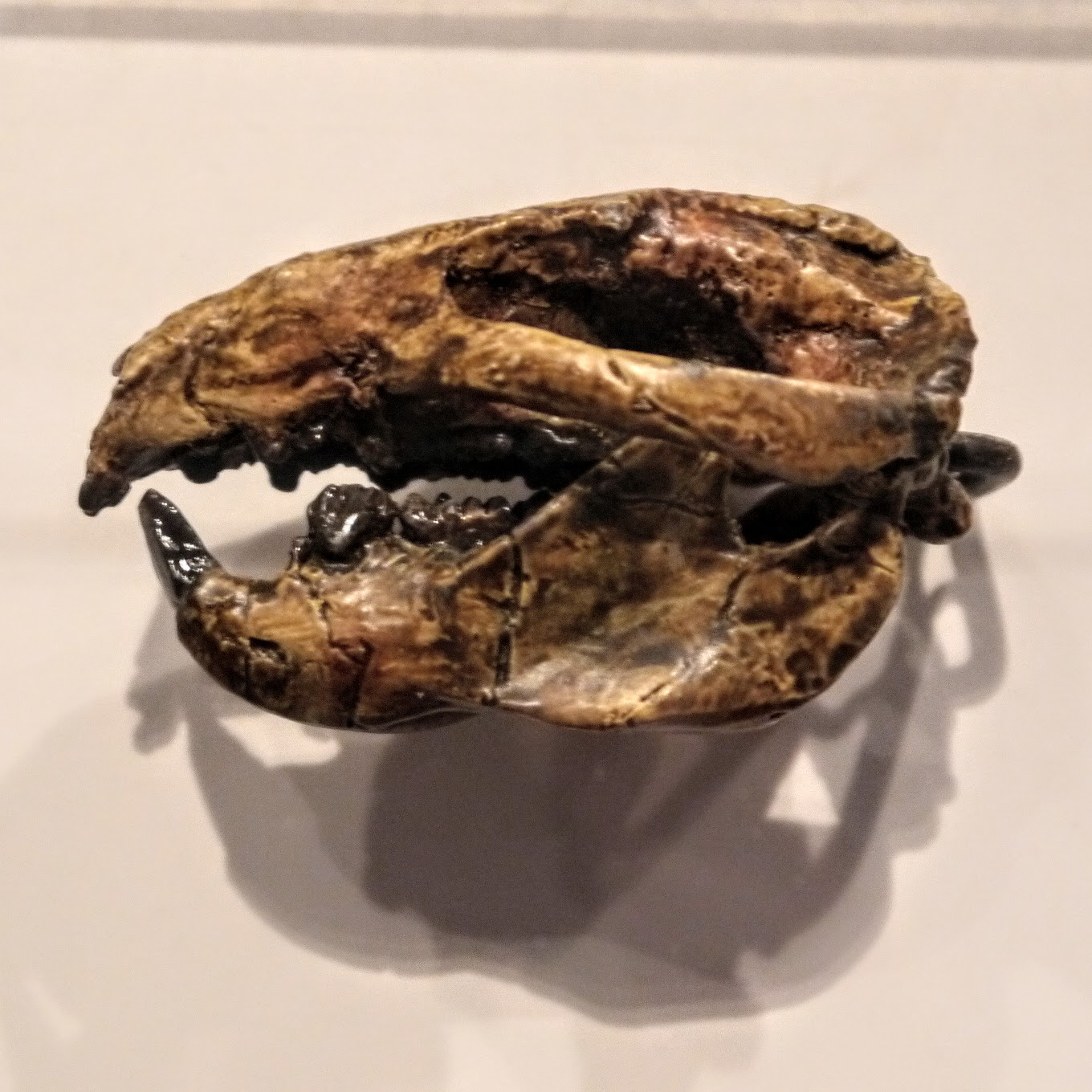
M. robustus skull

- Meniscoessus robustus – Named by Othniel Charles Marsh in 1889. Fossils have been found from Campanian to Maastrichtian strata of Wyoming, Montana, South Dakota and Alberta. There are controversial examples from one site in Alberta that may either be late Cretaceous(Lancian faunal stage) or early Paleocene(Puercan). Marsh thought that these organisms ranged from "rat" to "squirrel" to "rabbit" in size when they had lived. The weight of this species has been more recently estimated to be about 2.15 kilograms (4.7 lb). Marsh claimed discoveries of several new taxa in his 1889 work, but Osborn believed that many were synonymous with what is now M. robustus.
- Meniscoessus seminoensis – Named by Jaelyn J. Eberle and Jason A. Lillegraven in 1998. Remains were found in the Lancian faunal stage of the Maastrichtian strata of the Ferris Formation in Wyoming. A 3.5 centimetres (1.4 in) lower jaw fragment was found near the Seminoe Mountains, for which the species was named. It has a close resemblance to M. robustus, with the new species distinguished by its characteristic 4th premolar (P4). It was estimated to have a body mass of 1.5 kilograms (3.3 lb)

Several other names have been in circulation, such as Meniscoessus bustus, and Meniscoessus coelatus. The first is probably a variant of M. robustus, while the latter seems to have been connected with dinosaur teeth.
