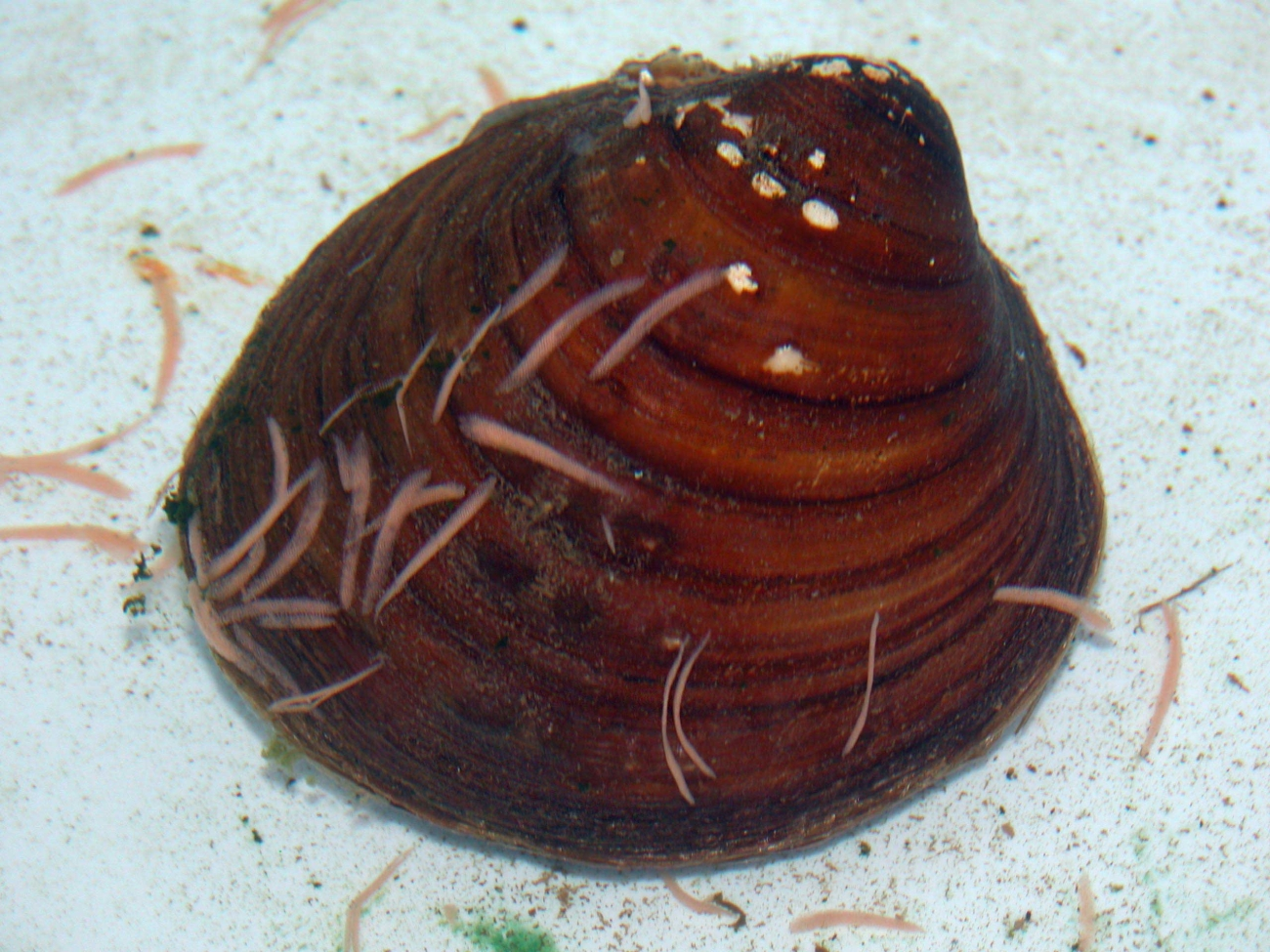

Conservation status
- Critically Endangered (IUCN 2.3)
- CITES Appendix I (CITES)

Scientific classification
- Kingdom: Animalia
- Phylum: Mollusca
- Class: Bivalvia
- Order: Unionida
- Family: Unionidae
- Genus: Plethobasus
- Species: P. cooperianus

Binomial name
- Plethobasus cooperianus (Lea, 1834)

= Plethobasus cooperianus =

Species of bivalve

Plethobasus cooperianus, the orange-footed pimpleback mussel or orangefoot pimpleback, is a rare species of freshwater mussel in the family Unionidae, the river mussels. This aquatic bivalve mollusk is native to the Tennessee, Cumberland, and lower Ohio Rivers in the United States, where its distribution has declined over 70%.

This rounded mussel grows up to 9.5 centimeters long by 7.8 wide by 4.6 high. It has bumps on the posterior part of the shell and the foot is orange in live specimens. The mussel mainly lives in deep, fast-flowing rivers, especially with gravel or sand on the bottoms. It buries itself in the substrate under up to 29 feet of water.

This species was once common in some areas. It is now restricted for several reasons. Rivers throughout much of its range have been impounded. There has been an increase in silt, which the mussel cannot tolerate. Pollution of the waterways has led to the decline of this and other mussels. The zebra mussel (Dreissena polymorpha) is a widespread threat.
