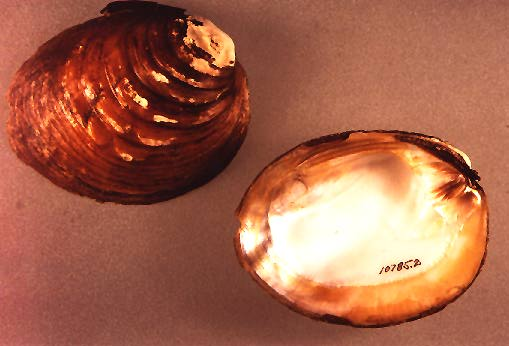

Conservation status
- Critically Endangered (IUCN 3.1)
- CITES Appendix I (CITES)

Scientific classification
- Kingdom: Animalia
- Phylum: Mollusca
- Class: Bivalvia
- Order: Unionida
- Family: Unionidae
- Genus: Plethobasus
- Species: P. cicatricosus

Binomial name
- Plethobasus cicatricosus (Say, 1829)

Synonyms
- Unio cicatricosus Say, 1829; Unio varicosus Lea, 1831; Unio detectus Frierson, 1911; Unio cicatricoides Frierson, 1911

= Plethobasus cicatricosus =

Species of bivalve

Plethobasus cicatricosus, the white warty-back pearly mussel or white wartyback, is a species of freshwater mussel in the family Unionidae, the river mussels. Once widely distributed in the Ohio, Cumberland, and Tennessee River systems in the United States, its range has declined dramatically to the point of near-extinction. It is a federally listed endangered species of the United States.

This mussel is yellow-green or yellow-brown in color. The nacre is white and partly iridescent. There is a row of tubercles on one edge of the shell.

The white wartyback lived in the main arteries of big rivers. It was distributed through Alabama, Illinois, Indiana, Kentucky, Ohio, Tennessee, and West Virginia. It has now been extirpated from all of these states except for Tennessee and Alabama, where it possibly remains in the main flow of the Tennessee River. However, no live individuals have been documented since 1997.

If a viable population is discovered, plans exist for the white wartyback to be reintroduced to the French Broad River and the Holston River in Tennessee. There are currently no live individuals that exist in laboratories or propagation facilities.
