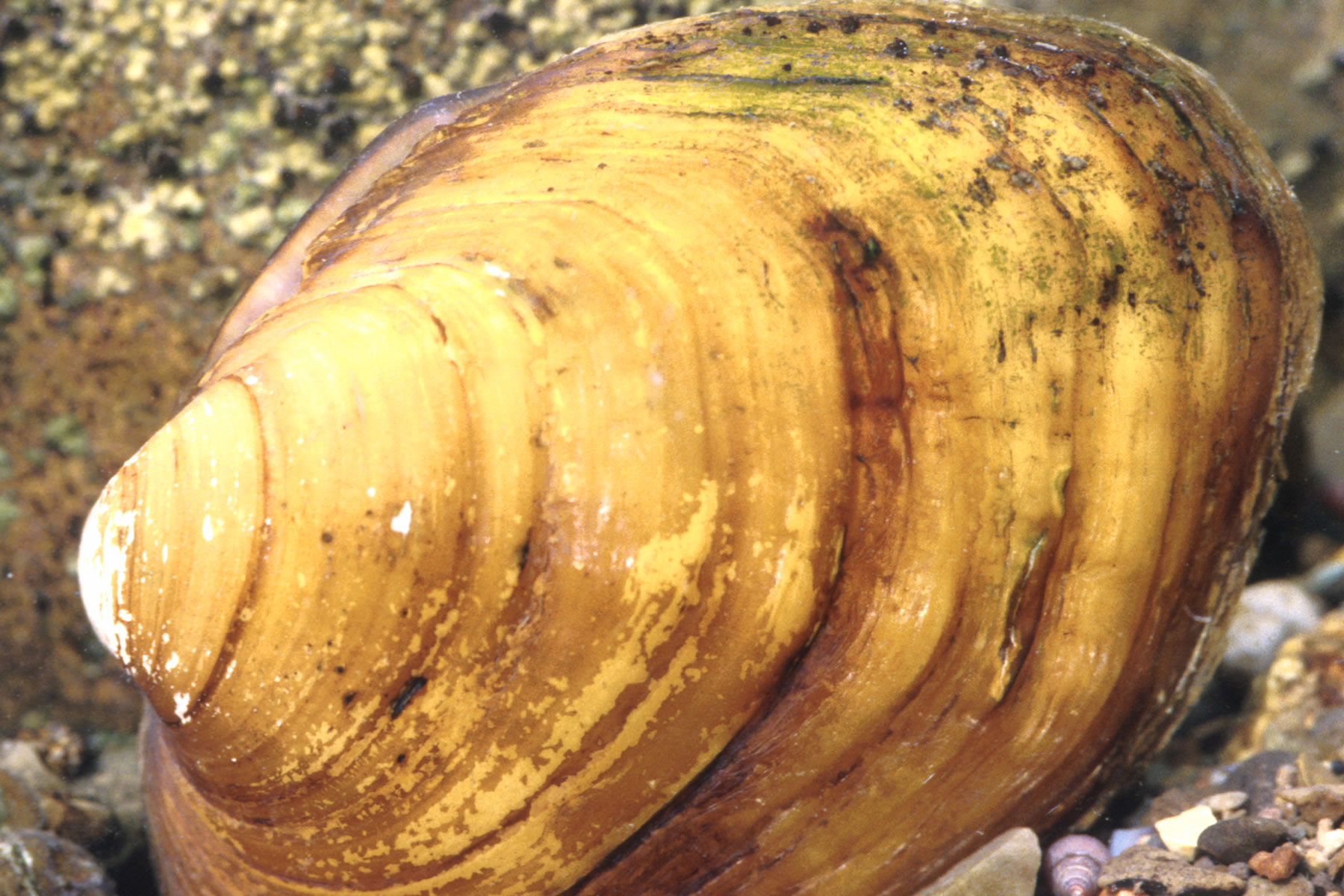

Conservation status
- Endangered (IUCN 3.1)

- Imperiled (NatureServe)

Scientific classification
- Kingdom: Animalia
- Phylum: Mollusca
- Class: Bivalvia
- Order: Unionida
- Family: Unionidae
- Genus: Plethobasus
- Species: P. cyphyus

Binomial name
- Plethobasus cyphyus Rafinesque, 1820

= Plethobasus cyphyus =

Species of bivalve

Plethobasus cyphyus, the sheepnose mussel, is a species of freshwater mussel, an aquatic bivalve mollusk in the family Unionidae, the river mussels.

This species is endemic to the Midwest and Southeast United States. It is currently listed as endangered by the U.S. Fish and Wildlife Service, and it is no longer present in two-thirds of the waterways in which it was historically found.

Host fish species for the sheepnose's glochidia include Pimephales promelas, Semotilus atromaculatus, Campostoma anomalum and Culaea inconstans, while attachment to sauger (Sander canadense) has been described but transformation into juvenile mussels following parasitism of this host has not been verified.

Common names used historically to refer to P. cyphyus include clear profit and bullhead.

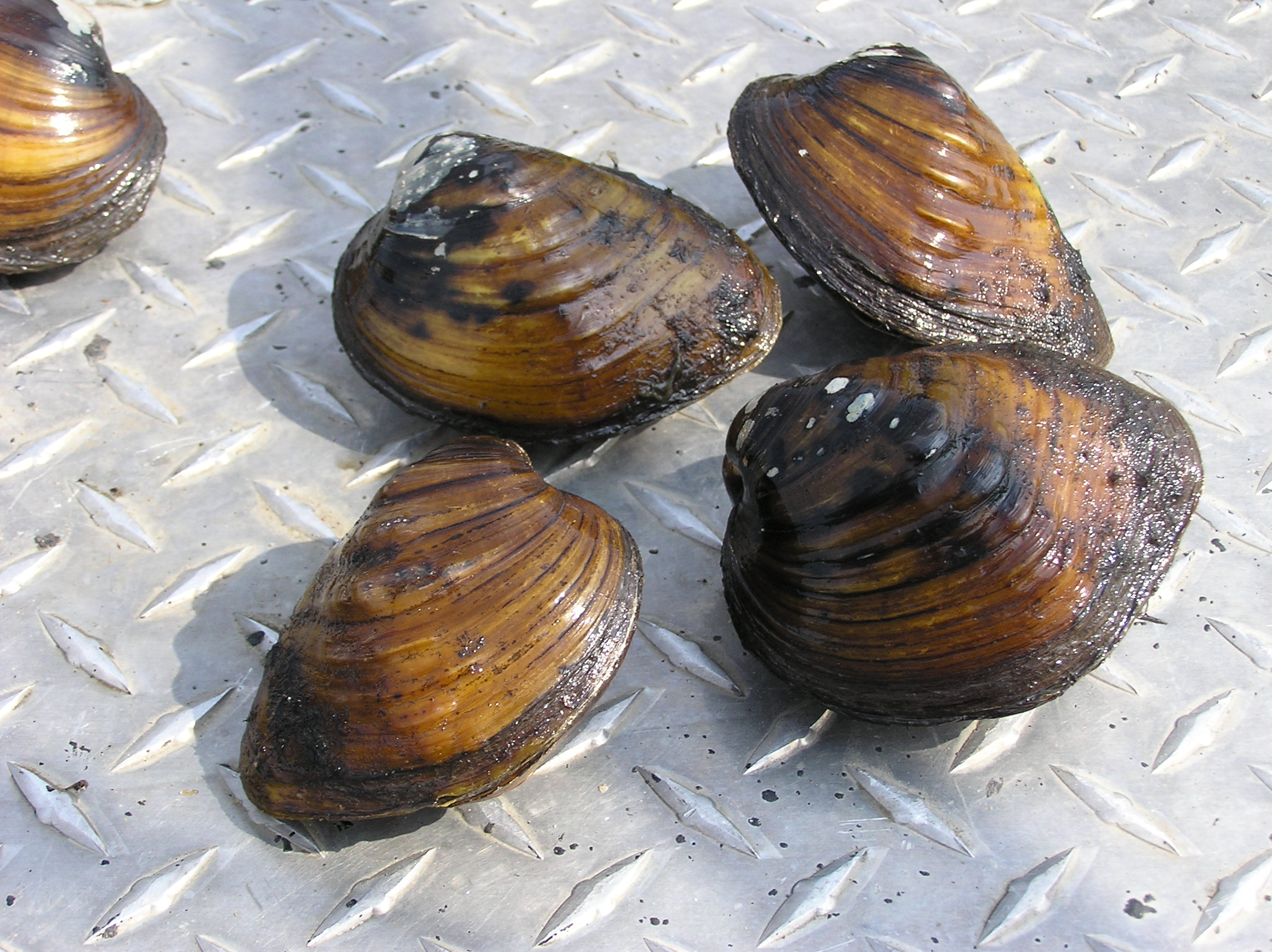
Individuals fresh from the water
