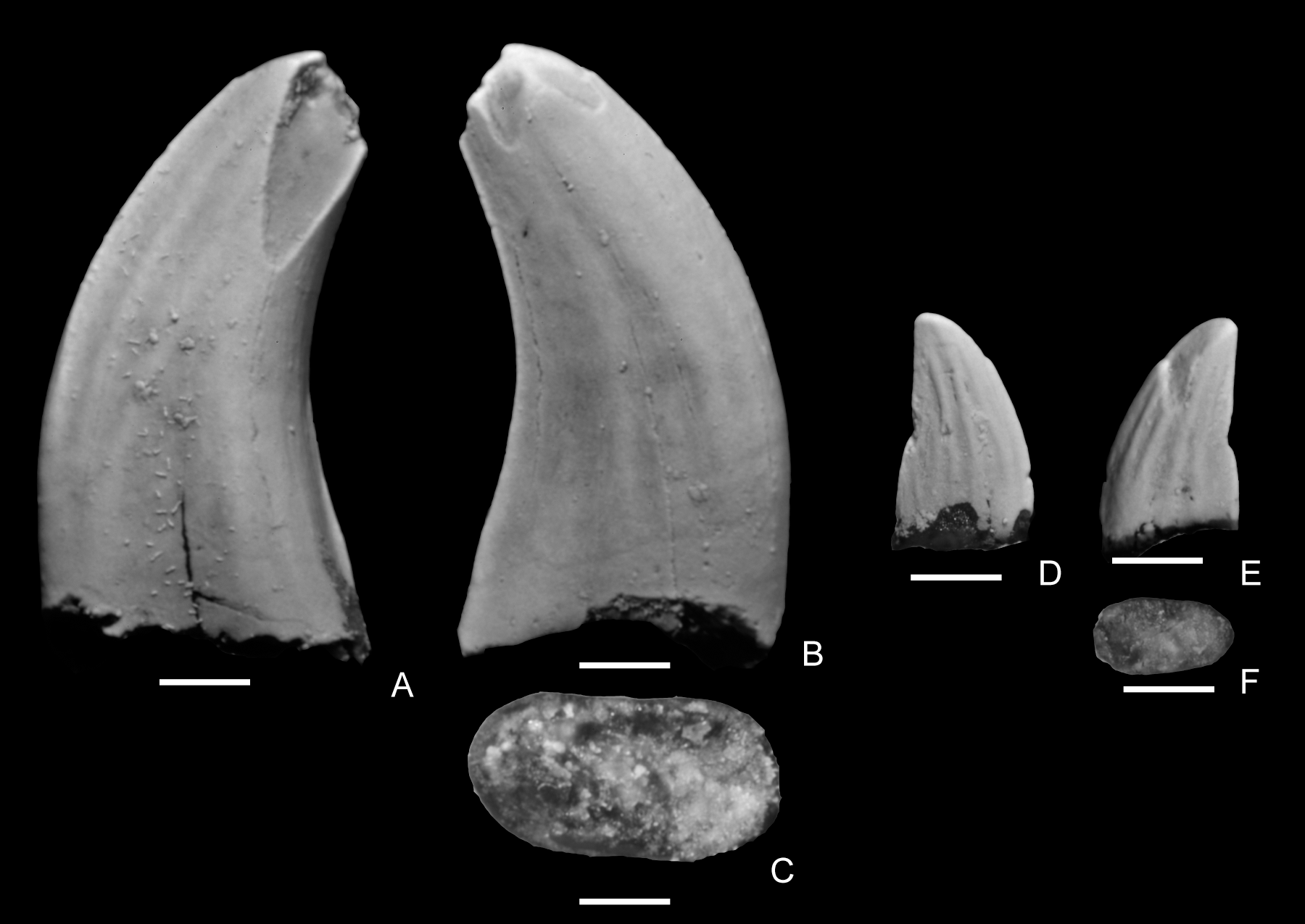
- Two referred teeth

Scientific classification
- Kingdom: Animalia
- Phylum: Chordata
- Class: Reptilia
- Clade: Dinosauria
- Clade: Saurischia
- Clade: Theropoda
- Family: †Troodontidae
- Genus: †Paronychodon; Cope, 1876

Type species
- †Paronychodon lacustris Cope, 1876

Species
- †P. lacustris Cope, 1876; †P. caperatus (Marsh, 1890 [originally Tripriodon])

= Paronychodon =

Paronychodon Temporal range: Late Cretaceous, 75–66 Ma

Extinct genus of dinosaurs

Paronychodon (meaning "beside claw tooth") is an extinct theropod dinosaur genus. It is a tooth taxon, often considered dubious because of the fragmentary nature of the fossils, which include "buckets" of teeth from many disparate times and places but no other remains, and should be considered a form taxon.

The type species, named by Edward Drinker Cope in 1876, is Paronychodon lacustris, from the Judith River Formation of Montana, dating to 75 million years ago, during the Campanian stage. The holotype is specimen AMNH 3018. It is a tooth about one centimetre long, elongated, recurved, lacking serrations, possessing low vertical ridges and with a D-shaped cross-section, the inner side being flattened. Cope at first thought the tooth belonged to a plesiosaur, but in the same year realised it represented a carnivorous dinosaur.

A second species, Paronychodon caperatus, is known from the Hell Creek Formation of North Dakota, Montana, and South Dakota and Lance Formation of Wyoming (latest Maastrichtian stage, 66 million years ago) and was originally referred to the mammal genus Tripriodon by Othniel Charles Marsh in 1889, but placed in Paronychodon by George Olshevsky in 1991. It is based on holotype YPM 10624, a tooth close in form to the holotype of P. lacustris but somewhat larger. In 1995 Olshevsky renamed Laelaps explanatus Cope 1876 into a Paronychodon explanatus; today the taxon is seen as based on Saurornitholestes teeth.

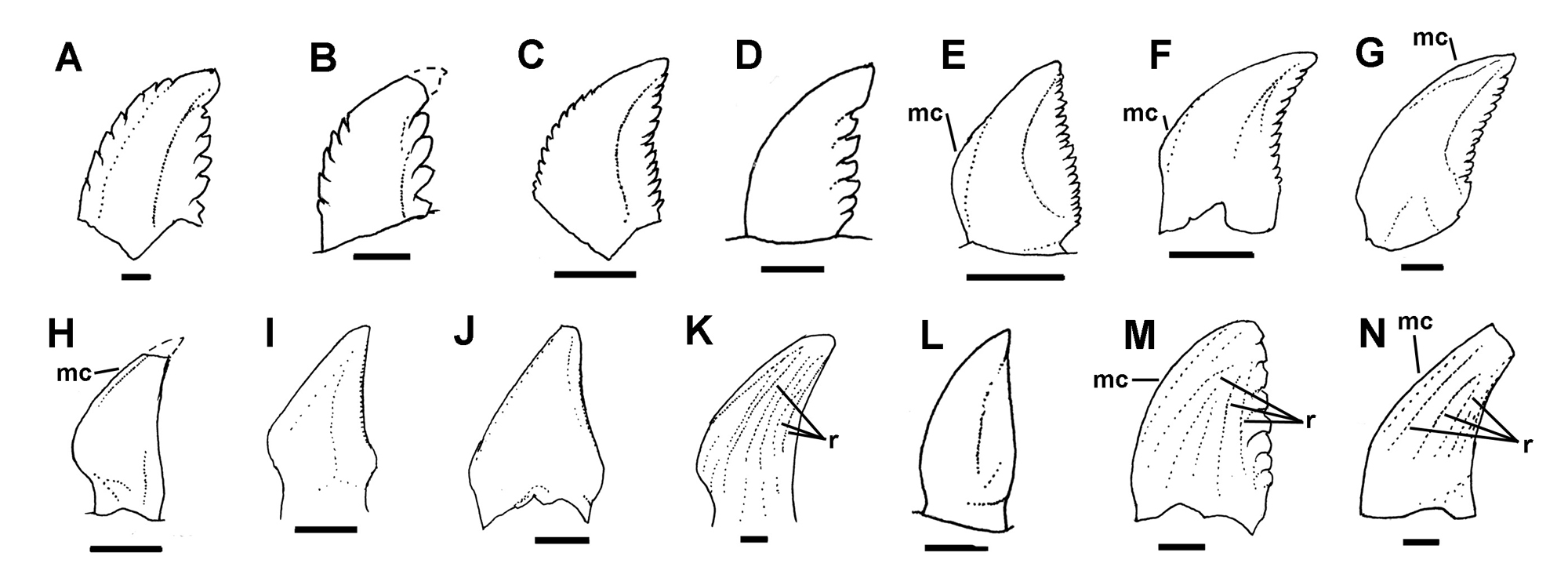
Comparison of troodontid teeth; K is P. lacustris

A very large number of other specimens matching these teeth in some or all aspects of their anatomy have been referred to Paronychodon. Some of these included serrated teeth, low teeth and teeth without a flattened side. These teeth of the general "Paronychodon" type have been reported from a wide variety of times and places, including the Early Cretaceous Una Formation of Spain, dating to the late Barremian age 125 million years ago.

Paronychodon has been considered a coelurid, an ornithomimosaur, a dromaeosaurid, an archaeopterygid, and a troodontid, though it could also be another kind of coelurosaurian theropod. While most researchers have therefore considered it simply represents indeterminate theropod teeth, a small consensus has found them to be Deinonychosauria. The teeth assigned to Paronychodon are all small, and may have come from various juvenile deinonychosaurs. Jaws from adult individuals bearing identical teeth have never been found. Marsh already suggested such teeth were pathological, having formed when the first teeth of the lower jaws by accident grew back-to-back to each other on the mandible suture. Philip J. Currie in 1990 also concluded to a malformation, thinking the flattened side resulted from the tooth remaining attached too long to the inner wall of the tooth-socket. Serrated specimens of the type would thus simply be deviant dromaeosaurid teeth; however, unserrated teeth might represent a separate taxon or taxa. One study, by Sunny Hwang, showed that the tooth enamel is identical to that found in Byronosaurus, a troodontid known from juveniles with serration-less teeth.

Several taxa have on occasion been considered synonyms of Paronychodon, though there is little consensus. Paronychodon was in 1876 by Cope described as being similar to Zapsalis, another tooth taxon, itself often considered synonymous with Richardoestesia, a possible dromaeosaurid. Richardoestesia isosceles would, according to a study by Julia Sankey e.a., be synonymous with the elongated, so-called "Type A", teeth of Paronychodon, to which also the Paronychodon holotype belongs. The Eurasian Euronychodon tooth genus is also sometimes considered a (junior) synonym of Paronychodon.

== See also ==
- Timeline of troodontid research
