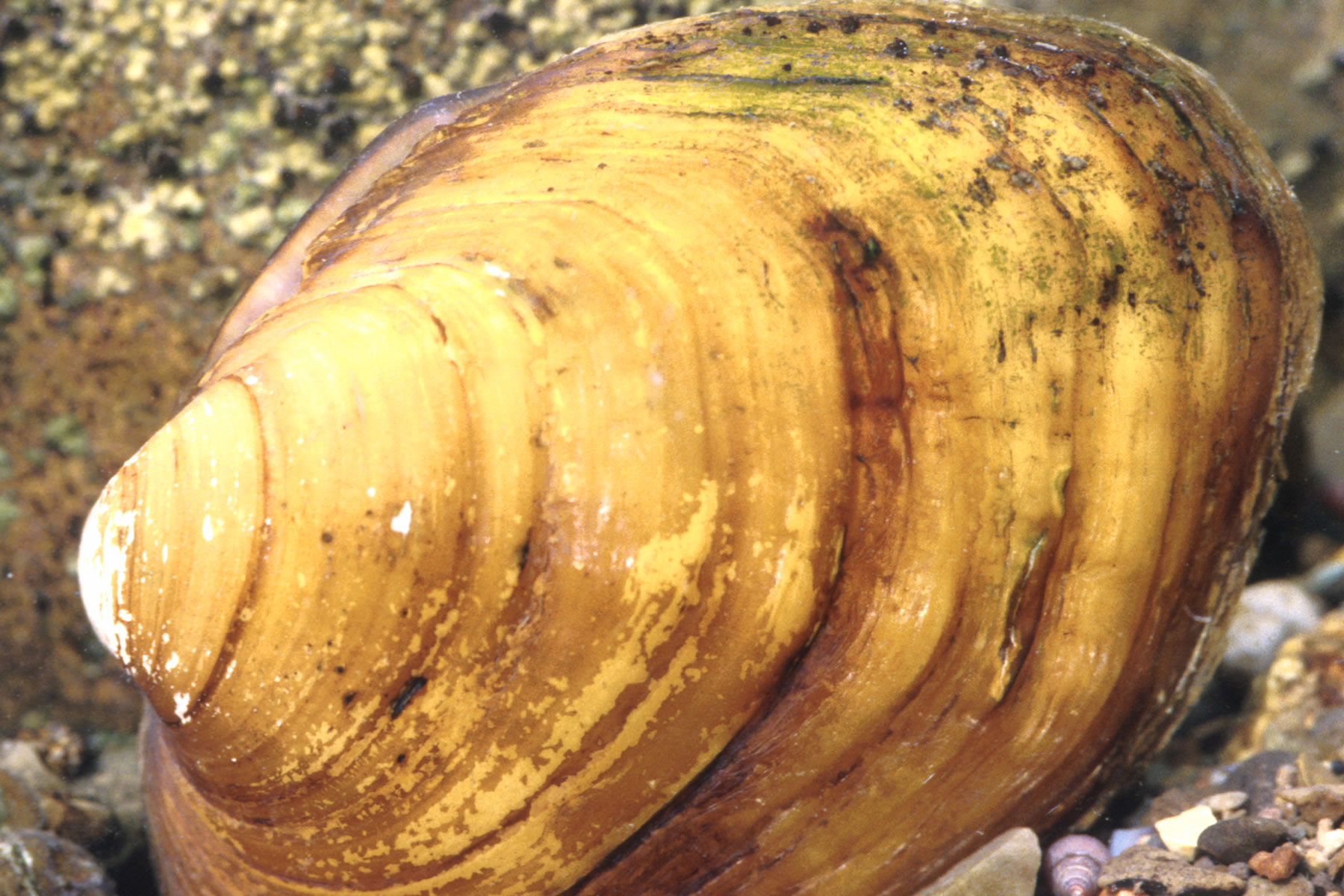
- A live individual of Plethobasus cyphyus

Scientific classification
- Domain: Eukaryota
- Kingdom: Animalia
- Phylum: Mollusca
- Class: Bivalvia
- Order: Unionida
- Family: Unionidae
- Tribe: Pleurobemini
- Genus: Plethobasus; Simpson, 1900

= Plethobasus =

Genus of bivalves

Plethobasus is a genus of freshwater mussels, aquatic bivalve mollusks in the family Unionidae, the river mussels.

== Species ==
Species within the genus Plethobasus include:

- Plethobasus cicatricosus (white warty-back pearly mussel)
- Plethobasus cooperianus (orange-footed pimpleback mussel)
- Plethobasus cyphyus (sheepnose mussel)
