= Essonodon =

Essonodon Temporal range: Late Campanian to Maastrichtian

Scientific classification
- Kingdom: Animalia
- Phylum: Chordata
- Class: Mammalia
- Order: †Multituberculata
- Family: †Cimolomyidae
- Genus: †Essonodon; Simpson, 1927
- Species: †E. browni

Binomial name
- †Essonodon browni Simpson, 1927

Extinct genus of mammals

Essonodon is a mammal genus from the Upper Cretaceous of North America. It was a member of the extinct order Multituberculata and lived towards the end of the "age of the dinosaurs." It is within the suborder Cimolodonta and perhaps the family Cimolomyidae. It contains a single species, Essonodon browni, formerly also known as Cimolodon nitidus (Marsh 1889).

The genus Essonodon was named by Simpson G.G. in 1927, and is also partly known as Cimolodon. The inclusion of this taxon within Cimolomyidae is tentative. (Kielan-Jaworowska & Hurum 2001, p. 408).

Fossils are known from the late Campanian to the end of the Maastrichtian. They are known from the Hell Creek Formation of Montana & North Dakota (USA), the Frenchman Formation of Saskatchewan (Canada), and the Fruitland & Ojo Alamo Formations of New Mexico (USA).

This species was a relatively large multituberculate that weighed around 1.18 kilograms.
