= Wakinyantanka =

Wakinyantanka Temporal range: Upper Cretaceous Maastrichtian

Trace fossil classification
- Kingdom: Animalia
- Phylum: Chordata
- Class: Reptilia
- Clade: Dinosauria
- Clade: Saurischia
- Clade: Theropoda
- Ichnogenus: †Wakinyantanka; Lockley et al., 2014

Type ichnospecies
- †Wakinyantanka styxi Lockley et al., 2014

Trace fossil of dinosaur footprints

Wakinyantanka (from Lakota Wakíŋyaŋ Tȟáŋka, "great thunderbird") is an ichnogenus of footprint produced by a large theropod dinosaur from the Late Cretaceous Hell Creek Formation of South Dakota. Wakinyantanka tracks are large with three long, slender toes with occasional impressions of a short hallux and narrow metatarsals. Wakinyantanka was the first dinosaur track to be discovered in the Hell Creek Formation, which remain rare in the preservational conditions of the rocks. The potential trackmakers may be a large oviraptorosaur or a small (possibly juvenile) tyrannosaurid.

== Discovery and naming ==
The fossil trackway of Wakinyantanka was first discovered in 1997 on the Holsti Ranch in Harding County, South Dakota, and were the first dinosaur footprints to ever be discovered in the Hell Creek Formation. The tracks were recognised as belonging to a new ichnospecies and were reported as such at conferences in 1997 and 1999, but were not officially described and named until 2014 by palaeontologist Martin Lockley together with Michael Triebold and Paul Janke. Only two footprints were initially exposed on the surface, however, the remaining footprints were visible as partially exposed concretions at or near the surface, and excavations uncovered a total of 15 preserved tracks with one inferred track (no. 9) missing from the sequence, likely having been eroded away by a gully that cuts across the trackway site. The two halves of the trackway have been catalogued by the Rocky Mountain Dinosaur Resource Center (RMDRC) as RMDRC97-001-01-08 and RMDRC97-001-10-16.

The tracks are preserved as impressions left in grey claystone (a mudrock) and cast in orange-brown to purplish-black ironstone concretions (siderite) that filled the tracks. Remarkably, these ironstone concretions preserve the tracks as three-dimensional casts of the entire foot, sometimes even including the metatarsals. This mode of preservation is rare in footprints, which typically only preserve the bottom surface, and similar theropod tracks are only known from Burgos, Spain. This also allowed for the track casts to be jacketed in plaster and collected from the field after examination in the manner typical of fossil bones and skeletons. The 3D casts range from "almost perfect" complete casts of the foot to incompletely preserved with shortened or even missing digits, indicating that the surrounding clay collapsed in around some of the prints.

In 2014, Lockley and colleagues named the tracks Wakinyantanka styxi, meaning "great thunder-bird from hell" from Lakota (Wakíŋyaŋ "thunderbird" + Tȟáŋka "great") and Ancient Greek (styx "hell").

Tracks similar to Wakinyantanka have also been discovered in Colorado and Poland, and have been tentatively referred to cf. Wakinyantanka. The latter was originally referred to Irenesauripus, an ichnogenus from Lower Cretaceous North America that shows some similarities in shape to Wakinyantanka.

== Description ==
Wakinyantanka are large, tridactyl, and bipedal pes prints, with the middle (third) toe being the longest (mesaxonic), typical of theropod footprints. The digits of Wakinyantanka are long and slender, and are widely divaricating so that the prints are roughly as wide as they are long, averaging between 55–60 centimetres (22–24 in) long and 60 centimetres (24 in) wide. The digits are long and slender with straight sides, tapering abruptly into narrow pointed claw impressions at their tips. Some Wakinyantanka tracks also preserve impressions of a short and narrow hallux, only 5 centimetres (2.0 in) long and pointed inwards and slightly backwards, and some deeply impressed prints even preserve long and slender metatarsal impressions that can extend the track length to up to 100 centimetres (39 in). Unusually, the prints all appear to lack distinct fleshy toe pads, even in well preserved casts. However, examination of how modern tracks are made in mud suggests that those preserved as three-dimensional casts like Wakinyantanka may have the toe pads obliterated from the print by the foot itself being pulled backwards out of the substrate through the same opening it had entered, rather than being a genuine characteristic. At the same time, the viscosity of the surrounding sediment preserves the prints in high fidelity, such that scale impressions from the top, sides and bottom of the feet are preserved in some tracks.

A unique feature of Wakinyantaka is that the hypex, the point where the flesh outline of two digits join at the base of the foot, is noticeably asymmetrical and reaches much further back between digits II and III than it does between III and IV. This condition is atypical of theropod footprints, and may be a characteristic trait of the trackmaker's foot morphology not knowable from the skeleton alone.

The entire Wakinyantanka trackway is very narrow, barely wider than the footprints themselves and with individual footprints only slightly offset from the midline, leading to high pace angulation values between 170 and 180°.

== Trackmaker identity ==
Wakinyantanka was made by a large theropod dinosaur, although the exact identity of the producer is unclear. Based on its functionally three toed and hallux impressions, Lockley and colleagues ruled out deinonychosaurs and ornithomimids as probable trackmakers. Wakinyantanka is superficially similar to Saurexallopus, an ichnogenus that has been suggested to belong to oviraptorosaurs. However, Saurexallopus typically have larger halluces than Wakinyantanka, and the hypex of Saurexallopus is reversed compared to Wakinyantanka (deeper between digits III and IV, not II and III). The only remaining contemporary theropod candidates are tyrannosaurids, though the tracks are too small to have been made by an adult Tyrannosaurus, and were suggested by Lockley and colleagues to have been made by an animal similar to a small albertosaurine tyrannosaurid or Nanotyrannus (a genus formerly recognized as representing juvenile Tyrannosaurus but now confirmed as valid).

== Palaeobiology ==
Based on the step-length of the trackway and the estimated hip height of the trackmaker, the animal that produced the Wakinyantanka trackway was calculated to have been moving at roughly 2.15 metres per second, or 7.7 kilometres per hour (4.8 mph). This estimation may be slower than the animal's typical walking speed, as it was travelling through soft substrate that its feet sunk into as it walked (up to 30 cm). The deep metatarsal impressions may alternatively be indicative of a crouched, stalking behaviour. The undisturbed three-dimensional preservation of the footprint casts indicate that the animal pulled its foot up and backwards from the substrate, rather than lifting them forward as typical of theropod locomotion. Lockley and colleagues noted this as particularly unusual as the trackway shows an otherwise normal walking progression. This action may be related to the soft, deep substrate it was walking through, although a similar action has been described for the tyrannosaurid track Bellatoripes, as well as the three-dimensional theropod tracks from Spain.
