= Paressonodon =

Paressonodon Temporal range: Late Maastrichtian, 69–66 Ma

Scientific classification
- Domain: Eukaryota
- Kingdom: Animalia
- Phylum: Chordata
- Class: Mammalia
- Order: †Multituberculata
- Family: †Neoplagiaulacidae
- Genus: †Paressonodon; Wilson et al., 2010

Extinct genus of mammals

Paressonodon is an extinct genus of multituberculate which existed in western North America during the end of the Cretaceous period. It contains the species Paressonodon nelsoni. Fossils are known from the Laramie Formation of Colorado and the Lance Formation of Wyoming.
