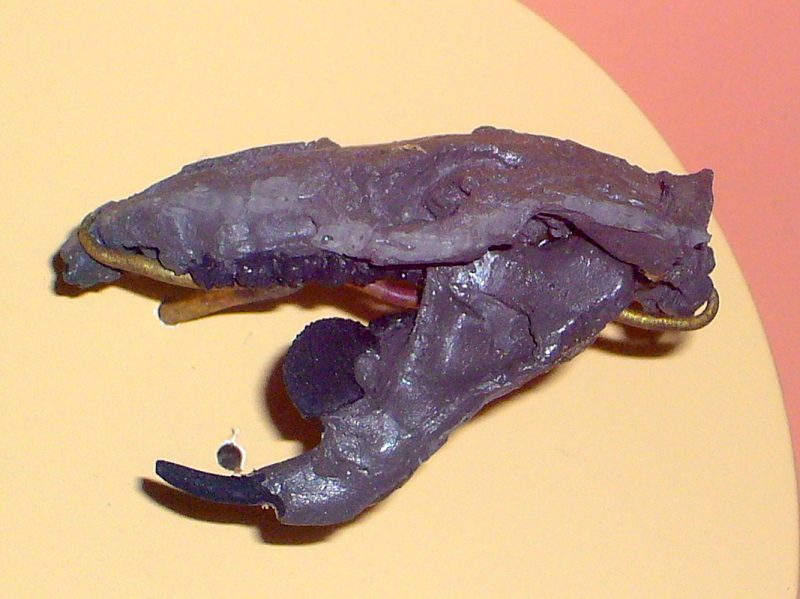
- Skull cast of C. gracilis

Scientific classification
- Kingdom: Animalia
- Phylum: Chordata
- Class: Mammalia
- Order: †Multituberculata
- Family: †Cimolomyidae
- Genus: †Cimolomys; Marsh, 1889

Type species
- †Cimolomys gracilis Marsh, 1889

Species
- C. clarki; C. gracilis; C. milliensis; C. trochuus

= Cimolomys =

Cimolomys Temporal range: Late Santonian to Maastrichtian, 84–66 Ma

Extinct genus of mammals

Cimolomys (Greek for "chalk mouse") is a mammal genus from the Upper Cretaceous of North America. It was a member of the extinct order Multituberculata within the suborder Cimolodonta and family Cimolomyidae.

The genus Cimolomys was named by Othniel Charles Marsh in 1889.

== Distribution ==
Remains of Cimolomys are widespread throughout the interior west of North America (the former landmass of Laramidia) throughout the Late Cretaceous, from the late Santonian to the end of the Maastrichtian. However, a few rare remains from concurrent formations in eastern North America (indeterminate remains from the Bladen Formation of North Carolina and Marshalltown Formation of New Jersey, the latter tentatively assigned to the western species C. clarki) suggest they were also found on the other side of the Western Interior Seaway, on the landmass of Appalachia.

== Species ==
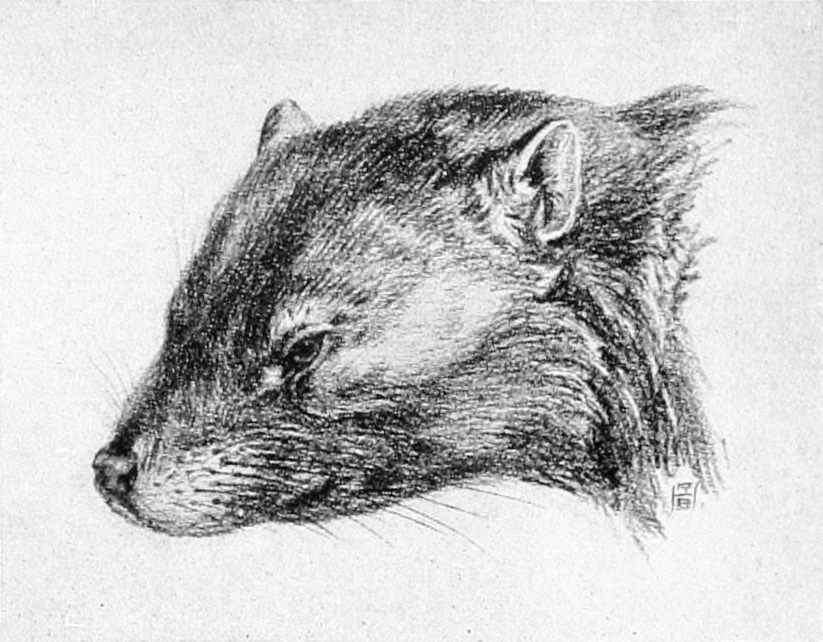
Restoration of C. gracilis

The species Cimolomys clarki was named by Sahni in 1972. Fossil remains were found in Campanian-Maastrichtian (Upper Cretaceous) strata of Texas and Wyoming (United States). Possible remains have also come from New Jersey (USA). It probably weighed about 300 g, the same as a malnourished rat.

The species Cimolomys gracilis was named by Marsh O.C. in 1889, and has also been known as Cimolomys digona (Marsh 1889); Meniscoessus brevis; Ptilodus gracilus (Osborn H.F. 1893); and Selenacodon brevis (Marsh 1889). Remains were found in Maastrichtian (Upper Cretaceous) strata of Montana, South Dakota and Wyoming (USA) and Saskatchewan, Canada. This species likely weighed around 415 g, as much as a modern rat.

The species Cimolomys milliensis was named by Eaton J.G. in 1993.. Remains were found in Campanian (Upper Cretaceous) strata of Mill Creek, Utah (USA).

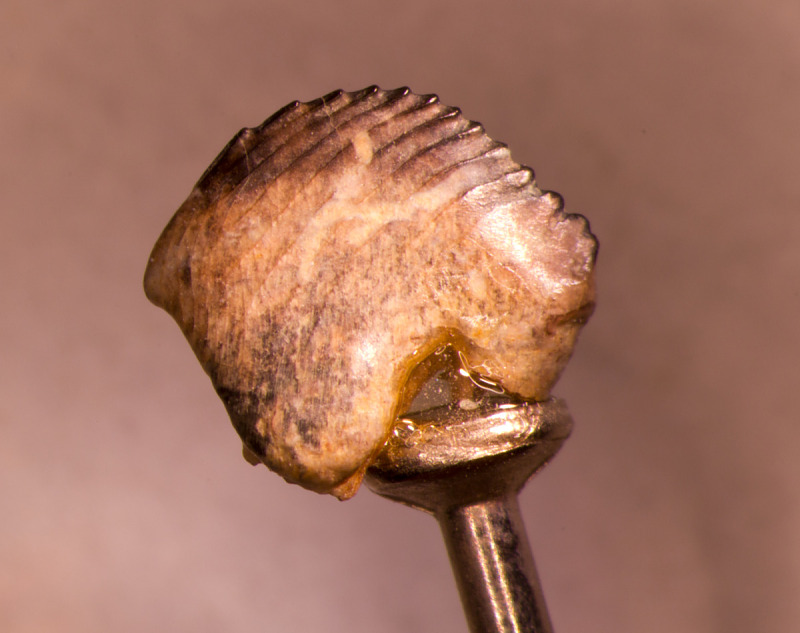
Tooth of C. sp.

The species Cimolomys trochuus was named by Lillegraven J.A. in 1969. Remains were found in Maastrichtian (Upper Cretaceous) strata of North America. The holotype is in the collection of the University of Alberta.
