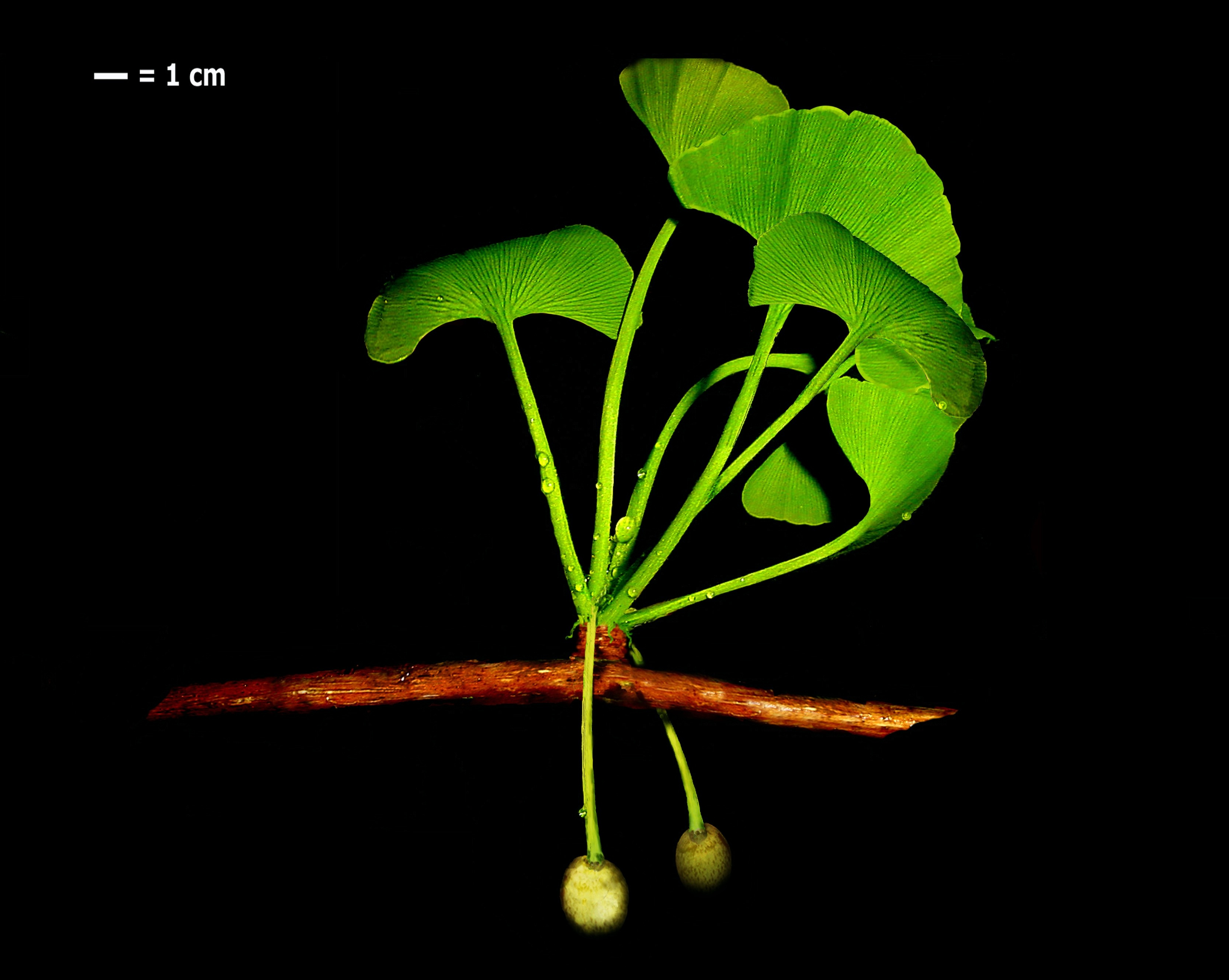
- reconstruction

Scientific classification
- Kingdom: Plantae
- Clade: Tracheophytes
- Clade: Gymnospermae
- Division: Ginkgophyta
- Class: Ginkgoopsida
- Order: Ginkgoales
- Family: Ginkgoaceae
- Genus: Ginkgo
- Species: †G. adiantoides

Binomial name
- †Ginkgo adiantoides (Unger) Heer

= Ginkgo adiantoides =

Extinct species of tree

Ginkgo adiantoides is an extinct ginkgo species in the family Ginkgoaceae from the Late Cretaceous to the Miocene.

Evolutionary history is unresolved. Morphological and molecular data show a wide range of possible relationships with cycads and conifers.

Ginkgo leaves were borne on both long and short shoots on lateral branches of the main stem. They are recognized by their distinctive leaf shape and open dichotomous venation pattern. Ginkogoales are spermatophytes, belong to the lignophyte clade, and are euphyllophytes.

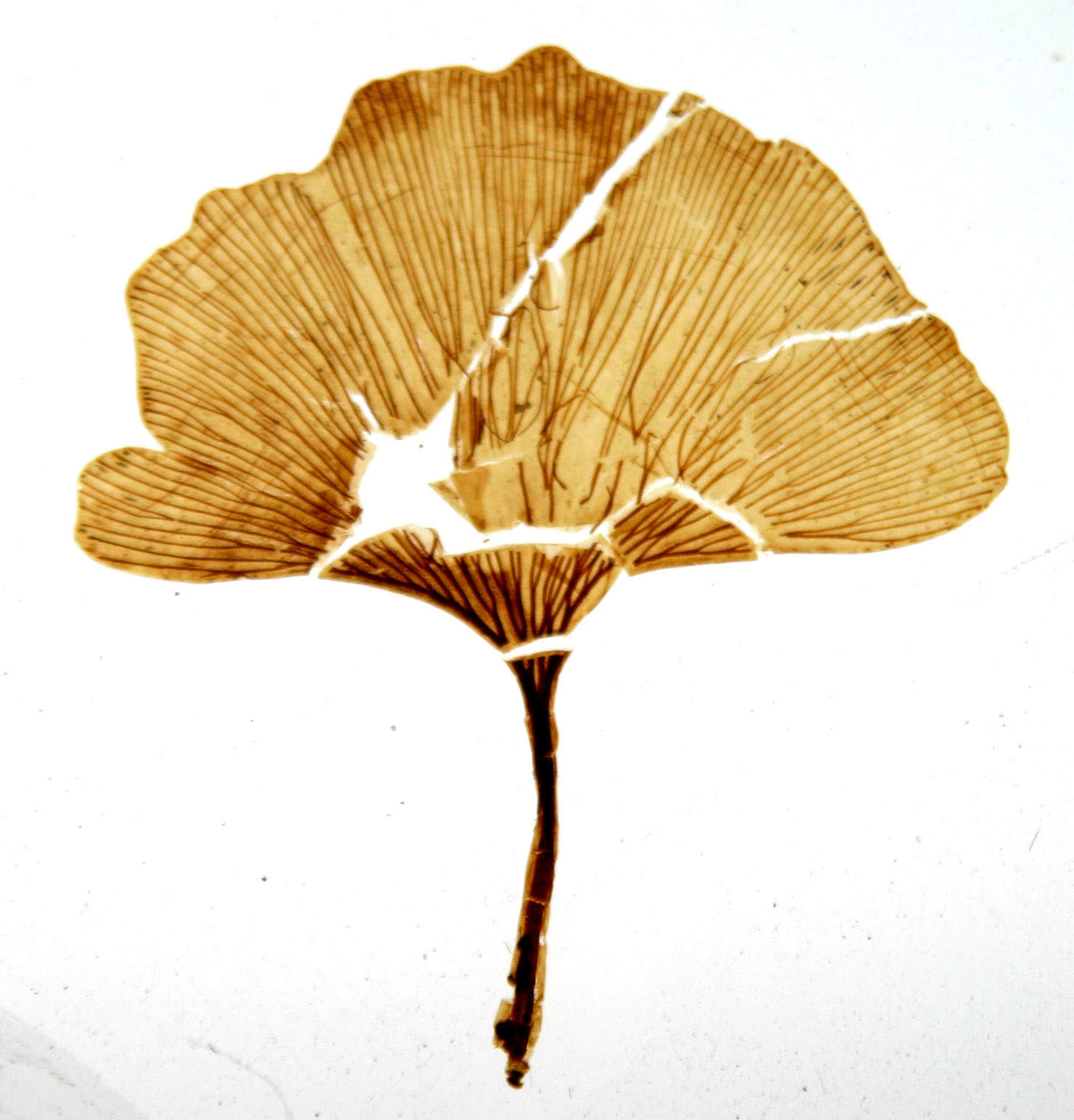
Ginkgo adiantoides 1

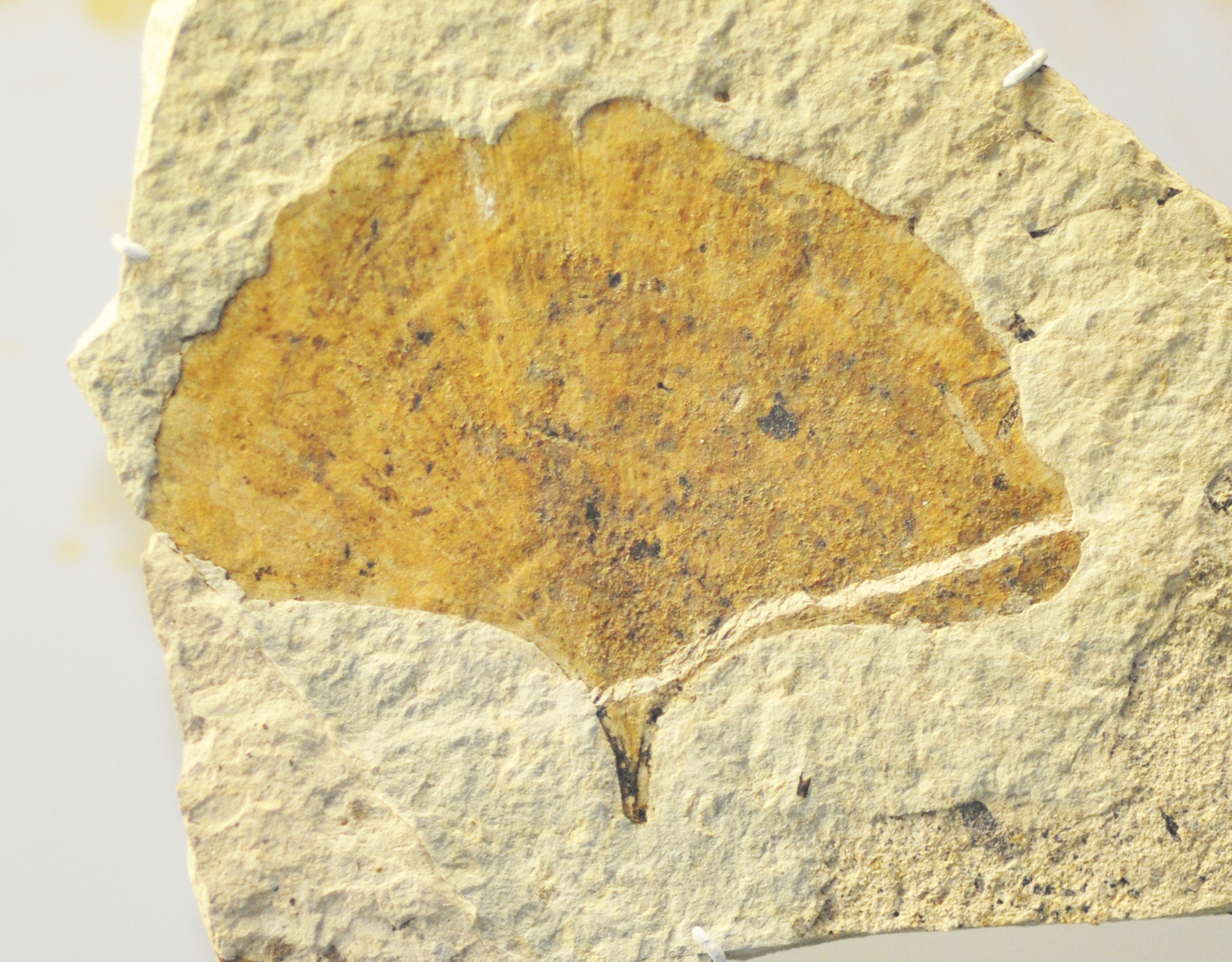
Ginkgo adiantoides 2

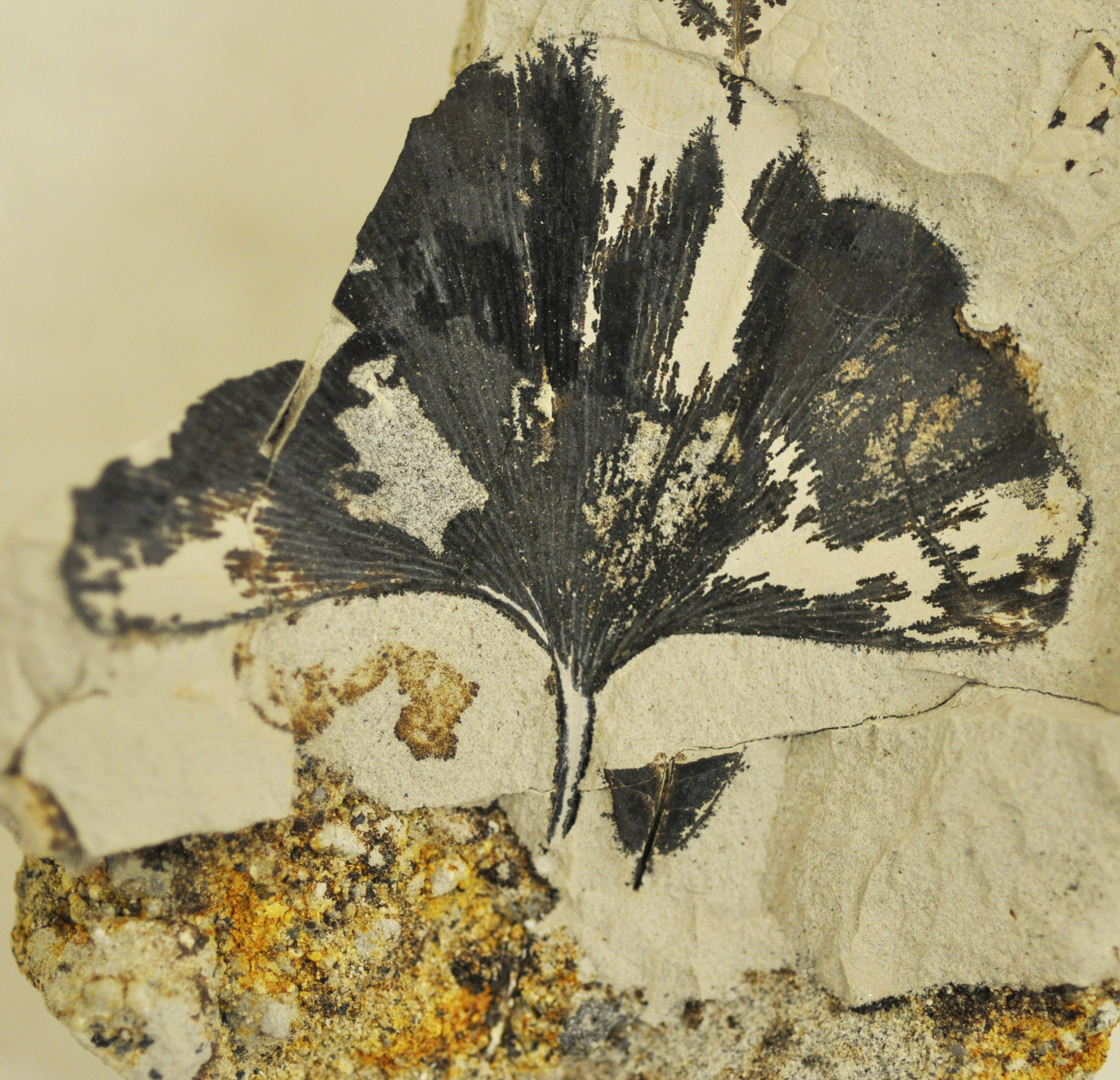
Ginkgo adiantoides 3
