= Piceoerpeton =

Piceoerpeton Temporal range: Maastrichtian-Eocene

Scientific classification
- Kingdom: Animalia
- Phylum: Chordata
- Class: Amphibia
- Order: Urodela
- Family: †Scapherpetontidae
- Genus: †Piceoerpeton; Meszoely, 1967

Species
- †Piceoerpeton naylori; †Piceoerpeton willwoodense

Extinct genus of salamanders

Piceoerpeton is an extinct genus of prehistoric amphibian, containing species known from the latest Cretaceous (late Maastrichtian), Paleocene and Eocene of North America. It is one of the largest known salamanders at 1.8 metres, and would have approached the cryptobranchid Andrias in size. However, Piceoerpeton is unrelated to the Cryptobranchidae; instead it appears to be a member of the extinct family Scapherpetontidae.

== Species ==
P. naylori is the smaller, earlier species, being found in Maastrichtian to early Paleocene strata of Wyoming and Montana. P. willwoodense is the larger, younger species, being found in late Paleocene strata of the Western Interior, and early Eocene strata of the Canadian Arctic.

== See also ==
- List of prehistoric amphibians
