= Rossignon =

Rossignon may refer to:

- Christophe Rossignon, French producer, actor
- Georges Rossignon (1900–1974), French boxer
- Jules Rossignon (died 1883), French professor, writer, scientific agriculturist, international coffee grower
