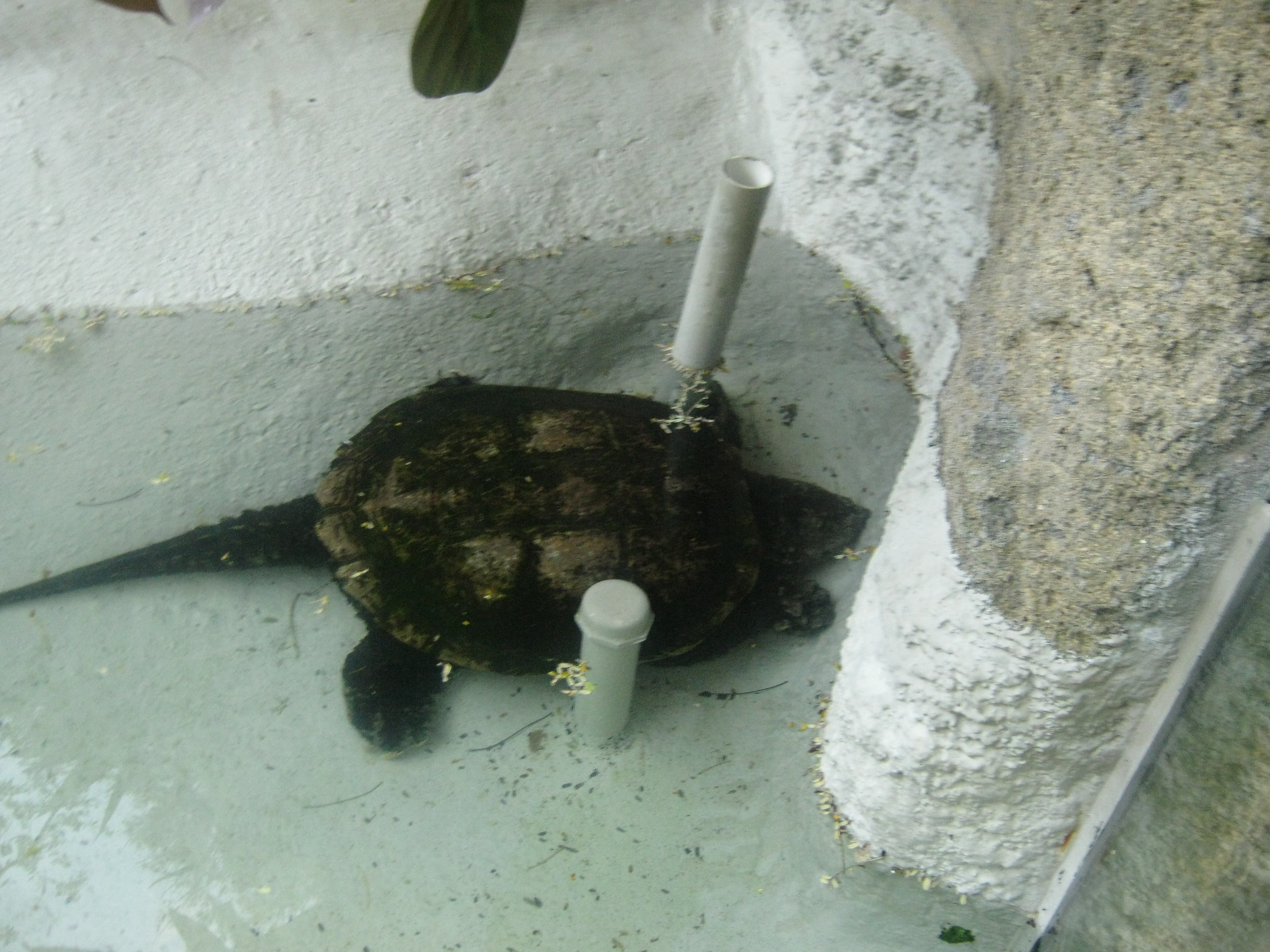
- A South American snapping turtle in the Cali Zoo

Conservation status
- Near Threatened (IUCN 3.1)

Scientific classification
- Kingdom: Animalia
- Phylum: Chordata
- Class: Reptilia
- Order: Testudines
- Suborder: Cryptodira
- Family: Chelydridae
- Genus: Chelydra
- Species: C. acutirostris

Binomial name
- Chelydra acutirostris W. Peters, 1862

Synonyms
- Chelydra serpentina var. acutirostris W. Peters, 1862; Chelydra acutirostris — Babcock, 1932; Chelydra angustirostris Dunn, 1945 (ex errore)

= South American snapping turtle =

Species of turtle

The South American snapping turtle (Chelydra acutirostris) is a species of turtle in the family Chelydridae. This species, which is endemic to Central and northwestern South America, was previously considered a subspecies of C. serpentina. Its restricted range in South America reflects its recent arrival there as part of the Great American Interchange.

== Geographic range ==
Chelydra acutirostris is found in Honduras, Nicaragua, Costa Rica, Panama, Colombia, Ecuador, and Peru.

== Subspecies ==
No subspecies of C. acutirostris are recognized.

== Conservation ==
On July 9 2026, the South American snapping turtle was evaluated as Near Threatened and its populations are starting to be decreasing by the IUCN Red List.
