= San José la Colonia =

National park in Alta Verapaz, Guatemala

San José la Colonia National Park
- Location within Guatemala
- Location: Alta Verapaz, Guatemala
- Coordinates: 15°28′42″N 90°22′28″W
- Area: 0.54 km^{2} (0.21 sq mi)
- Elevation: 1,345 m (4,413 ft)
- Established: Acuerdo Gubernativo 04-76
- Visitors: allowed
- Operator: INAB

San José la Colonia is located in Alta Verapaz, Guatemala, on the northern outskirts of the city of Cobán (15.478441°N 90.374483°W). Formerly a nationalized finca, San José la Colonia was designated a national park in 1976. The park covers an area of 54 ha, and is managed by the National Forestry Institute (INAB).
