= Cobán =

Cobán Kob'an (Kekchí)
- Municipality
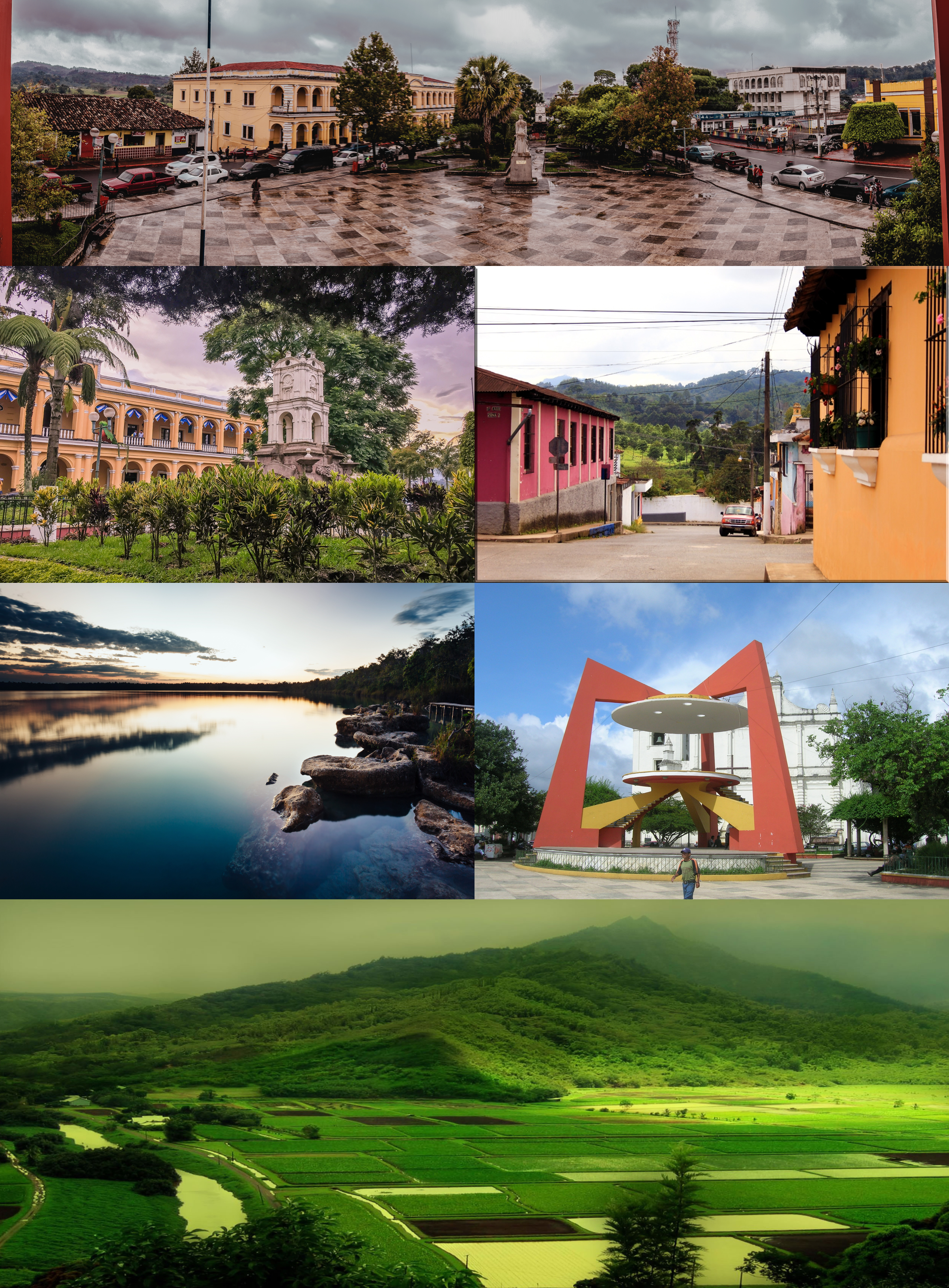
- Above, from left to right: Central Park of Cobán, Governing Palace, City Streets, Lachuá Lagoon, Santo Domingo de Guzmán Cathedral and the biodiversity in Cobán.

- Flag Coat of arms

- Location within Guatemala Location within Alta Verapaz Department
- Coordinates: 15°29′0″N 90°22′0″W
- Country: Guatemala
- Department: Alta Verapaz
- Founded: August 4, 1543

Government
  - Mayor: Koky Córdova (LDR)

Area
  - Municipality: 1,974 km^{2} (762 sq mi)
- Elevation: 1,320 m (4,330 ft)

Population (2023)
  - Municipality: 237,572
  - Rank: 5th
  - Urban: 212,047
- Time zone: GMT -6
- Postal code: 16001
- Climate: Cwb/Cfb

Cobán (Kekchí: Kob'an), fully Santo Domingo de Cobán, is the capital of the department of Alta Verapaz in central Guatemala. It also serves as the administrative center for the surrounding Cobán municipality. It is located 219 km from Guatemala City.

As of the 2018 census, the population of the city of Cobán was 212,047 and that of the municipality was 212,421. Cobán lies at an altitude of 1,320 metres or 4,330 feet above sea level and covers a total area of 1,974 km^{2}. It is located at the center of a major coffee-growing area.

== History ==
=== Order of Preachers in the Vera Paz ===
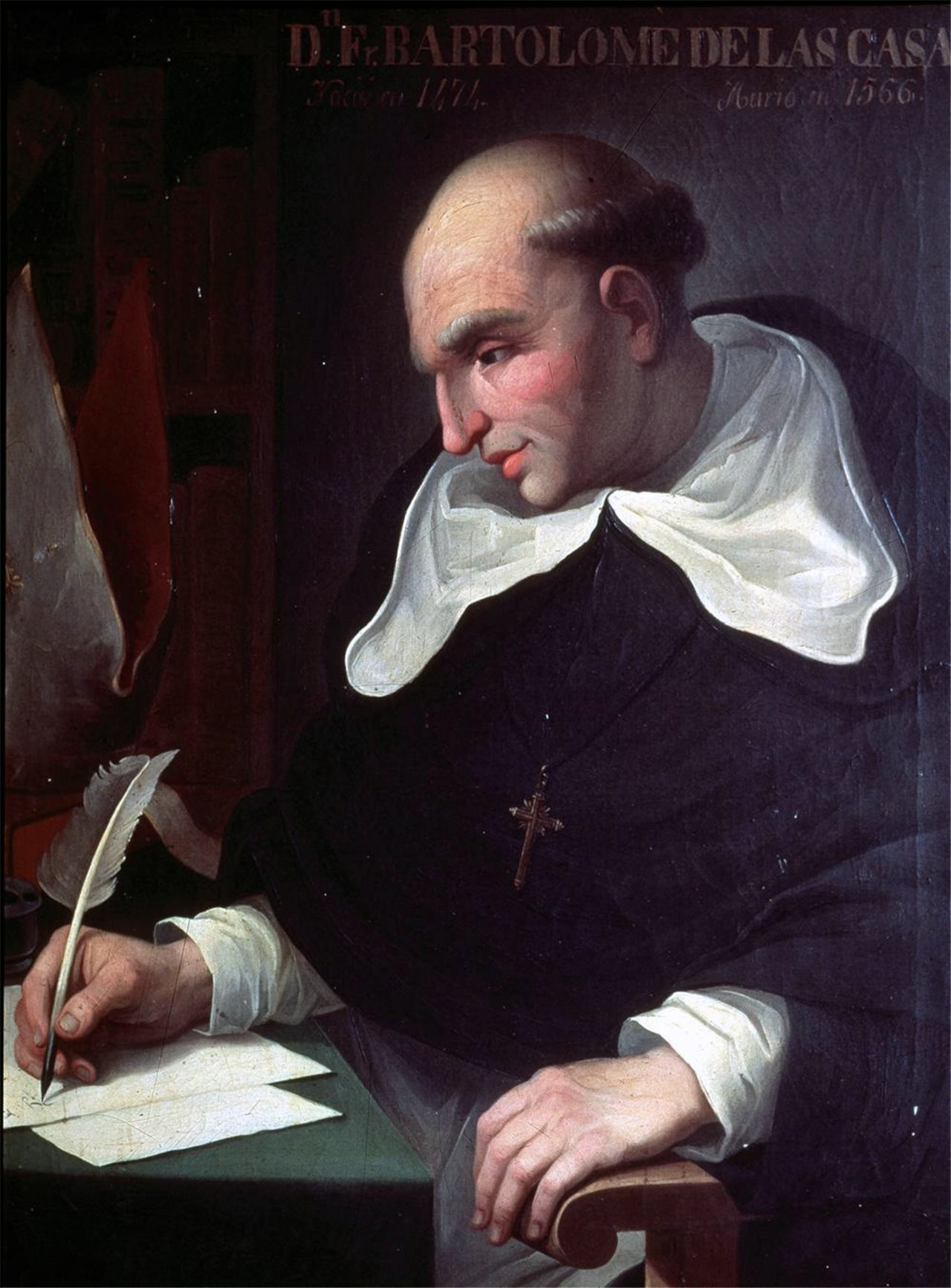
Fray Bartolomé de las Casas, O.P. who along friars Rodrigo de Landa, Pedro Angulo and Luis de Cáncer, O.P, started Vera paz Christian indoctrination in 1542.

Between 1530 and 1531, captain Alonso de Ávila on his way to Ciudad Real accidentally discovered the lagoon and hill of Lacam-Tún. People of that place had historically traded with all the people that the Spaniards had conquered, so, knowing what was coming, they sought refuge in the jungle. The Spaniards tried in vain to conquer the lacandones: from Nueva España Juan Enríquez de Guzman tried; from the Yucatán Peninsula, Francisco de Montejo tried; Pedro de Alvarado attempted it from Guatemala along with captain Francisco Gil Zapata and, finally, Pedro Solórzano from Chiapas. That is when the Order of Preachers tried to convert the Tezulutlán "War Zone" into a peaceful region.

In the meantime, after a series of setbacks in La Española, the island Audiencia allowed Bartolomé de las Casas to accept Friar Tomás de Berlanga's invitation to go to Nueva Granada in 1534, where he had just been appointed as Bishop. Both sailed toward Panama, to then continued to Lima, but during the trip a storm tossed their ship to Nicaragua, where Las Casas chose to remain in the Granada convent. in 1535, he proposed to the King and the Council of the Indies to start a peaceful colonization of the unexplored rural zones in the Guatemala region; however, in spite of Bernal Díaz de Luco and Mercado de Peñaloza intentions to help him, his suggestion was rejected. In 1536 Nicaraguan governor Rodrigo de Contreras organized a military expedition, but Las Casas was able to postpone it by a couple of years after he notified queen Isabel de Portugal, wife of Carlos V. Given the authorities' hostility, Las Casas left Nicaragua and went to Guatemala.

In November 1536, Las Casas settled in Santiago de Guatemala, then the capital of Guatemala; a few months later, his friend, bishop Juan Garcés, invited him to move to Tlascala, but after a few weeks he came back to Guatemala. On May 2, 1537, governor Alonso de Maldonado granted him the Tezulutlán Capitulations - a written commitment ratified on July 6, 1539, by Antonio de Mendoza, México Viceroy- in which everybody agreed that Tezulutlán natives, once conquered, would not be given as encomienda but would be King's subjects. Las Casas, along with friars Rodrigo de Landa, Pedro Angulo and Luis de Cancer, looked for four Christian natives and taught them Christian hymns where the Gospel's basic principles were explained. Luis de Cancer visited the cacique of Sacapulas and was able to perform the first baptisms among his people. Later, Las Casas lead a retinue to bring girts to the cacique, who was so impressed that he decided to convert and become his people preacher. The cacique was baptized with the name of Don Juan and the natives granted permission to build a small church; however, Cobán, another cacique, burned the church. Don Juan, along sixty men, Las Casas and Pedro Angulo, went to talk to Cobán's people and convinced them of their good intentions; Don Juan even took the initiative to marry one of his daughters with cacique Cobán by the Catholic Church.

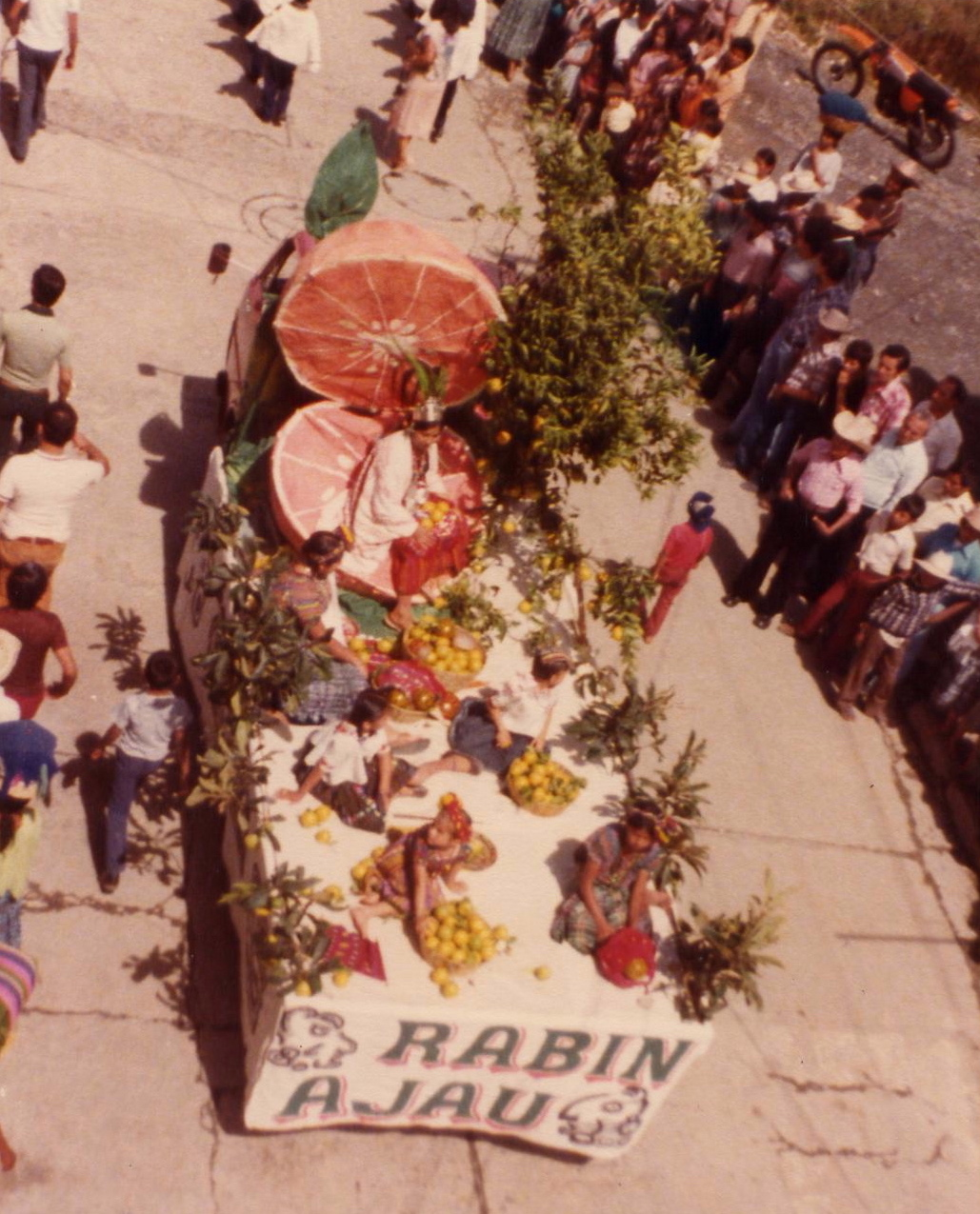
"Rabin Ahau" festival 1980

In 1539 pope Paul III authorized the diocese of Ciudad Real; (Note: Ciudad Real diocesis included Chiapas, Soconusco, la Vera Paz (including the Lacandon jungle), Tabasco and the still non-conquered Yucatán Peninsula.) that year, Alonso de Maldonado—under pressure by Spanish settlers—began a military campaign in Tezulutlán [...] gave all the natives in encomiendas. This flagrant violation of the Capitulations enraged Las Casas, who traveled to Spain to denounce it before king Charles V. On January 9, 1540, a royal document was issues which the Tezulutlán Capitulations were ratified and gave the region to the protection of the Order of Preachers. On October 17 of that year, Cardinal García de Loaysa -then president of the Indias Council- ordered the México Audiencia to comply with these laws. The Capitulations were officially published on January 21, 1541, in the church of Sevilla.

Las Casas was appointed bishop of Chiapas in 1544, but he tried to apply the new ways in his diocese, they were flatly rejected by the encomenderos. In 1545, Guatemala bishop Francisco Marroquín visited Tezulutlán and met with the preachers. Back in the city of Gracias a Dios, where the Audiencia de los Confines had its main office- met with Las Casas and with Nicaragua bishop Antonio de Valdivieso. There was a lot of tension between Marroquín and Las Casas in this meeting (Note: Las Casas accused Marroquín of having slave Indians and to have a repartimiento along with preaching "toxic doctrine"; Marroquín on the other hand, accused Las Casas of going beyond his jurisdiction.) The conflict moved on to Ciudad de México and finally everybody agreed to favor the freedom of the natives; however, this could not be accomplished for the Lacandon Jungle would not be conquered for another two century, becoming the rebel maya people favorite hideout.

Las Casas and Angulo founded Rabinal, and the city of Cobán was the center of the new Catholic doctrine. A few years later, the natives started settling following the Spanish model and several towns were settled, like Tactic. The name "War zone" was change for "Vera Paz" (true peace), name that became official in 1547. Cobán received the title of an imperial city by Charles V, Holy Roman Emperor and in 1599 Cobán became bishop's see. It was briefly known during this period as Ciudad Imperial (Spanish for "Imperial City") in Charles's honor.

=== Independence and German settlers ===
As of 1850, Cobán population was estimated to be at 12000. Ca. 1890, British archeologist Alfred Percival Maudslay and his wife moved to Guatemala, and visited Cobán. Around the time the Maudslays visited Verapaz, a German colony had settled in the area thanks to generous concessions granted by liberal presidents Manuel Lisandro Barillas Bercián, José María Reyna Barrios and Manuel Estrada Cabrera. The Germans had a very united and solid community and had several activities in the German Club (Deutsche Verein), in Cobán, which they had founded in 1888. Their main commercial activity was coffee plantations. Maudslay described the Germans like this: "There is a larger proportion of foreigners in Coban than in any other town in the Republic: they are almost exclusively Germans engaged in coffee-planting, and some few of them in cattle-ranching and other industries; although complaints of isolation and of housekeeping and labour troubles are not unheard of amongst them, they seemed to me to be fortunate from a business point of view in the high reputation that the Vera Paz coffee holds in the market, and the very considerable commercial importance which their industry and foresight has brought to the district; and, from a personal point of view, in the enjoyment of a delicious climate in which their rosy-cheeked children can be reared in health and strength, and in all the comforts which pertain to a life half European and half tropical. Hotels or fondas appear to be scarce; but the hospitality of the foreign residents is proverbial."

Cobán in the 1890s

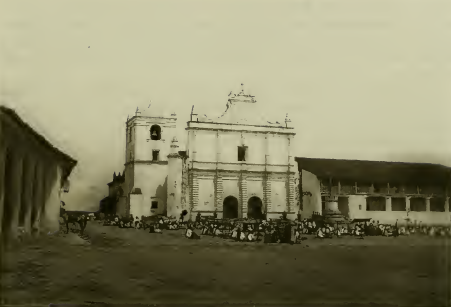
Central park church

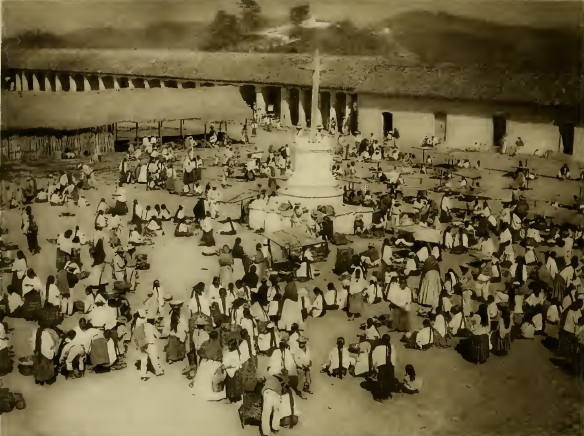
Street market

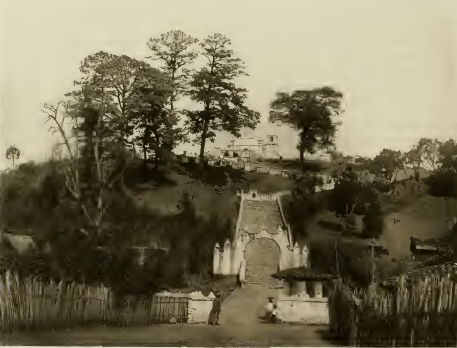
Calvary church

During the presidency of general José María Reina Barrios, British anthropologist Alfred Percival Maudslay and his wife visited Cobán and published these photographs in their book A Glimpse at Guatemala.

The city was developed by German coffee growers towards the end of the 19th century and was operated as a largely independent dominion until WWII. In 1888 a German club was founded and in 1935 a German school opened its doors in Cobán. Until 1930, about 2000 Germans populated the city. In 1941, all Germans were expelled by the Guatemalan government, led at the time by Jorge Ubico because of pressure from the United States; it has also been suggested Ubico's motivation was to seize control of the vast amounts of land Germans owned in the area. Many ended up in internment camps in Texas and were later traded for American POW's held in Germany. A sizable resident German population persists though most having been completely assimilated into the Guatemalan culture through intermarriage. Multiple German architectonic elements can still be appreciated throughout Cobán.

The Germans also set up Ferrocarril Verapaz, a railway which connected Cobán with Lake Izabal, operated from 1895 until 1963 and was a symbol for the wealth in this coffee-growing region those days.

=== Franja Transversal del Norte ===
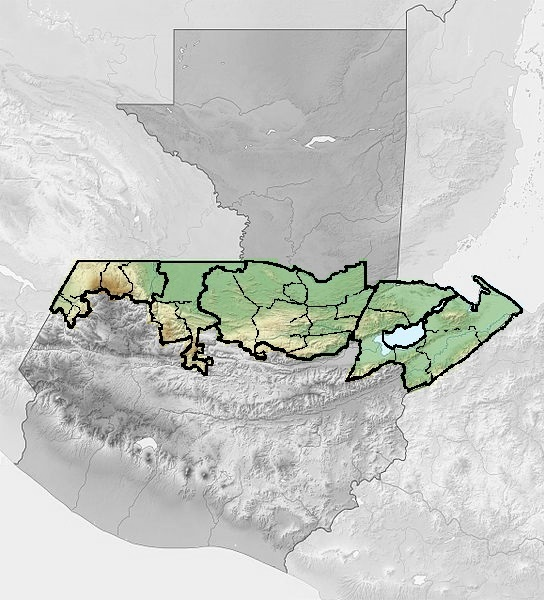
Location of Cobán in Franja Transversal del Norte

The Northern Transverse Strip was officially created during the government of General Carlos Arana Osorio in 1970, by Legislative Decree 60–70, for agricultural development. The decree literally said: "It is of public interest and national emergency, the establishment of Agrarian Development Zones in the area included within the municipalities: San Ana Huista, San Antonio Huista, Nentón, Jacaltenango, San Mateo Ixtatán, and Santa Cruz Barillas in Huehuetenango; Chajul and San Miguel Uspantán in Quiché; Cobán, Chisec, San Pedro Carchá, Lanquín, Senahú, Cahabón and Chahal, in Alta Verapaz and the entire department of Izabal."

=== 21st century: African oil palm ===
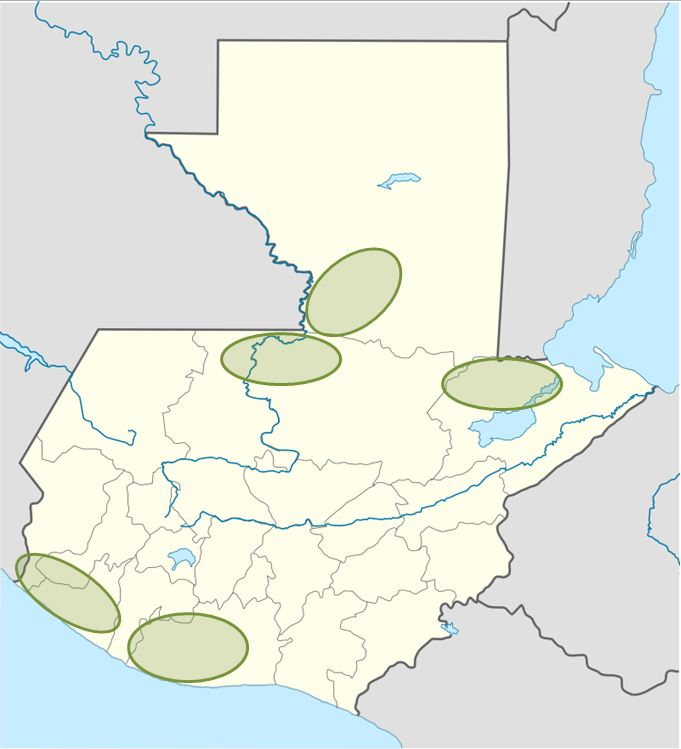
African oil palm plantation areas in Guatemala as of 2014

There is a large demand within Guatemala and some of its neighbors for edible oils and fats, which would explain how the African oil palm became so prevalent in the country in detriment of other oils, and which has allowed new companies associated to large capitals in a new investment phase that can be found particularly in some territories that form the Northern Transversal Strip of Guatemala. The investors are trying to turn Guatemala into one of the main palm oil exporters, in spite of the decline on its international price. The most active region is found in Chisec and Cobán, in Alta Verapaz Department; Ixcán in Quiché Department, and Sayaxché, Petén Department, where Palmas del Ixcán, S.A. (PALIX) is located, both with its own plantation and those of subcontractors. Another active region is that of Fray Bartolomé de las Casas and Chahal in Alta Verapaz Department; El Estor and Livingston, Izabal Department; and San Luis, Petén, where Naturaceites operates.

== Climate ==
Cobán has a subtropical climate highland (Köppen: Cfb).

Climate data for Cobán (1991–2020)
Month	Jan	Feb	Mar	Apr	May	Jun	Jul	Aug	Sep	Oct	Nov	Dec	Year
Record high °C (°F)	34.4 (93.9)	34.7 (94.5)	35.4 (95.7)	36.0 (96.8)	36.0 (96.8)	35.0 (95.0)	32.6 (90.7)	32.0 (89.6)	31.0 (87.8)	34.8 (94.6)	30.9 (87.6)	30.8 (87.4)	36.0 (96.8)
Mean daily maximum °C (°F)	22.3 (72.1)	23.9 (75.0)	25.7 (78.3)	27.8 (82.0)	27.8 (82.0)	27.5 (81.5)	26.5 (79.7)	26.9 (80.4)	27.0 (80.6)	24.9 (76.8)	22.7 (72.9)	22.4 (72.3)	25.4 (77.7)
Daily mean °C (°F)	16.9 (62.4)	17.8 (64.0)	19.0 (66.2)	20.8 (69.4)	21.2 (70.2)	21.0 (69.8)	20.5 (68.9)	20.4 (68.7)	20.5 (68.9)	19.7 (67.5)	17.9 (64.2)	17.3 (63.1)	19.4 (66.9)
Mean daily minimum °C (°F)	10.8 (51.4)	11.0 (51.8)	11.3 (52.3)	12.6 (54.7)	13.8 (56.8)	14.6 (58.3)	14.1 (57.4)	14.0 (57.2)	14.4 (57.9)	13.8 (56.8)	12.5 (54.5)	11.5 (52.7)	12.9 (55.2)
Record low °C (°F)	2.6 (36.7)	3.8 (38.8)	4.4 (39.9)	3.1 (37.6)	4.9 (40.8)	6.8 (44.2)	8.0 (46.4)	8.6 (47.5)	6.3 (43.3)	6.4 (43.5)	2.2 (36.0)	3.0 (37.4)	2.2 (36.0)
Average precipitation mm (inches)	39.4 (1.55)	40.3 (1.59)	42.3 (1.67)	70.6 (2.78)	185.4 (7.30)	265.0 (10.43)	219.1 (8.63)	238.7 (9.40)	289.1 (11.38)	300.3 (11.82)	232.6 (9.16)	69.8 (2.75)	1,992.6 (78.46)
Average precipitation days (≥ 1.0 mm)	12.6	6.1	8.6	8.1	14.4	19.8	20.3	19.6	21.5	19.9	15.7	12.8	182.4
Source: NOAA

== Culture ==
Each year at the end of July, a festival of Guatemala's native peoples is held here, La Fiesta Nacional Indígena de Guatemala (Festival Folklórico). The festivities include a beauty contest for Guatemala's indigenous women, the winner of which is crowned with the title "Rabin Ahau", which means "the Daughter of the King" in Q'eqchi'. The dominant ethnicity here is Q'eqchi' Mayan and the language of Q'eqchi' is widely spoken in town, especially in and around the markets where farmers from the surrounding hills sell their products. The departmental fair is held in Cobán and begins on the last Sunday in July and continues for a week. Every year, the international half-marathon of Cobán is held during the month of May; 4,000 runners gather in Cobán to take part of the event that has become the landmark event for the region. The annual religious festival (fiesta titular) is on August 4 and dedicated to Santo Domingo de Guzman.

== Sports ==
Cobán Imperial Football Club is one of the traditional clubs of Guatemala and became Guatemala League champions for the first time in 2004. The club plays in the Guatemalan national league. They play their home games in the Estadio Verapaz. Cobán is also known for their basketball history. The youth leagues are the best in the country.

== Tourism ==
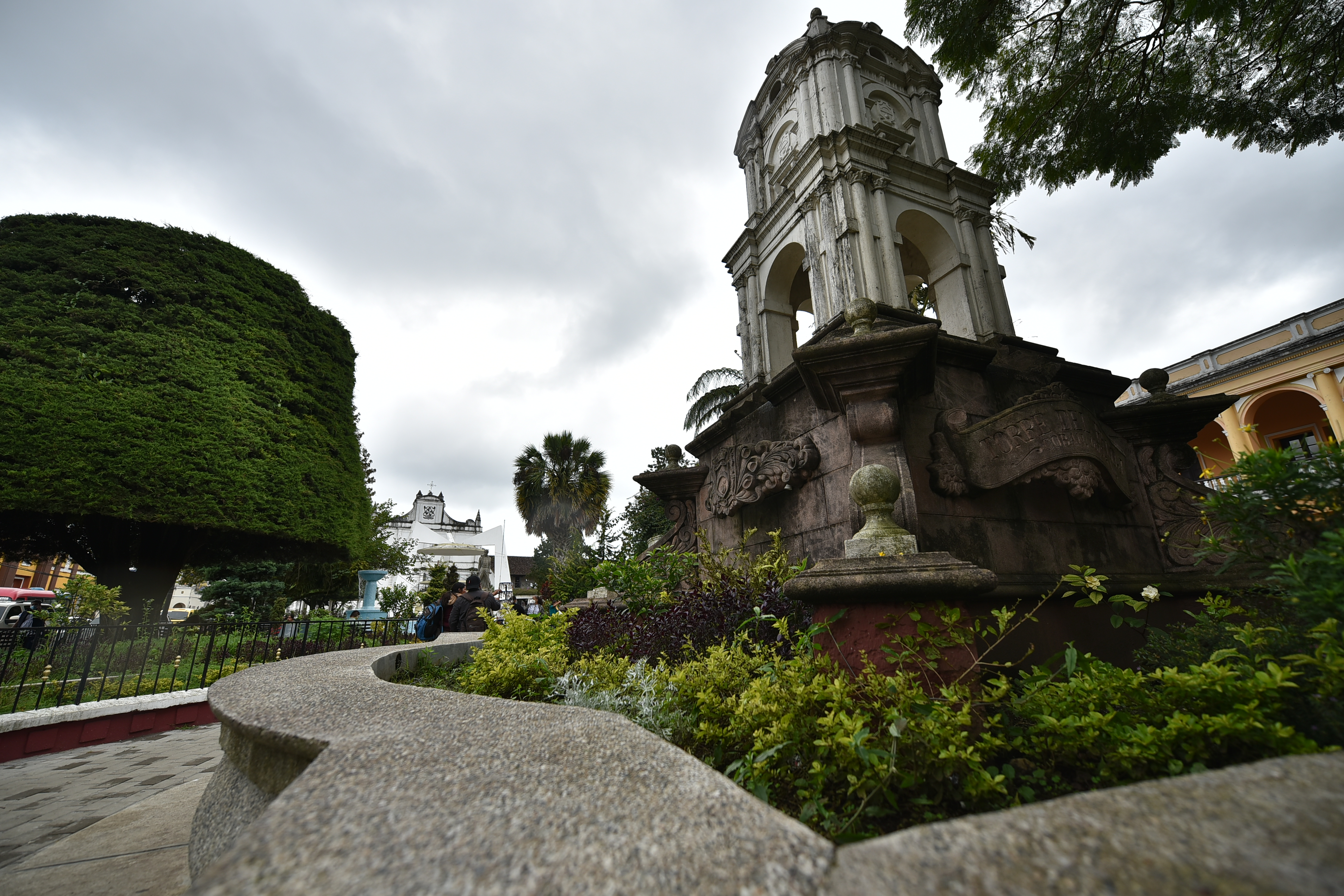
Central Park in Cobán

Cobán is surrounded by mountains laden with orchids. The rare Monja blanca orchid is the departmental symbol. Nature reserves in or near Cobán include Las Victorias National Park, San José la Colonia National Park, Laguna Lachuá National Park, and Biotopo Mario Dary Rivera. There can be found multiple caves, waterfalls and forests which are home to the rare Quetzal. Thus, Cobán has become a popular spot for eco-tourism.

Biogeographically, the surrounding karst landscape and cloud forest ecosystems of the Sierra de Chamá transition zone harbor exceptional orchid diversity and sub-surface hydrological networks, making the municipality a vital ecological corridor in central Guatemala.

Additional popular tourist spots in the city of Cobán include the El Calvario Church, the Dieseldorff coffee plantation, Plaza Magdalena Shopping Center and Coban's central plaza.

== Geographic location ==
States

== See also ==
- Alta Verapaz
- Franja Transversal del Norte
