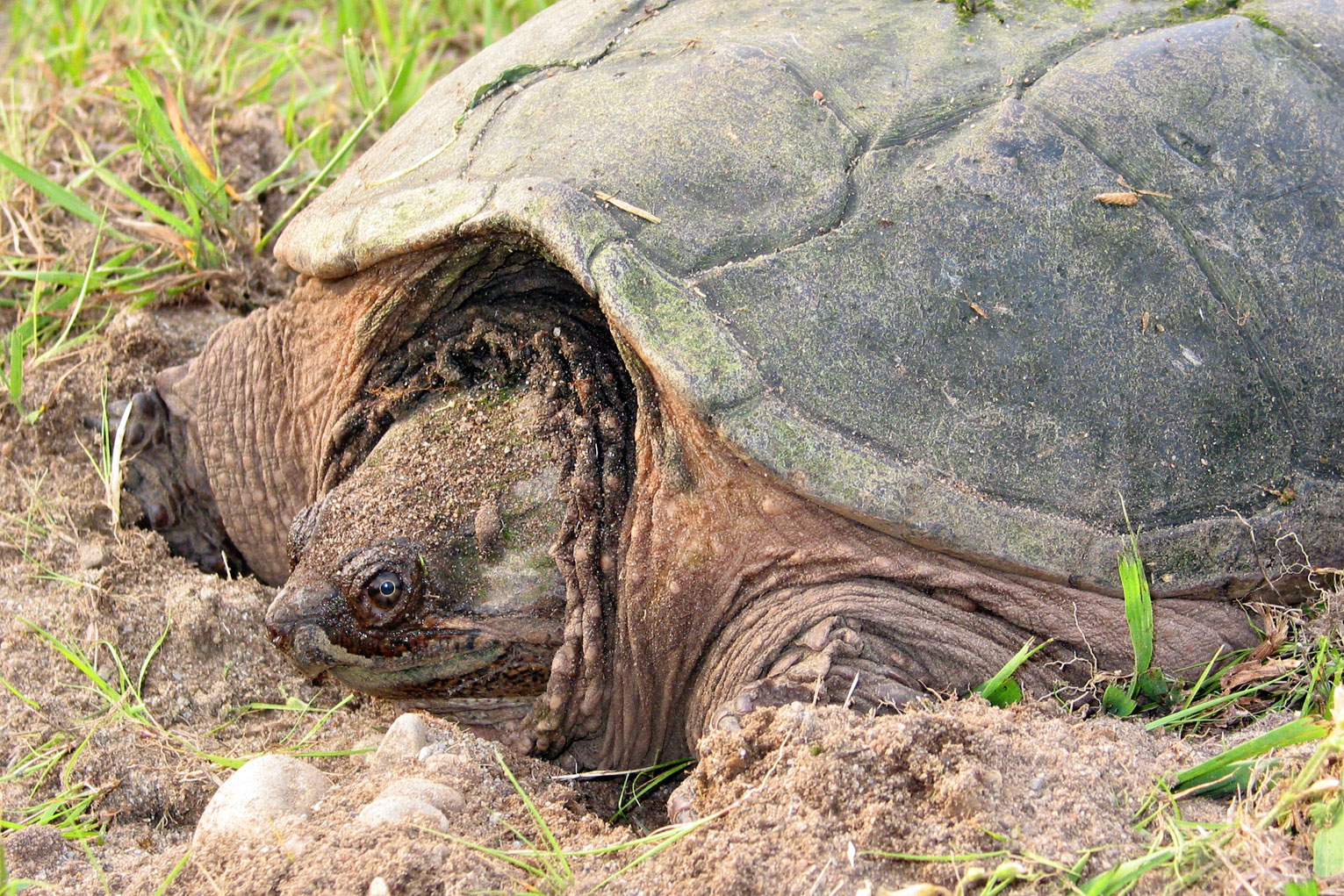
- Chelydra serpentina

Scientific classification
- Kingdom: Animalia
- Phylum: Chordata
- Class: Reptilia
- Order: Testudines
- Suborder: Cryptodira
- Family: Chelydridae
- Genus: Chelydra; Schweigger, 1812

Type species
- Chelydra serpentina Linnaeus, 1758

Species
- See text.

= Chelydra =

Genus of turtles

Chelydra is one of the two extant genera of the snapping turtle family, Chelydridae, the other being Macrochelys, the much larger alligator snapping turtle. The snapping turtles are native to the Americas, with Chelydra having three species, one in North America and two in Central America, one of which is also found in northwestern South America.

== Species ==
The genus Chelydra has the following species:

- Chelydra acutirostris (W. Peters, 1862) – South American snapping turtle
- Chelydra rossignonii (Bocourt, 1868) – Central American snapping turtle
- Chelydra serpentina (Linnaeus, 1758) – common snapping turtle (North America)
- Chelydra floridana†
- Chelydra laticarinata†
- Chelydra sculpta†

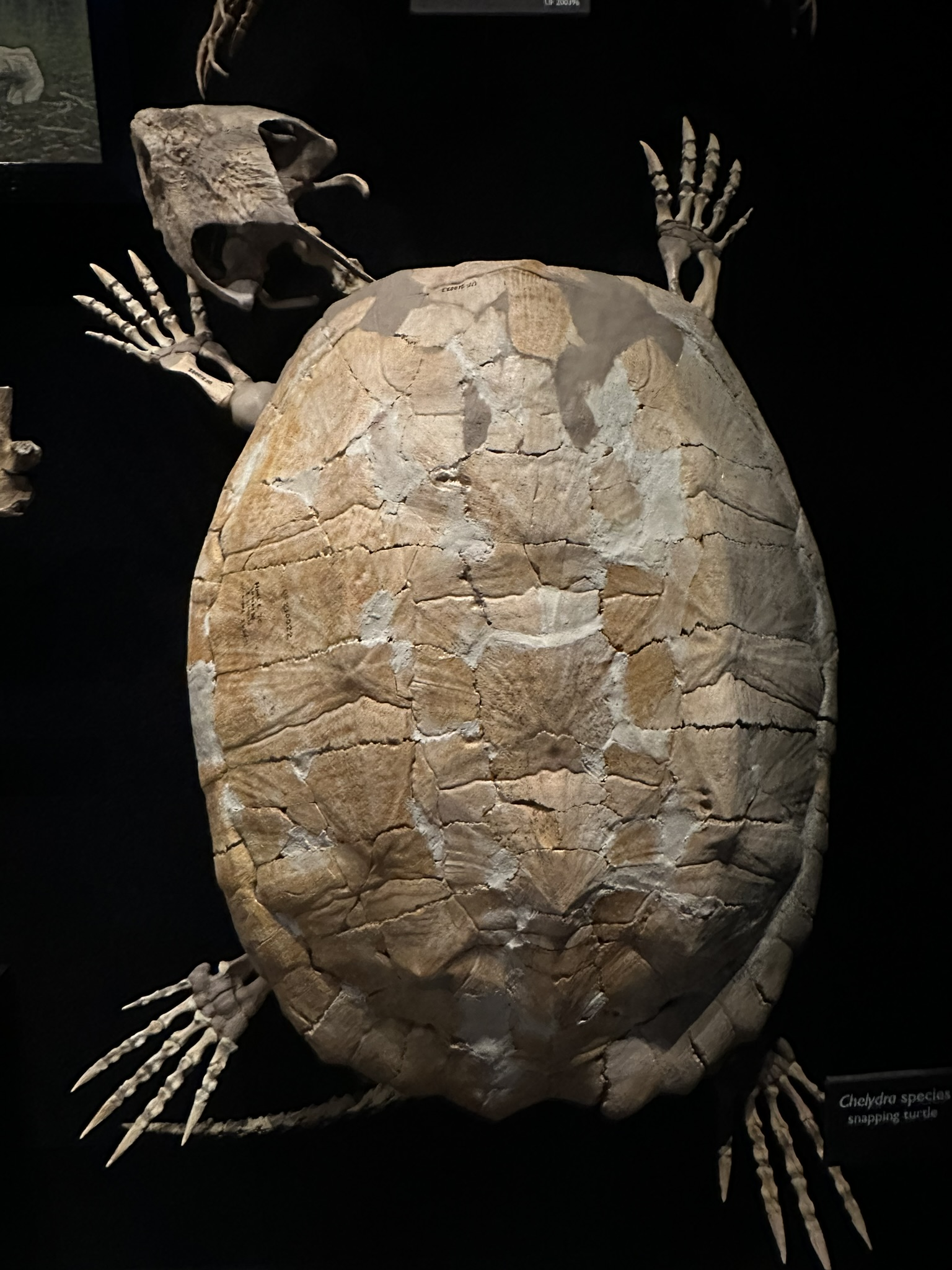
A Pliocene-aged Chelydra fossil skeleton from Florida (FLMNH)

The three extant Chelydra species were once all considered to be several subspecies of Chelydra serpentina, along with a fourth subspecies in Florida, Chelydra serpentina osceola. C. s. osceola is now considered to be synonymous with C. serpentina.
