= Common snapping turtle =

- A common snapping turtle crossing the trail at John Heinz NWR

Conservation status
- Least Concern (IUCN 3.1)
- CITES Appendix II

Scientific classification
- Kingdom: Animalia
- Phylum: Chordata
- Class: Reptilia
- Order: Testudines
- Suborder: Cryptodira
- Family: Chelydridae
- Genus: Chelydra
- Species: C. serpentina

Binomial name
- Chelydra serpentina (Linnaeus, 1758)
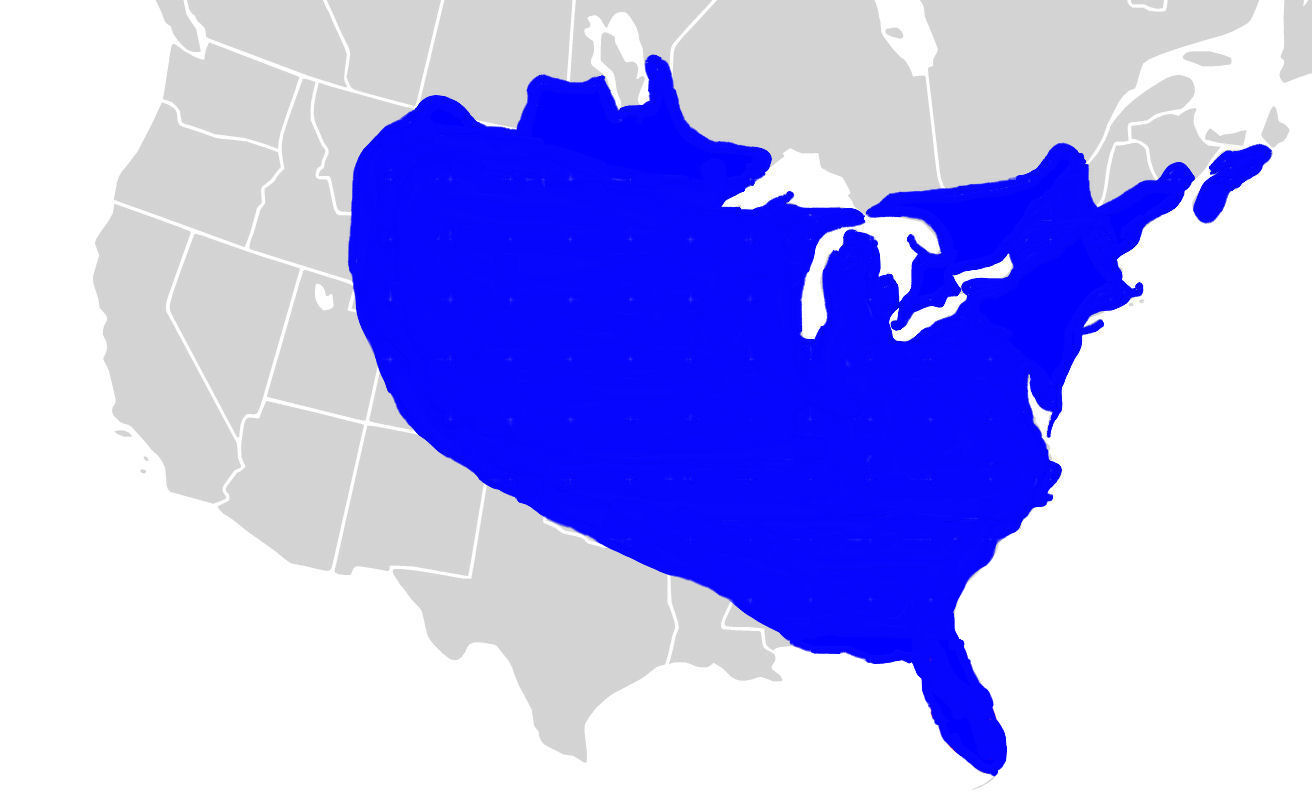
- Native range map of C. serpentina

Synonyms
- Testudo serpentina Linnaeus, 1758; Chelydra serpentina Schweigger, 1812

Species of turtles

The common snapping turtle (Chelydra serpentina) is a species of large, freshwater turtles in the family Chelydridae. Its natural range extends from southeastern Canada, southwest to the edge of the Rocky Mountains, as far east as Nova Scotia, and Florida. The present-day C. serpentina population in the Middle Rio Grande suggests that the common snapping turtle has been present in this drainage since at least the 17th century and is likely native. The three species of Chelydra and the larger alligator snapping turtles (genus Macrochelys) are the only extant chelydrids, a family now restricted to the Americas. The common snapping turtle, as its name implies, is the most widespread.

The common snapping turtle is noted for its combative disposition when out of the water, with its powerful, beak-like jaws, and highly mobile head and neck (hence the specific epithet serpentina, meaning "snake-like"). In water, it is likely to flee and hide underwater in sediment. The common snapping turtle has a life-history strategy characterized by high and variable mortality of embryos and hatchlings, delayed sexual maturity, extended adult longevity, and iteroparity (repeated reproductive events) with low reproductive success per reproductive event.

Females, and presumably also males, in more northern populations mature later (at 15–20 years) and at a larger size than in more southern populations (about 12 years). Lifespan in the wild is poorly known, but long-term mark-recapture data from Algonquin Park in Ontario, Canada, suggest a maximum age over 100 years.

== Systematics and taxonomy ==
Currently, no subspecies of the common snapping turtle are recognized. The former Florida subspecies osceola is currently considered a synonym of serpentina, while the other former subspecies Chelydra rossignonii and Chelydra acutirostris are both recognized as full species.

== Description ==
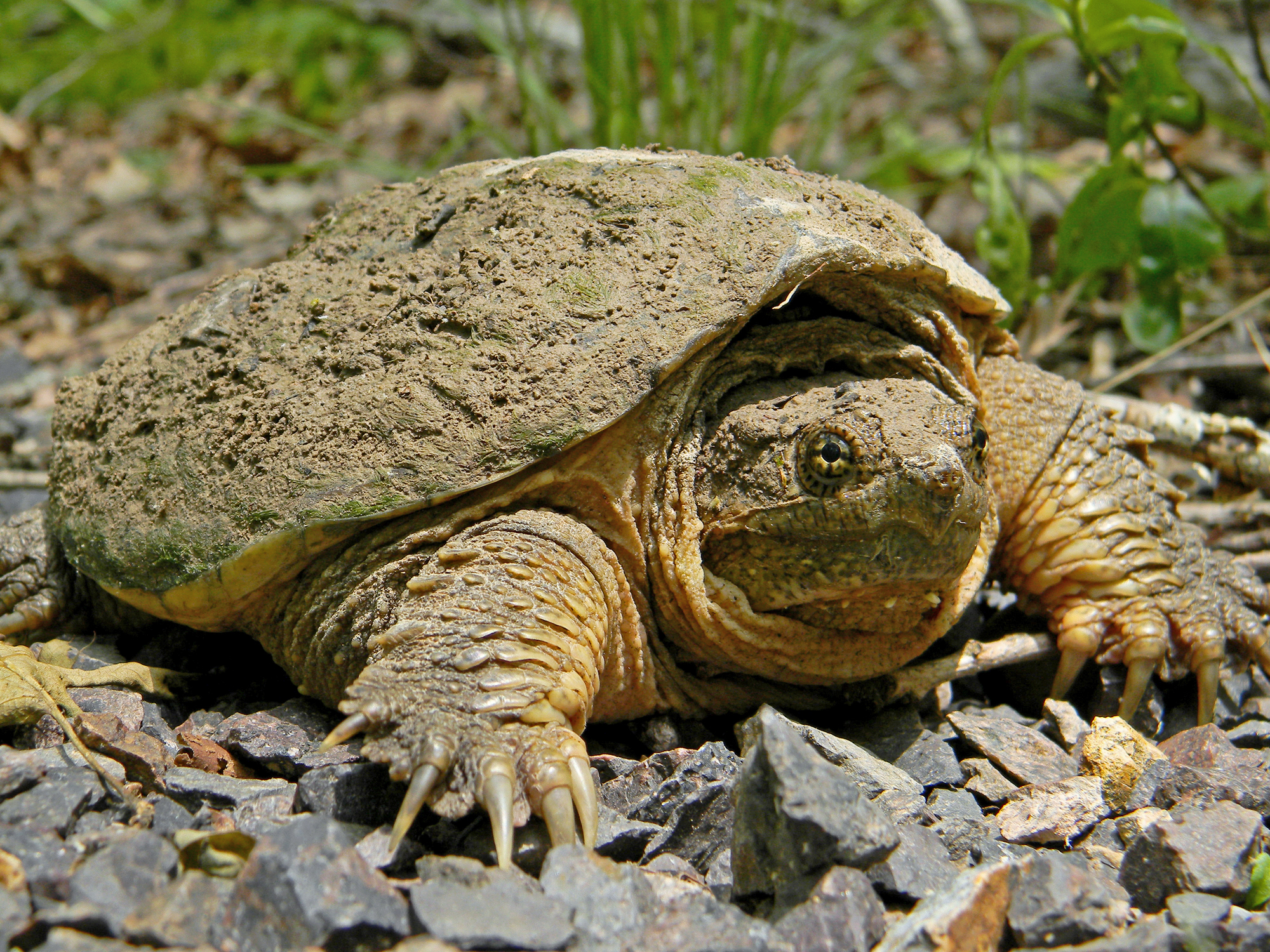
Close-up in Taum Sauk Mountain State Park, Missouri

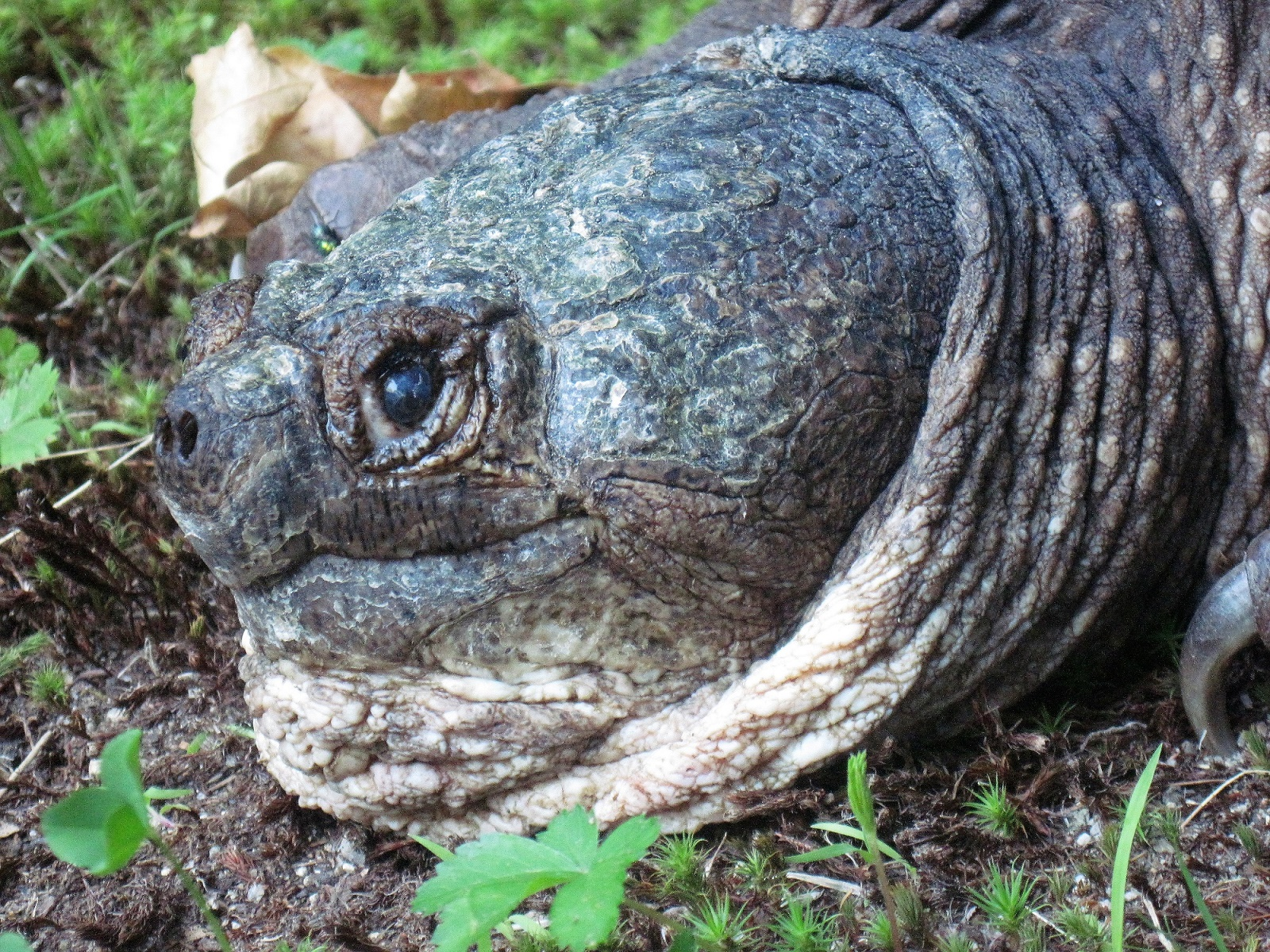
Head

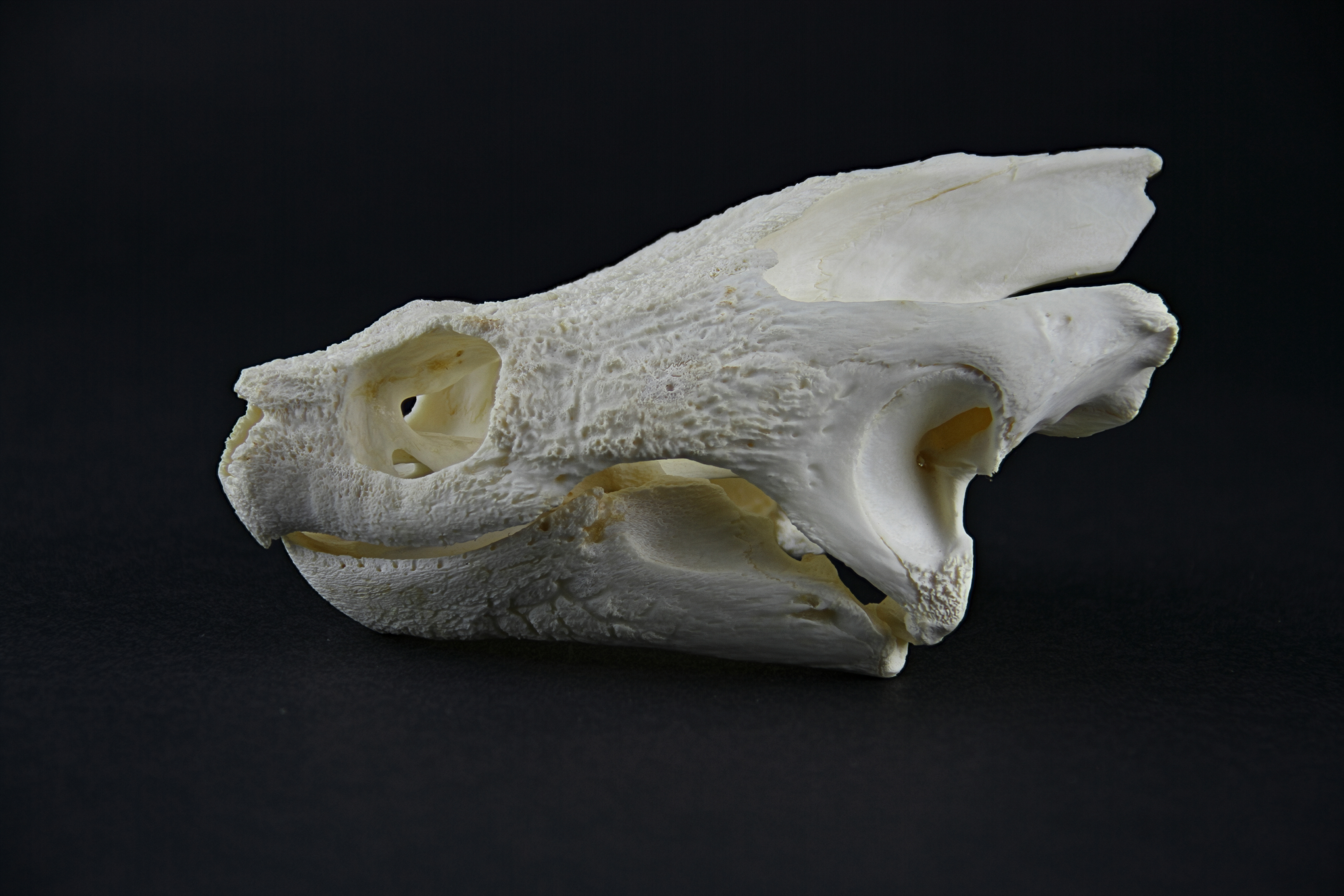
Skull

Skull of C. serpentina, three-dimensional model

C. serpentina has a rugged, muscular build with a ridged carapace (upper shell) that varies in color from tan to brown and black, although ridges tend to be more pronounced in younger individuals. The straight-line carapace length in adulthood may be nearly 50 cm (20 in), though lengths of 25–47 cm (9.8–18.5 in) are more common. C. serpentina usually weighs 4.5–16 kg (9.9–35.3 lb). Per one study, breeding common snapping turtles were found to average 28.5 cm (11.2 in) in carapace length and 22.5 cm (8.9 in) in plastron length and weigh about 6 kg (13 lb).

Males are larger than females, with almost all weighing in excess of 10 kg (22 lb) being male and quite old, as the species continues to grow throughout life. Any specimen above the aforementioned weights is exceptional, but the heaviest wild specimen caught reportedly weighed 34 kg (75 lb). Common snapping turtles kept in captivity can be quite overweight due to overfeeding and have weighed as much as 39 kg (86 lb). In the northern part of its range, the common snapping turtle is often the heaviest native freshwater turtle.

Common snapping turtles have well-developed olfactory organs, nerves, and bulbs that suggest that this species has a great sense of smell.

== Ecology and life history ==
Common habitats for these turtles are shallow ponds or streams. Some may inhabit brackish environments, such as estuaries. These sources of water tend to have an abundance of aquatic vegetation due to the shallow pools. Some describe them as habitat generalists as they can occupy most permanent bodies of water. Common snapping turtles sometimes bask—though rarely observed—by floating on the surface with only their carapaces exposed, though in the northern parts of their range, they also readily bask on fallen logs in early spring. In shallow waters, common snapping turtles may lie beneath a muddy bottom with only their heads exposed, stretching their long necks to the surface for an occasional breath. Their nostrils are positioned on the very tip of the snout, effectively functioning as snorkels.

=== Diet ===
Common snapping turtles are omnivorous. Important aquatic scavengers, they are also active hunters that use ambush tactics to prey on anything they can swallow, including many invertebrates, fish, frogs, other amphibians, reptiles (including snakes and smaller turtles), unwary birds, and small mammals. There has been no documented difference between the diets of males and females. In a recent study, young common snapping turtles showed that their lower bite force matches their active foraging behavior, meaning they have to travel and seek out more prey to make up for their inability to eat some items. In some areas, adult common snapping turtles can occasionally be incidentally detrimental to breeding waterfowl, but their effect on such prey as ducklings and goslings is frequently exaggerated. As omnivorous scavengers, though, they also feed on carrion and a surprisingly large amount of aquatic vegetation.

=== Predators ===
Common snapping turtles have few predators when older, but eggs are subject to predation by crows, American mink, skunks, foxes, and raccoons. Egg predators use three types of cues to locate turtle nests:

- Visual cues – seeing where the female has dug the soil for the nest chamber and seeing the turtle
- Tactile cues – soft surface around the nest site
- Chemosensory cues – scent of the musk of the female that she leaves on the surface of the soil as she digs

As hatchlings and juveniles, most of the same predators attack them, as well as herons (mostly great blue herons), bitterns, hawks, owls, fishers, American bullfrogs, large fish, and snakes. Some records during winter in Canada indicate hibernating adult common snapping turtles being ambushed and preyed on by northern river otters. Other natural predators which have reportedly preyed on adults include coyotes, American black bears, American alligators, and the related alligator snapping turtles. Large, old male common snapping turtles have very few natural threats due to their formidable size and defenses, and tend to have a very low annual mortality rate.

=== Reproduction ===
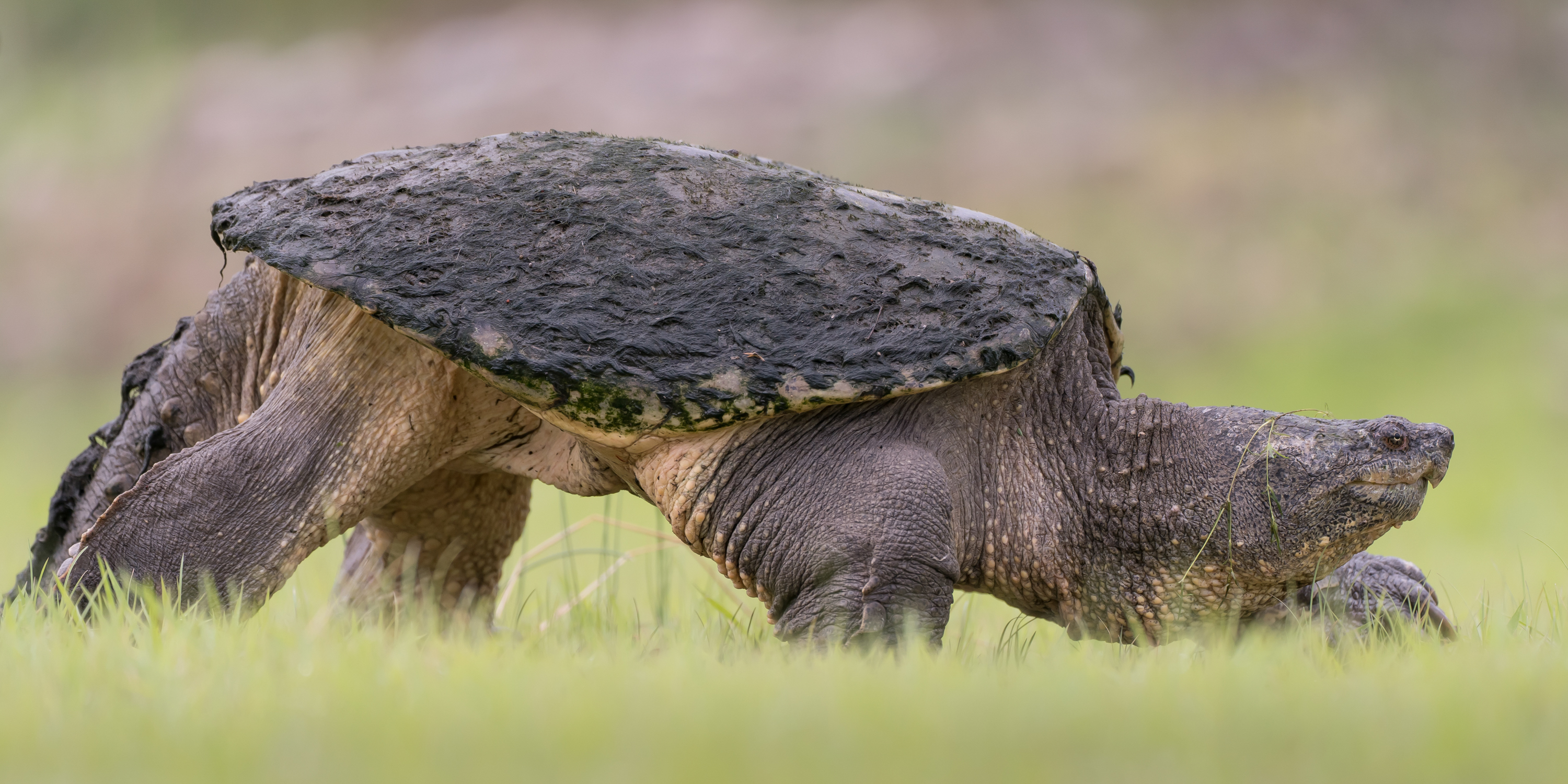
Walking on land, at Gavins Point National Fish Hatchery

These turtles travel extensively over land to reach new habitats or to lay eggs. Pollution, habitat destruction, food scarcity, overcrowding, and other factors drive them to move; finding them traveling far from the nearest water source is common. Experimental data support the idea that common snapping turtles can sense the Earth's magnetic field, which could also be used for such movements (together with a variety of other possible orientation cues).

This species mates from April through November, with their peak laying season in June and July. The female can hold sperm for several seasons, using it as necessary. Females travel over land to find sandy soil in which to lay their eggs, often some distance from the water. After digging a hole, the female typically deposits 25 to 80 eggs each year, guiding them into the nest with her hind feet and covering them with sand for incubation and protection. These eggs have a leathery, flexible shell, and they typically measure only 26–28 mm in diameter.

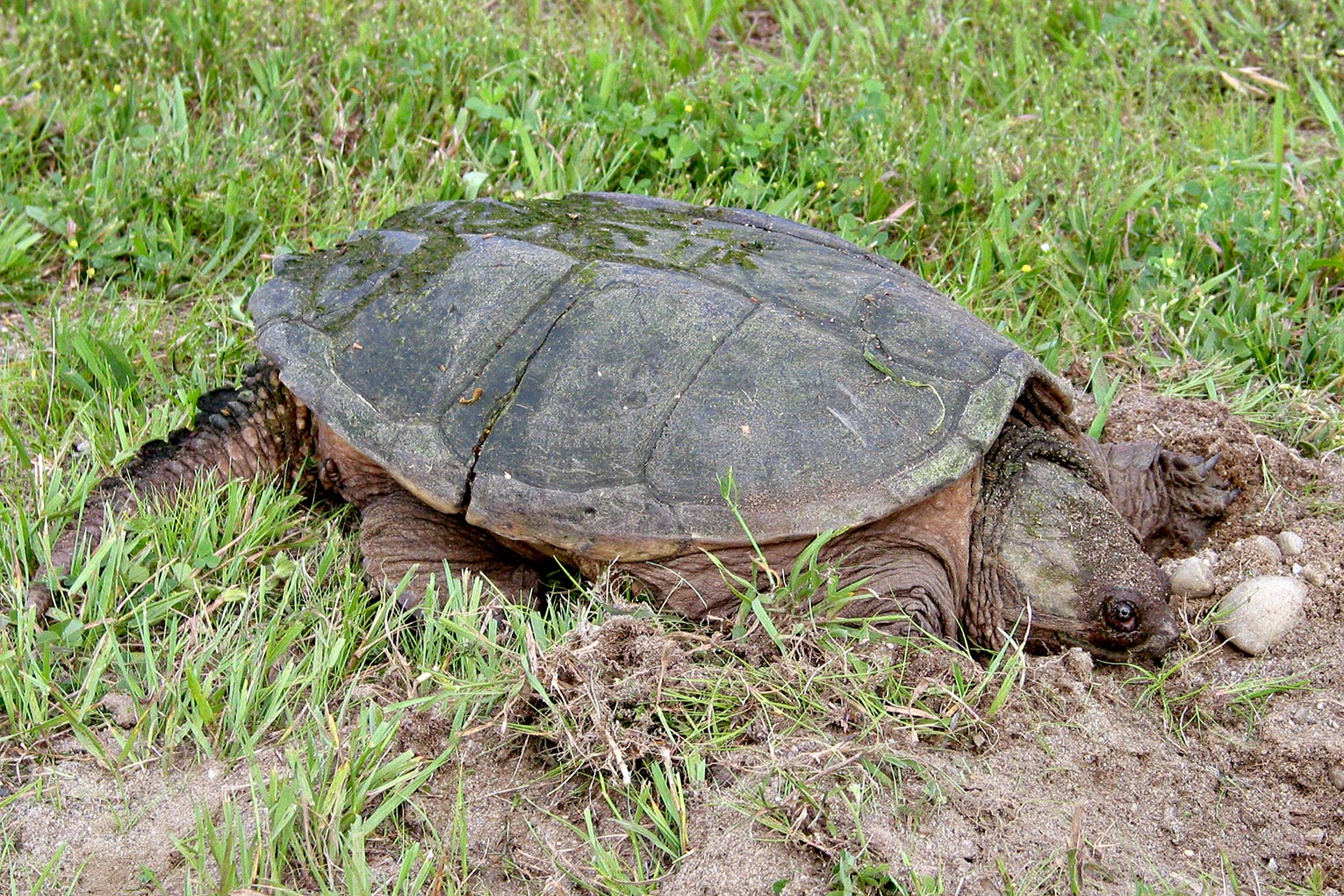
Female excavating nest

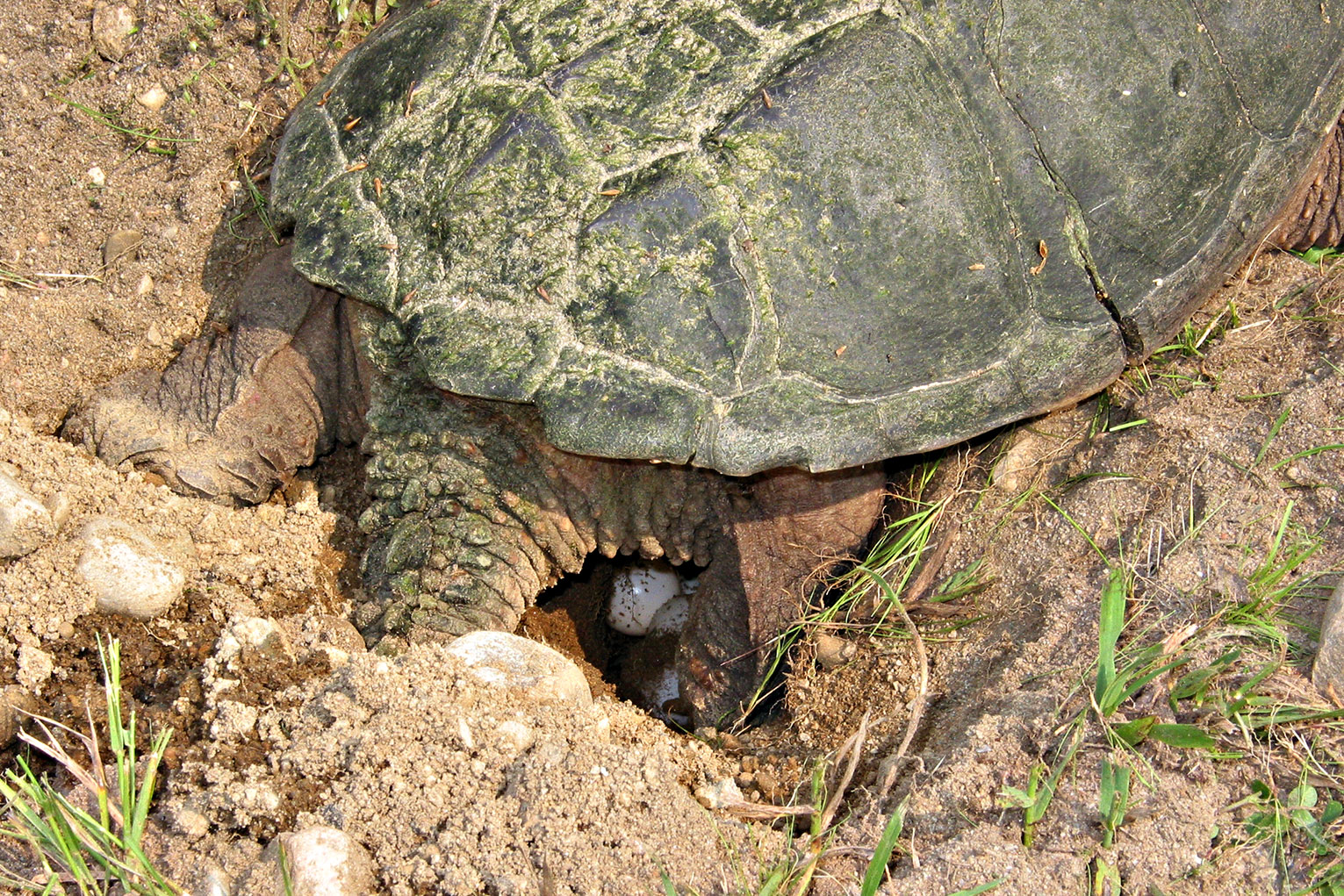
Egg laying

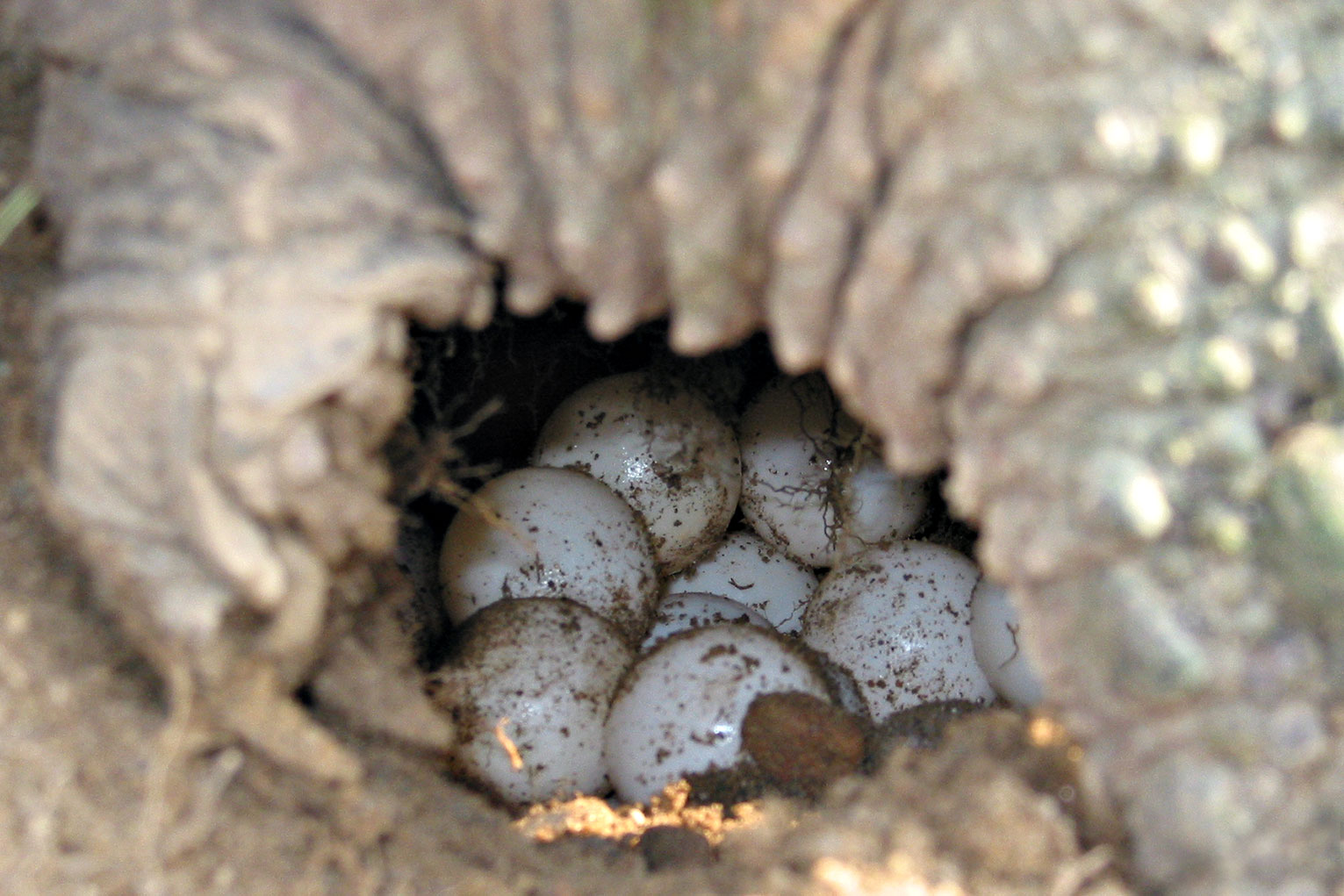
Eggs

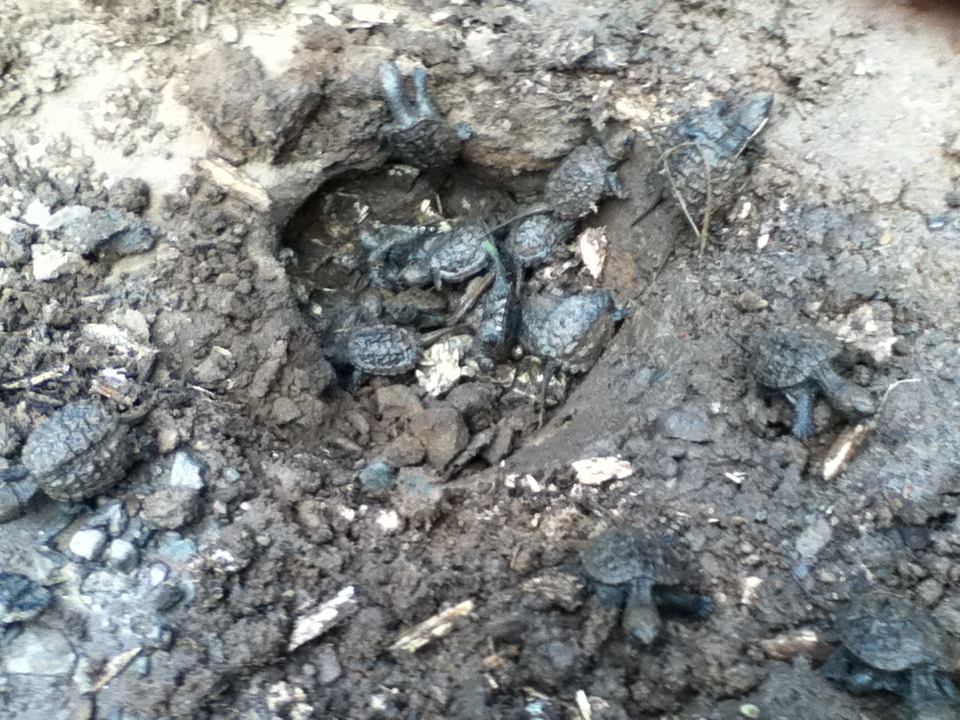
Hatchlings emerging from the ground

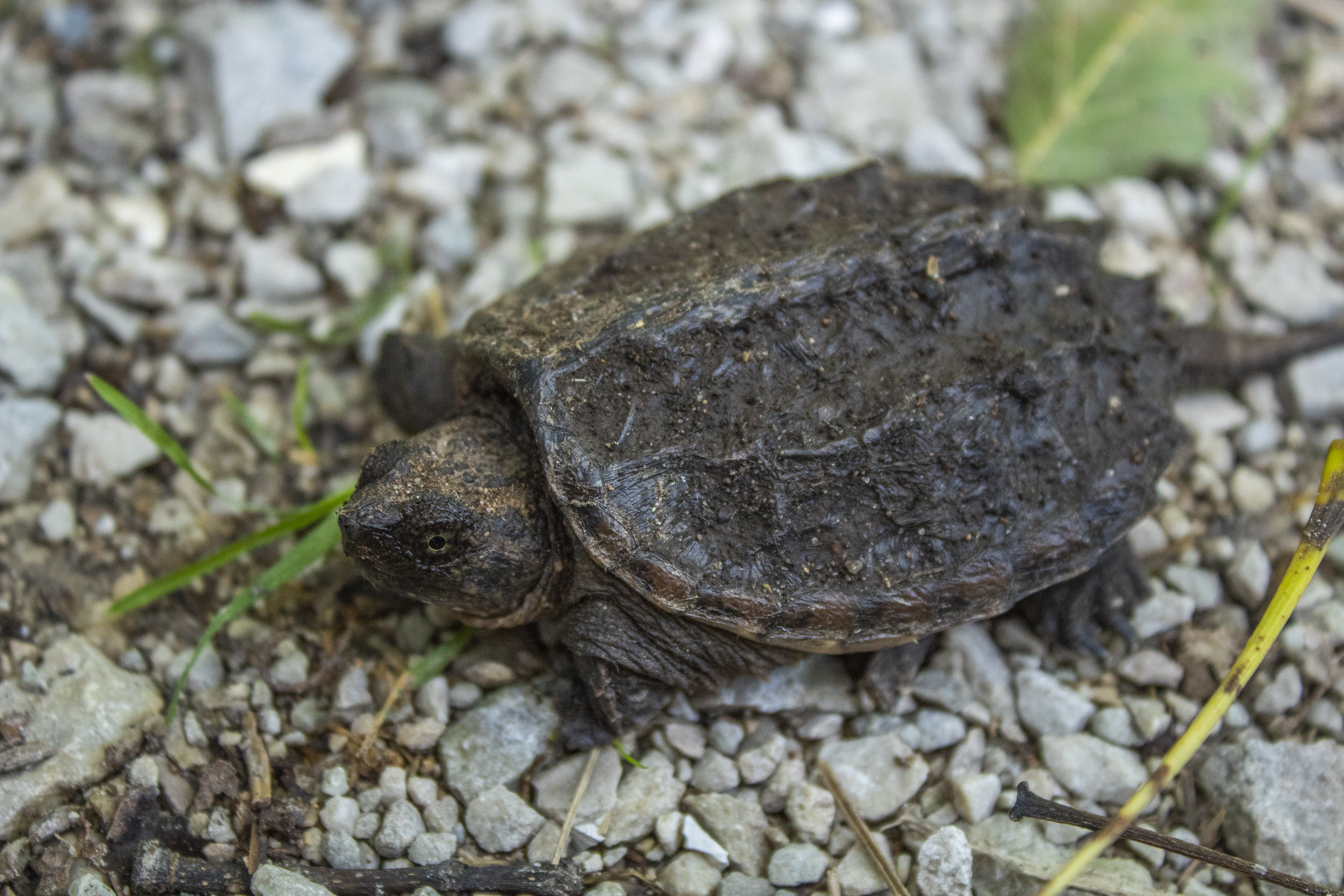
Young juvenile, on a hiking path at Illinois Beach State Park

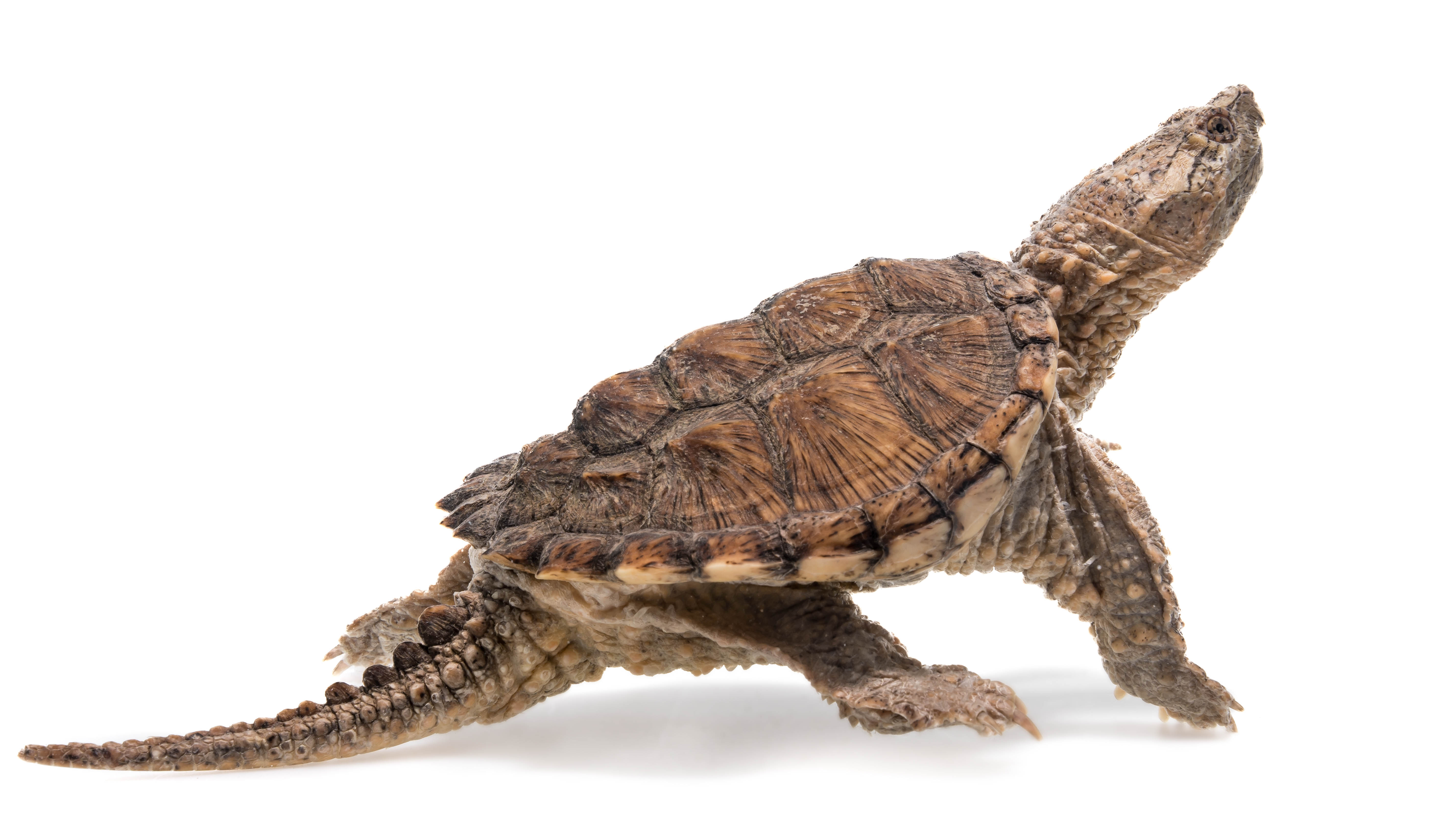
Older juvenile

Incubation time is temperature-dependent, ranging from 9 to 18 weeks. One study on the incubation period of the common snapping turtle incubated the eggs at two temperatures: 20 °C (68 °F) and 30 °C (86 °F). The research found that the incubation period at the higher temperature was significantly shorter at about 63 days, while at the lower temperature the time was around 140 days. In cooler climates, hatchlings overwinter in the nest. The common snapping turtle is remarkably cold-tolerant; radiotelemetry studies have shown some individuals do not hibernate, but remain active under the ice during the winter. In addition to incubation time, temperature also affects sex determination. Females develop at low and high temperatures, while males develop in the intermediate temperature range. Fall temperatures had a positive effect on clutch size and clutch mass, whereas spring temperatures had no impact.

Common snapping turtle hatchlings have recently been found to make sounds before nest exit onto the surface, a phenomenon also known from species in the South American genus Podocnemis and the Ouachita map turtle. These sounds are mostly "clicking" noises, but other sounds, including those that sound somewhat like a "creak" or rubbing a finger along a fine-toothed comb, are also sometimes produced.

=== Respiration ===
In the northern part of their range common snapping turtles do not breathe for more than six months because ice covers their hibernating site. During prolonged submergence in cold, ice-covered water, C. serpentina drastically reduce their metabolic rate and rely on aquatic oxygen uptake to meet minimal metabolic demands. This turtle can get oxygen by pushing its head out of the mud and allowing gas exchange to take place through the membranes of its mouth and throat. This is known as extrapulmonary respiration.

If they cannot get enough oxygen through this method, common snapping turtles start to use anaerobic pathways, burning sugars and fats without the use of oxygen. The metabolic by-products from this process are acidic and create very undesirable side effects by spring, which are known as oxygen debt. Although designated as "least concern" on the IUCN redlist, the species has been designated in the Canadian part of its range as "special concern" due to its life history being sensitive to disruption by anthropogenic activity.

== Behavior ==
When common snapping turtles encounter a species unfamiliar to them, such as humans, in rare instances, they become curious and survey the situation and even more rarely may bump their noses on a leg of the person standing in the water. Although common snapping turtles have fierce dispositions, when they are encountered in the water or a swimmer approaches, they usually slip quietly away from any disturbance or may seek shelter under mud or grass nearby. They exhibit some aggression toward conspecifics, but coexist in the same habitat.

== Relationship with humans ==
=== As food ===
The common snapping turtle is a traditional ingredient in turtle soup; consumption in large quantities, however, can become a health concern due to potential concentration of toxic environmental pollutants in the turtle's flesh.

=== In captivity ===
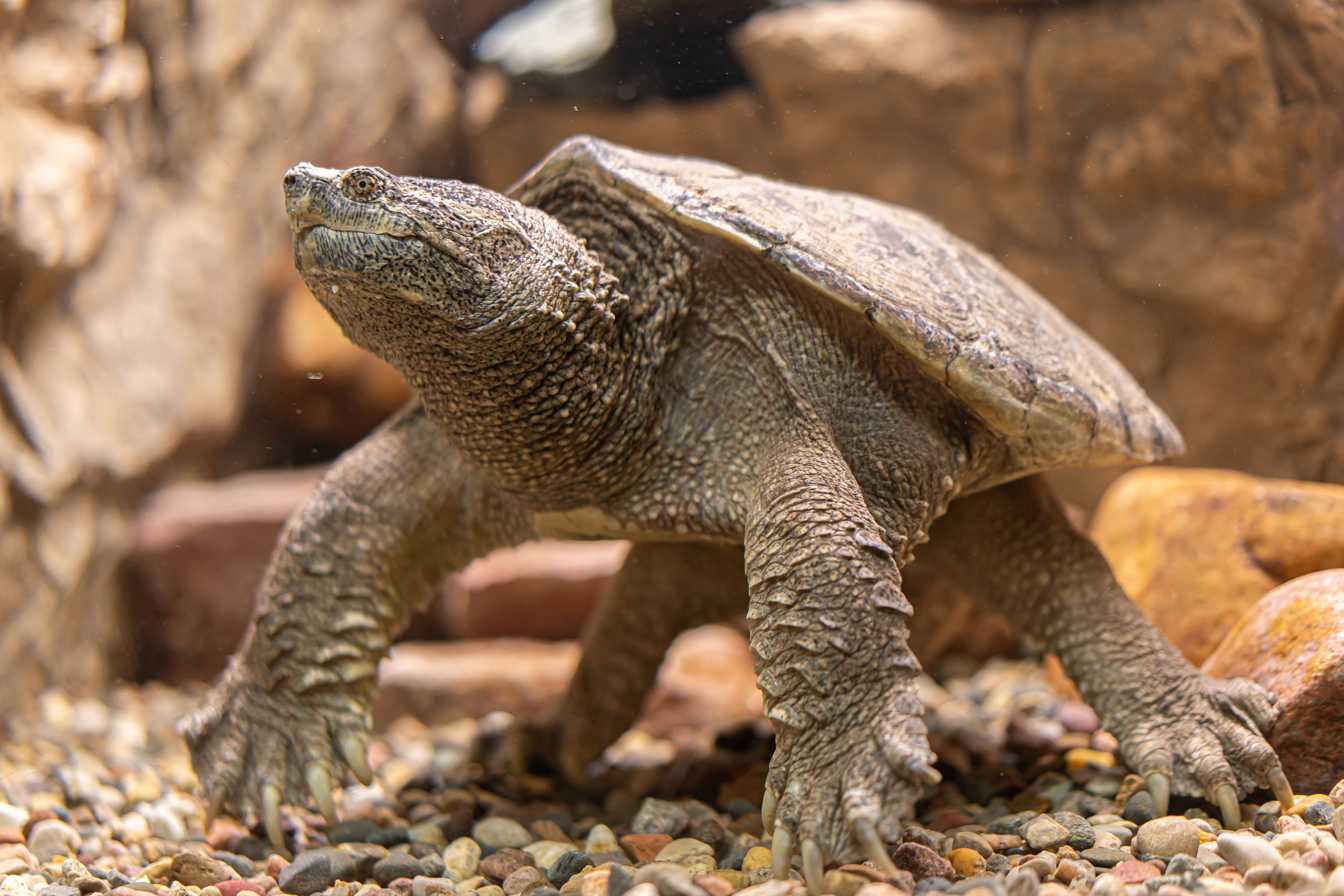
In captivity

The common snapping turtle is not an ideal pet. Its neck is very flexible, and a wild turtle can bite its handler even if picked up by the sides of its shell. Veterinary care is best left to a reptile specialist. A wild common snapping turtle can make a hissing sound when it is threatened or encountered, but prefers not to provoke confrontations.

A common misconception exists that common snapping turtles may be safely picked up by the tail with no harm to the animal; in fact, this has a high chance of injuring the turtle, especially the tail itself and the vertebral column. Lifting the turtle with the hands is difficult and dangerous. Snappers can stretch their necks back across their own carapace and to their hind feet on either side to bite. When they feel stressed, they release a musky odor from behind their legs.

Rescuing a common snapping turtle found on a road by getting it to bite a stick and then dragging it out of immediate danger may be tempting. This action, though, can scrape the legs and underside of the turtle severely and lead to deadly infections in the wounds. The safest way to pick up this turtle is by grasping the carapace behind the back legs, being careful to not grasp the tail. A large gap behind the back legs allows for easy grasping of the carapace and keeps hands safe from both the beak and claws of the turtle. It can also be picked up with a shovel, from the back, making sure the shovel is square across the bottom of the shell. The easiest way, though, is with a blanket or tarp, picking up the corners with the turtle in the middle.

Common snapping turtles are raised on some turtle farms in mainland China.

=== In politics ===
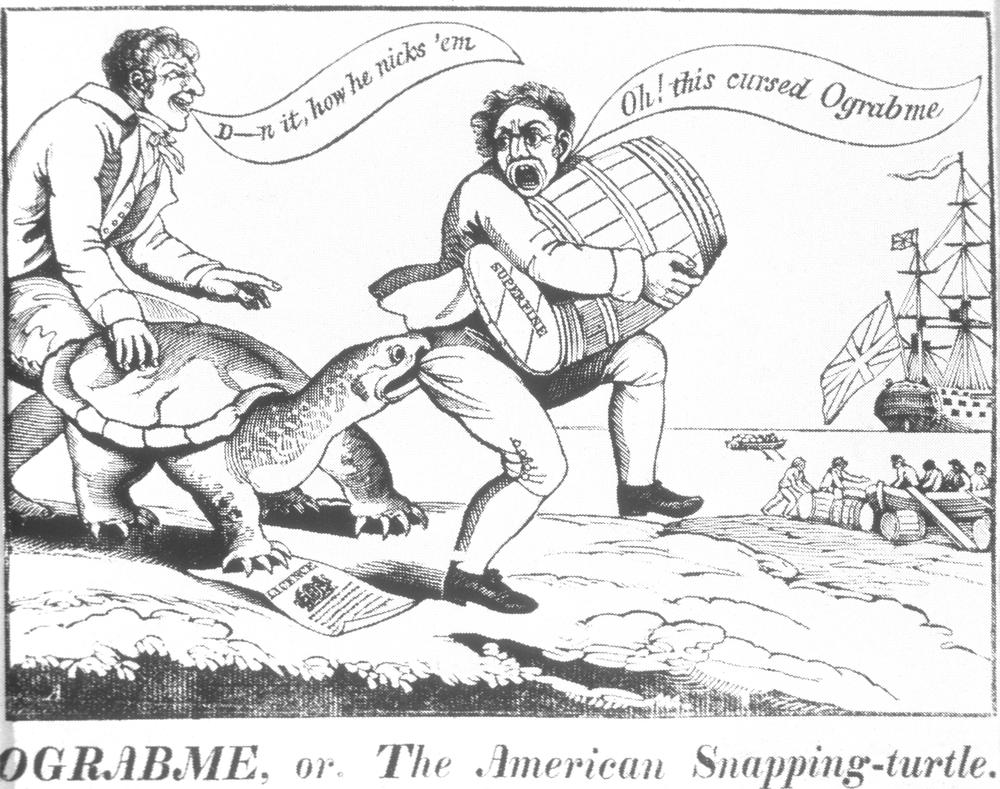
Political cartoon depicting merchants attempting to dodge the "Ograbme"

The common snapping turtle was the central feature of a famous American political cartoon. Published in 1808 in protest at the Jeffersonian Embargo Act of 1807, the cartoon depicted a common snapping turtle, jaws locked fiercely to an American trader who was attempting to carry a barrel of goods onto a British ship. The trader was seen whimsically uttering the words "Oh! this cursed Ograbme" ("embargo" spelled backwards, and also "O, grab me" as the turtle is doing). This piece is widely considered a pioneering work within the genre of the modern political propaganda.

In 2006, the common snapping turtle was declared the state reptile of New York by vote of the New York Legislature after being chosen by the state's public elementary school children.

=== Reputation ===
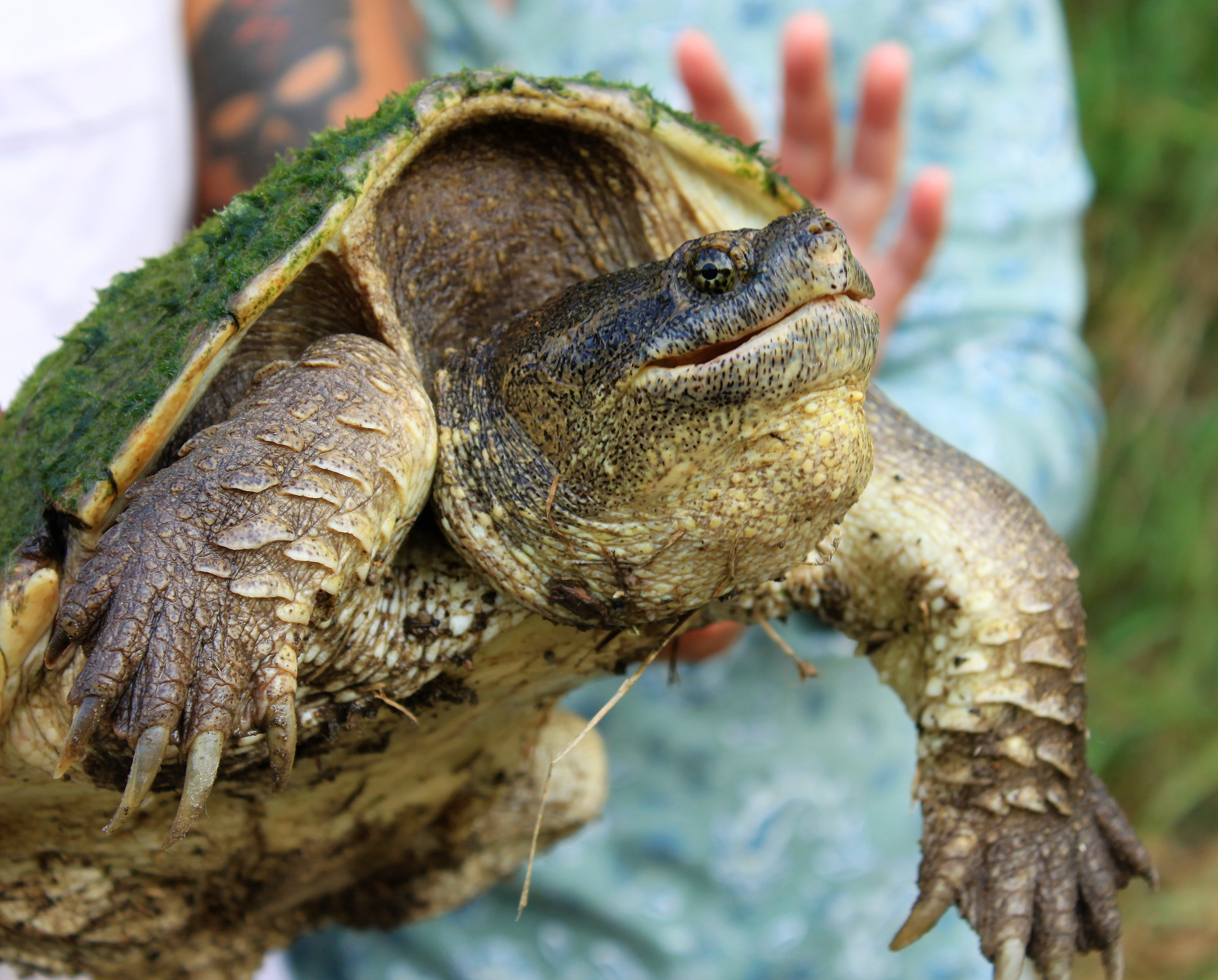
The common snapping turtle uses its large claws for digging, not offense – though the claws can become dangerous when handled by humans.

While common snapping turtles are commonly thought to be able to bite off human fingers or toes, and their powerful jaws are more than capable of doing so, no proven cases have ever been presented for this species, as they use their overall size and strength to deter would-be predators. They are "quite docile" animals underwater that prefer to avoid confrontations rather than provoke them. There is a folkloric belief of uncertain origin that a snapper which has grasped onto something with its jaws will only release its hold at the sound of thunder.

The ability to bite forcefully is extremely useful for consuming hard-bodied prey items such as mollusks, crustaceans, and turtles, along with some plant matter, such as nuts and seeds. In 2023, a study done by Lagrange et al. found that the common snapping turtle (Chelydra serpentina) registered between 62 and 564 Newtons of force when it came to jaw strength. In comparison, the average bite force of a human (molar area) is between 300 and 700 Newtons. Another non-closely related species known as the alligator snapping turtle has been known to bite off fingers, and at least three documented cases are known.

== Invasive species ==
In recent years in Italy, large, mature adult C. serpentina turtles have been taken from bodies of water throughout the country. They were most probably introduced by the release of unwanted pets. In March 2011, an individual weighing 20 kg (44 lb) was captured in a canal near Rome; another individual was captured near Rome in September 2012.

In Japan, the species was introduced as an exotic pet in the 1960s. In 2004 and 2005, some 1,000 individuals were found in Chiba Prefecture, making up the majority of individuals believed to have been introduced.

== Conservation ==
The species is currently classified as least concern by the IUCN, but has declined sufficiently due to pressure from collection for the pet trade and habitat degradation that Canada and several U.S. states have enacted or are proposing stricter conservation measures. In Canada, it is listed as "special concern" in the Species at Risk Act in 2011 and is a target species for projects that include surveys, identification of major habitats, investigation and mitigation of threats, and education of the public including landowners. Involved bodies include governmental departments, universities, museums, and citizen science projects.

Although common snapping turtles are listed as a species of least concern, anthropogenic factors still may have major effects on populations. Decades of road mortality may cause severe population decline in the populations present in urbanized wetlands. A study in southwestern Ontario monitored a population near a busy roadway and found a loss of 764 individuals in only 17 years. The population decreased from 941 individuals in 1985 to 177 individuals in 2002. Road mortality may put common snapping turtle populations at risk of extirpation. Exclusion fencing could aid in decreasing population loss.
