= Las Victorias =

National park in Alta Verapaz, Guatemala

Las Victorias National Park
- Interactive map of Las Victorias National Park
- Location: Alta Verapaz, Guatemala
- Coordinates: 15°28′38″N 90°22′54″W
- Area: 0.82 km^{2} (0.32 sq mi)
- Elevation: 1,200 m (3,900 ft)
- Established: Decreto Legislativo 9-80
- Visitors: allowed
- Operator: INAB

Las Victorias National Park is located in Alta Verapaz, Guatemala, on the north-western outskirts of the city of Cobán (15.477182°N 90.381775°W). Formerly a finca acquired in the mid-19th century by the French coffee grower Jules Rossignon, Las Victorias was designated a national park in 1980. The park covers an area of 82 ha, and is managed by the National Forestry Institute (INAB).
