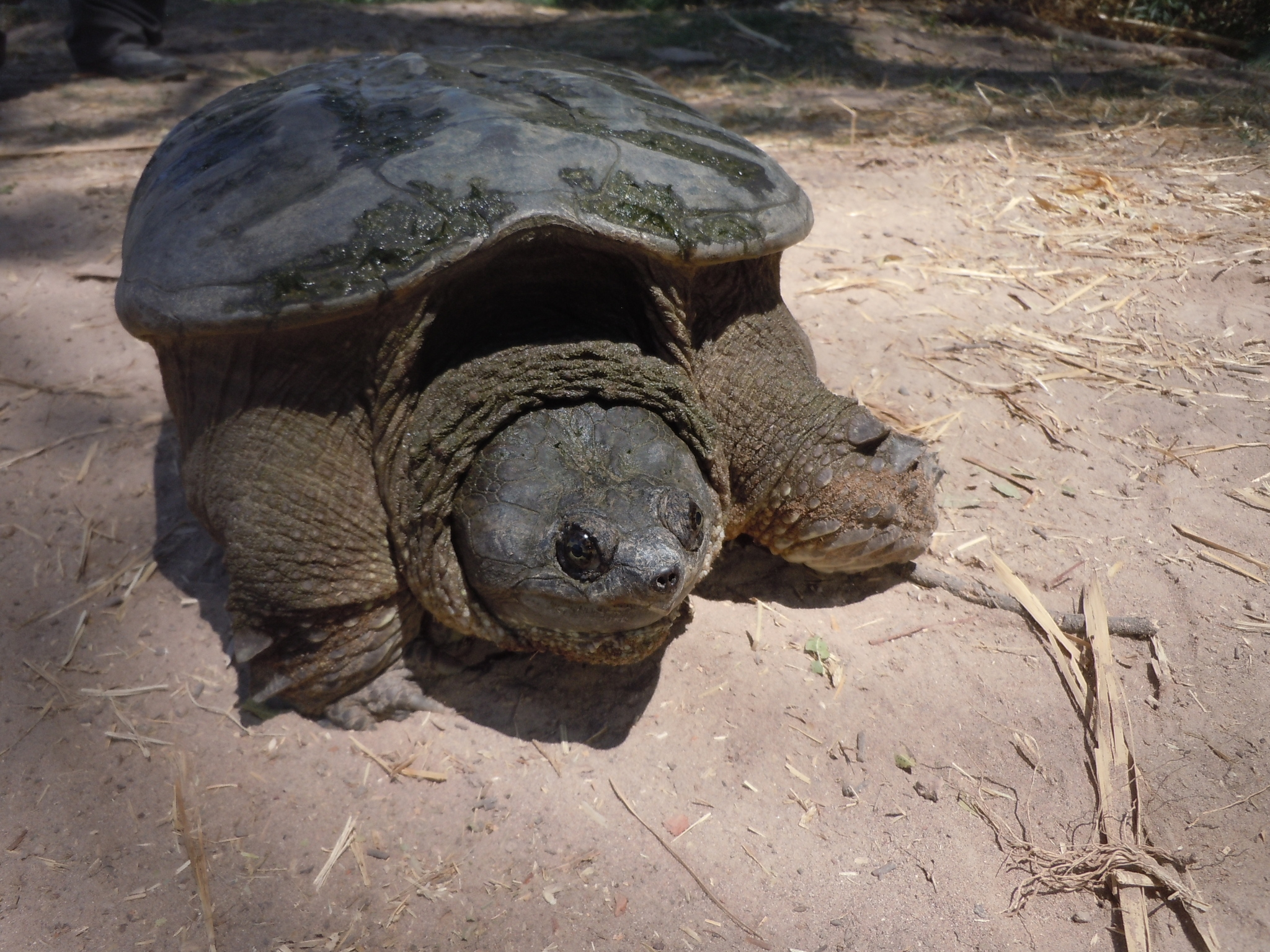

Conservation status
- Near Threatened (IUCN 3.1)

Scientific classification
- Kingdom: Animalia
- Phylum: Chordata
- Class: Reptilia
- Order: Testudines
- Suborder: Cryptodira
- Family: Chelydridae
- Genus: Chelydra
- Species: C. rossignonii

Binomial name
- Chelydra rossignonii (Bocourt, 1868)

Synonyms
- List: Emysaurus rossignonii Bocourt, 1868; Chelydra serpentina var. mexicana Cope, 1870 (nomen nudum); Chelydra rossignonii — Cope, 1872; Chelydra rossignoni [sic] — Günther, 1885 (ex errore); Chelydra serpentina rossignoni — Mertens, L. Müller & Rust, 1934; Chelydra serpentina rossignonii — Mertens & Wermuth, 1955; Chelydra rossignonii — Bonin, Devaux & Dupré, 2006

= Central American snapping turtle =

Species of turtle

The Central American snapping turtle (Chelydra rossignonii), also known commonly as the Mexican snapping turtle and the Yucatán snapping turtle, is a species of turtle in the family Chelydridae. The species is endemic to Central America and Mexico.

== Taxonomy ==
C. rossignonii was formerly considered a subspecies of C. serpentina, the common snapping turtle; it earned full species classification when scientists noted several genetic and morphological differences between the two species' skulls.

=== Etymology ===
The specific name, rossignonii, is in honor of French-born coffee grower Jules Rossignon.

=== Subspecies ===
There are no recognized subspecies of C. rossignonii.

== Description ==
C. rossignonii has a big head, lengthy tail, pointed snout, and a coarse carapace with three easily seen ridges. Its carapace comes in different colors, such as brown to olive or olive to black, while its small plastron can be either cream to yellow or tan to gray. This turtle's shell sometimes also has algae growing on it, which helps it to camouflage. The skin is either gray or black all over on adults, while juveniles have white speckles on their skin; the skin is also covered in long tubercles near the turtle's neck area.

== Distribution and habitat ==
C. rossignonii is found in Belize, Guatemala, Honduras, and Mexico. The natural habitats of C. rossignonii are slow-moving freshwater rivers, swamps, tributaries, and wetlands. It prefers murky water with large amounts of vegetation, and stays away from open water.

== Ecology and behavior ==
C. rossignonii is oviparous. It is also solitary and nocturnal. The species is believed to be mostly aquatic, rarely going on land or basking in open spaces.

=== Diet ===
The Central American snapping turtle hunts by luring its prey with four to six barbels around the mouth, as well as wriggling its tongue, while it sits motionless underwater with its mouth agape. The turtle randomly moves its barbels and tongue to appear to be small worms, attracting prey closer; when in striking-range, the turtle suddenly catches its prey with lightning-fast accuracy. It is believed to be an omnivore that forages for an assortment of prey, including crabs, frogs, fish, and shrimp, as well as some plant material.

== Conservation ==
In the last 30 years, C. rossignonii experienced a 30% population decline. It is threatened by habitat loss and overharvesting for food by poorer communities, who are indiscriminate in the turtle species they harvest. Although protected by law in México and Guatemala, these laws are not enforced accurately or evenly, and this snapping turtle is still being pursued. A captive breeding program has been established in order to help the species gain population. On July 9 2026, the Central American snapping turtle was evaluated as Near Threateneded and its populations are starting to be decreasing by the IUCN Red List.
