= El Calvario Church =

Catholic church in Cobán, Guatemala

Coordinates: 14.4049°N 90.6927°W

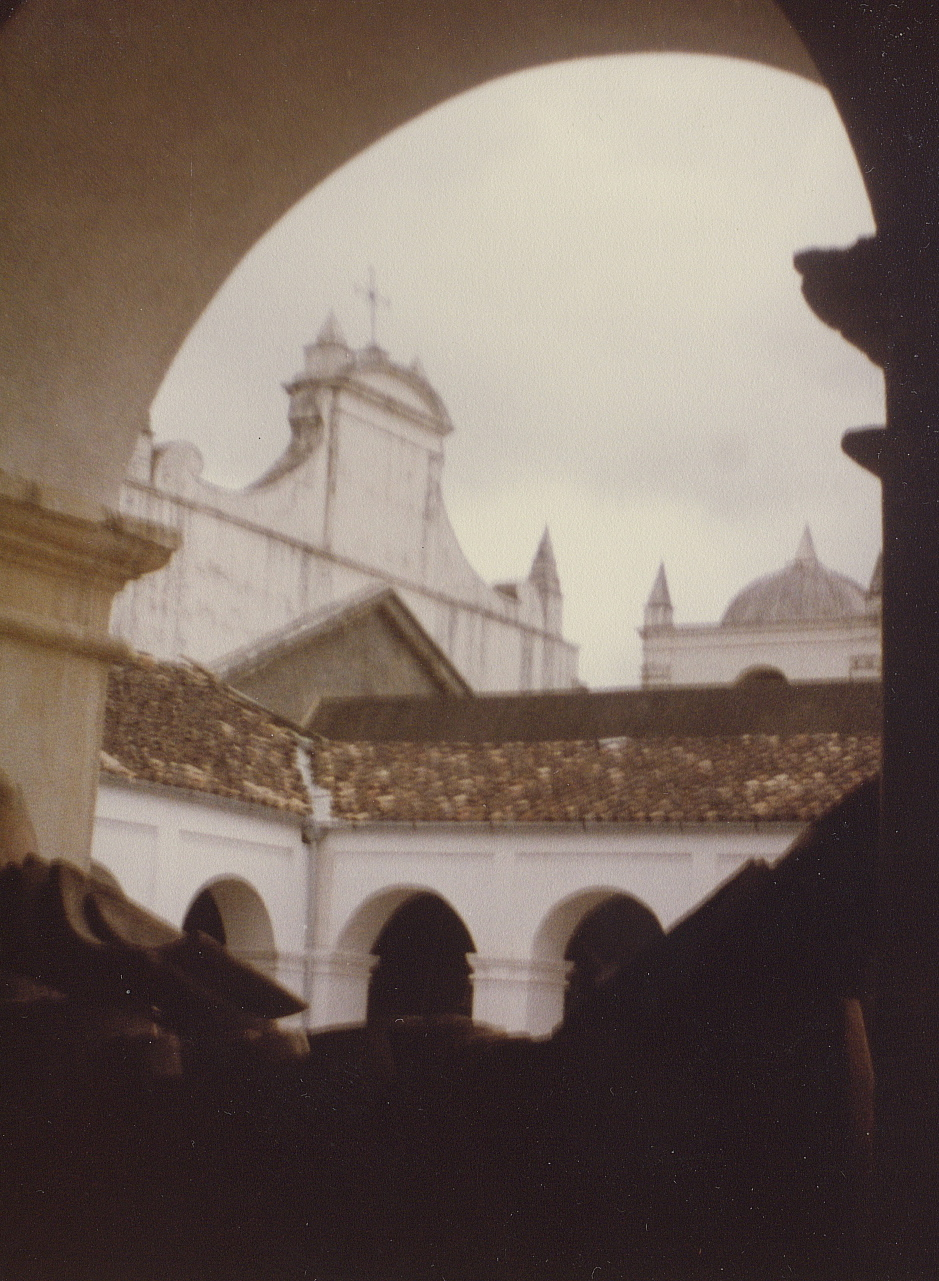
El Calvario Church

El Calvario Church is a church in Cobán, Guatemala.The terrace of the church is noted for its panoramic views of the city and views of the Rocja Mountains and Xucaneb, the highest point in Alta Verapaz Department to the southeast.
