= Jules Rossignon =

French professor, writer, scientific agriculturist and coffee grower

Jules Rossignon (also known as Julio Rossignon; ? in France – 1883) was a French professor, writer, scientific agriculturist, and international coffee grower. He produced coffee on his farm, Las Victorias, which is now a national park. Rossignon served as a professor at the University of Paris and was a scientific director for the Belgian Colonization Company.

A species of turtle, Chelydra rossignonii, is named in his honor.

== Selected works ==
- Proyecto de alumbrado de gas para la ciudad de Guatemala, presentado al Sr. Corregidor e individuos de la municipalidad (1846)
- Universidad de San Salvador : discurso pronunciado el 5 de diciembre 1851 para la apertura de las clases (1851)
- Manual de lechería y fabricación de quesos : precedido de algunos apuntes sobre la elección de las vacas lecheras (1858)
- Manual de barnices y preparación de charoles según los procederes mas recientes (1858)
- Manual del cohetero y polvorista, sea Compendio de pirotecnia (1859)
- Manual del Jardinero y Arbolista (1859)
- Manual de aceites y jabones : ó sea extracción de los aceites y grasas, y fabricación de los jabones con base de soda y potasa (1859)
- Manual del cultivo del añil y del nopal ó sea extracción del indigo, educacion y cosecha de la cochinilla, extracción de los principios colorantes de varias plantas tinctoriales (1859)
- Manual del cultivo del café, cacao, vainilla y tabaco en la America española y de todas sus aplicaciones (1859)
- Porvenir de la Verapaz en la República de Guatemala memoria dedicada al Consulado de Comercio de Guatemala (1861)
- Memoria dedicada al Consulado de Comercio de Guatemala (1861)
- Manual do Jardineiro e do arboricultor, ou Arte de compòr, dirigir e adornar toda a qualidade de jardins. De cultivar ... as flores, as hortalices ... formar latadas, aclimar as plantas exoticas na America meridional (1866)
- De la caña de azúcar, del laboreo del azucar (1867)
- Sociedad Económica de Amigos de Guatemala (1875)
- Republica de Guatemala en Centro America. Catalogo analitico y razonado de los objetos presentados por la república de Guatemala a la exposicion universal de Paris (1878), redactado por Julio Rossignon (1878)

== Bibliography ==
- Beolens, Bo; Watkins, Michael; Grayson, Michael (26 July 2011). The Eponym Dictionary of Reptiles. Johns Hopkins University Press. ISBN 978-1-4214-0135-5.
- Clegern, Wayne M. (1994). Origins of liberal dictatorship in Central America: Guatemala, 1865-1873. University Press of Colorado. ISBN 978-0-87081-317-7.
- Wagner, Regina; Hempstead, William H.; Rothkirch, Cristóbal von; Stull, Eric (2001). The History of Coffee in Guatemala. Villegas Asociados. ISBN 978-958-8156-01-9.
